= Grand Italian Trail =

Long-distance trail in Italy

Sentiero Italia
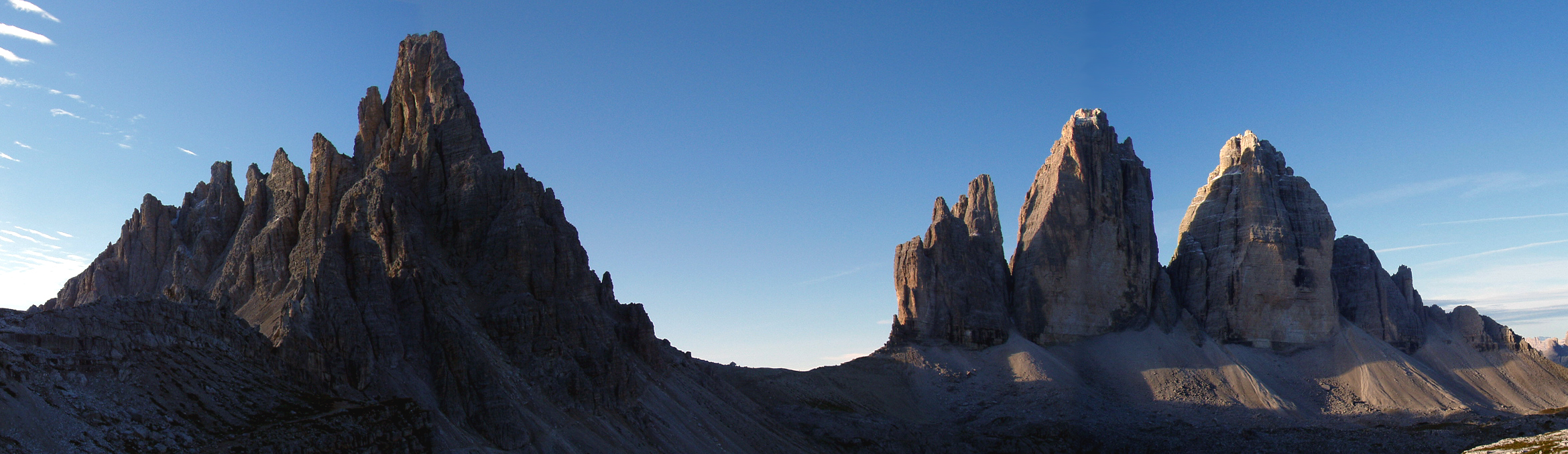
- Tre Cime di Lavaredo seen from the Antonio Locatelli Hut, a mountain hut on the Grand Italian Trail.
- Length: 3,832 mi (6,167 km)
- Location: Italy
- Designation: Club Alpino Italiano
- Trailheads: Santa Teresa Gallura; Muggia
- Use: Hiking
- Highest point: 3,098 m (10,164 ft)
- Lowest point: 0 ft (0 m)
- Months: Early April to late September
- Hazards: Severe weather Dehydration; Falling; Forest Fires; Landslides; Vipera; Hypothermia; Diarrhea from water

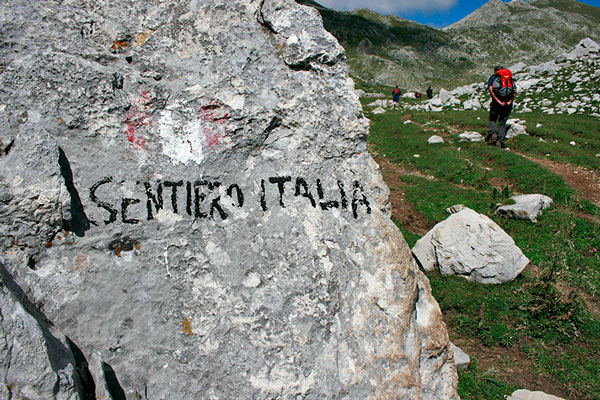

The Grand Italian Trail (Italian: Sentiero Italia) is a 6166-kilometer-long hiking trail that crosses the entire territory of Italy, passing through six UNESCO Heritage Sites, 15 national parks, and many other parks and nature reserves.

== Overview ==
The path, which is divided into 368 legs, begins in Trieste and then crosses the entire Alpine Arc, the entire Apennine mountain chain, Sicily and Sardinia before ending at Santa Teresa Gallura in Sardinia. The trail uses long sections of pre-existing trails including the Grand Alpine Trail (GTA: Grande Traversata delle Alpi), the Ligurian Mountain Trail (AVML: Alta Via dei Monti Liguri), and the Tuscan Grand Apennine Trail (GEA: Grande Escursione Appenninica).

== History ==
The original idea for this trail originated in 1983 within a group of ambitious hikers. With the help of the Italian Alpine Club, the trail became a reality in 1995 in the first ever CamminaItalia ("Walk Italy"), an event in which a group of trekkers departed from a Sardinian coastal village and covered the entire trail in eight months. The accomplishment was repeated in 1999; this time with the collaboration of the Italian National Alpine Association.

Since this time, the evolution of this project has slowed. While the trail blaze was chosen for the trail - a marking of red-white-red with "SI" written underneath in black - many legs of the trail remain un-marked and are only a part of the GIT on the map.

== Track ==
The official track is constantly verified and updated at the official site of the Grand Italian Trail. Each leg is described by a brief summary and completed with a GPS Track easy to download.

Besides the historic track, new variants are present, so hikers can adapt their journey and touch other parts of the country. For example, a different starting point of the GIT is set in the heart of Puglia and joins the classic route in the region of Molise. In central Italy a variant enters in the region of Lazio. Other variants can be found also in the northern part of the trail, where a separate path reaches Courmayeur in the region of Valle d'Aosta. However, the original track begins in northern Sardinia and ends in Friuli Venezia Giulia, at a memorial stone in Lazzaretto (near Trieste).

== Similar Treks ==
- Alta Via 1
- Alta Via 2
- Alta Via dei Monti Liguri
- Selvaggio Blu (Sardinia)
- Strada delle 52 Gallerie
- Caminito del Rey
- Tofana di Rozes
