= Cesta =

Cesta may refer to:

- Cesta, San Marino, a mountain peak overlooking the city
- Česta, a village near Aleksinac, Serbia
- Cesta, Ajdovščina, a settlement in the Vipava Valley, in the Littoral region of Slovenia
- Cesta, Dobrepolje, a village in the historical region of Lower Carniola in Slovenia
- Cesta, Kočevje, a former settlement in southern Slovenia
- Cesta, Krško, a settlement in the hills above the Sava River in eastern Slovenia
- Cesta, Trebnje, a small settlement west of Veliki Gaber in eastern Slovenia
- CEA Cesta or Centre d'études scientifiques et techniques d'Aquitaine
- Cesta (sports), equipment for the game of jai alai
- La Cesta (mountain), a mountain in Belluno, Italy
