= Strada delle 52 Gallerie =

WWI military mule road in Veneto, Italy

Road of 52 Tunnels, Road of the first Army
- Strada delle 52 gallerie, Strada della Prima Armata
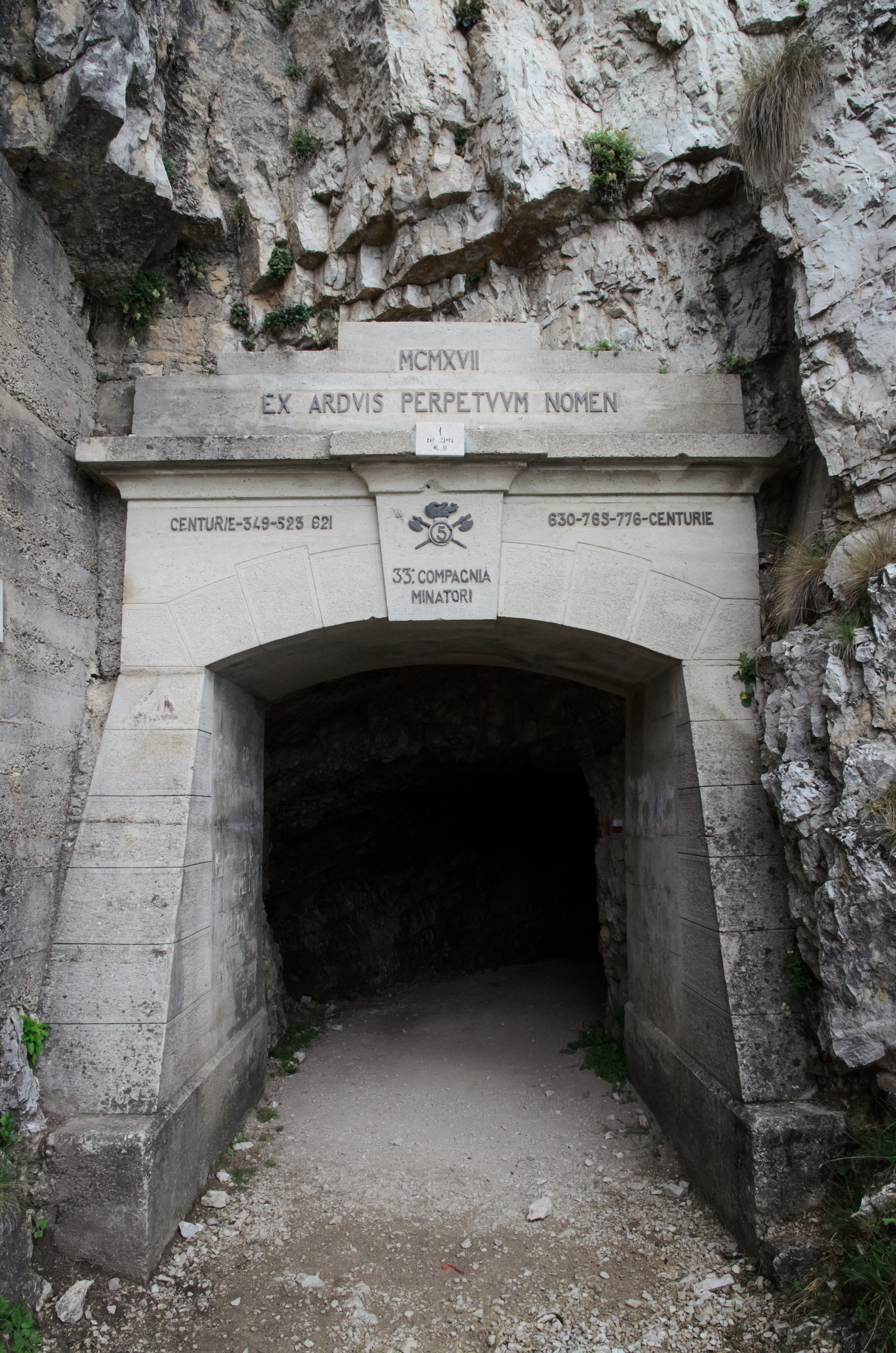
- Road of 52 Tunnels

Site information
- Type: military mule
- Controlled by: Kingdom of Italy
- Open to the public: yes

Location
- Location within Italy
- Coordinates: 45.779°N 11.228°E

Site history
- Built: February 6, 1917
- Built by: Kingdom of Italy
- In use: Kingdom of Italy
- Battles/wars: World War I

Strada delle 52 Gallerie
- Length: 6.5 km (4.0 mi)
- Trailheads: Bocchetta Campiglia (1.216 m); Porte del Pasubio (1.928 m)
- Use: Hiking
- Elevation change: 750 m (2,460 ft)
- Highest point: the end of 47th tunnel, 2,000 m (6,600 ft)
- Lowest point: Bocchetta Campiglia, 1,216 m (3,990 ft)
- Grade: 22 %
- Season: summer
- Surface: rock
- Right of way: military mule

The Strada delle 52 Gallerie ("Road of 52 tunnels"), also known as the 52 Tunnel Road, or Strada della Prima Armata ("Road of the First Army") is a military mule road built during World War I on the Pasubio massif in Veneto, Italy.

The road winds between Bocchetta Campiglia (1,216 metres [3,990 ft]) and the Porte del Pasubio (1,934 metres [6,345 ft]) crossing the southern slope of the mountain with its spires, deep canyons and sheer rock faces, outside of the range of Austro-Hungarian artillery.

== Features ==
It is 6,555 metres (21,506 ft) long, of which 2,335 metres (7,661 ft) are divided into 52 tunnels excavated from the rock, each tunnel is numbered and characterized by a particular name. The minimum width of 2.20 metres (7.2 ft) was originally intended to allow the transit of two mules with their baggage. The slope of the road reaches 22 percent, with an average of 12 percent. Notable among the many tunnels is the 19th because, in addition to being the longest (320 metres (1,050 ft)), it has a helical layout with 4 hairpin bends, inside a gigantic rock tower.

Tunnel 20 is carved out of a rock tower and to overcome the difference in height, it twists around itself like a corkscrew. Tunnels 41 through 45 run below the Passo Fontana d'oro (1,875 metres [6,152 ft]). On leaving the 47th tunnel the highest point of the road (2,000 metres [6,562 ft]), there is a panoramic view.

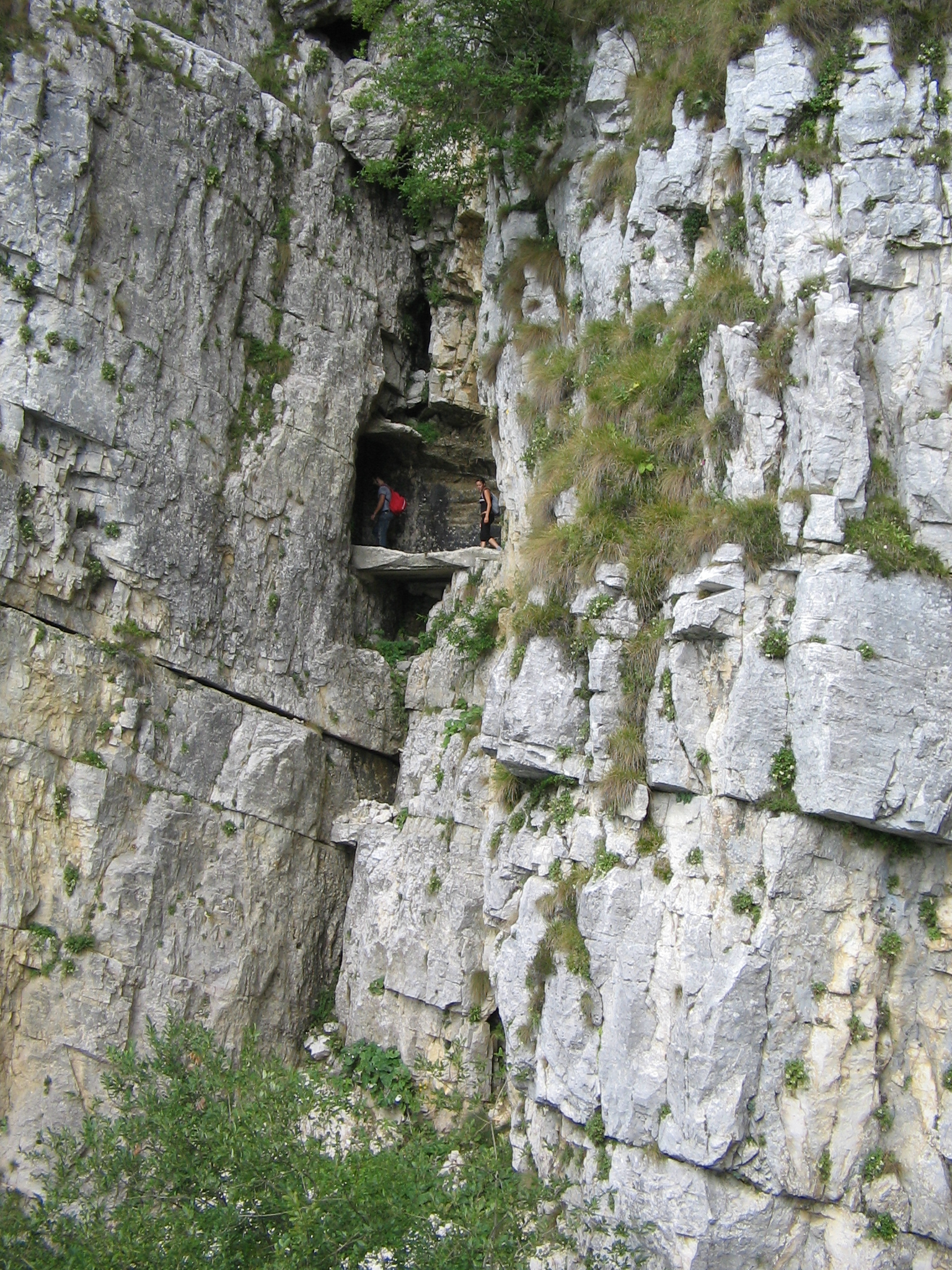
The passage of the 15th gallery

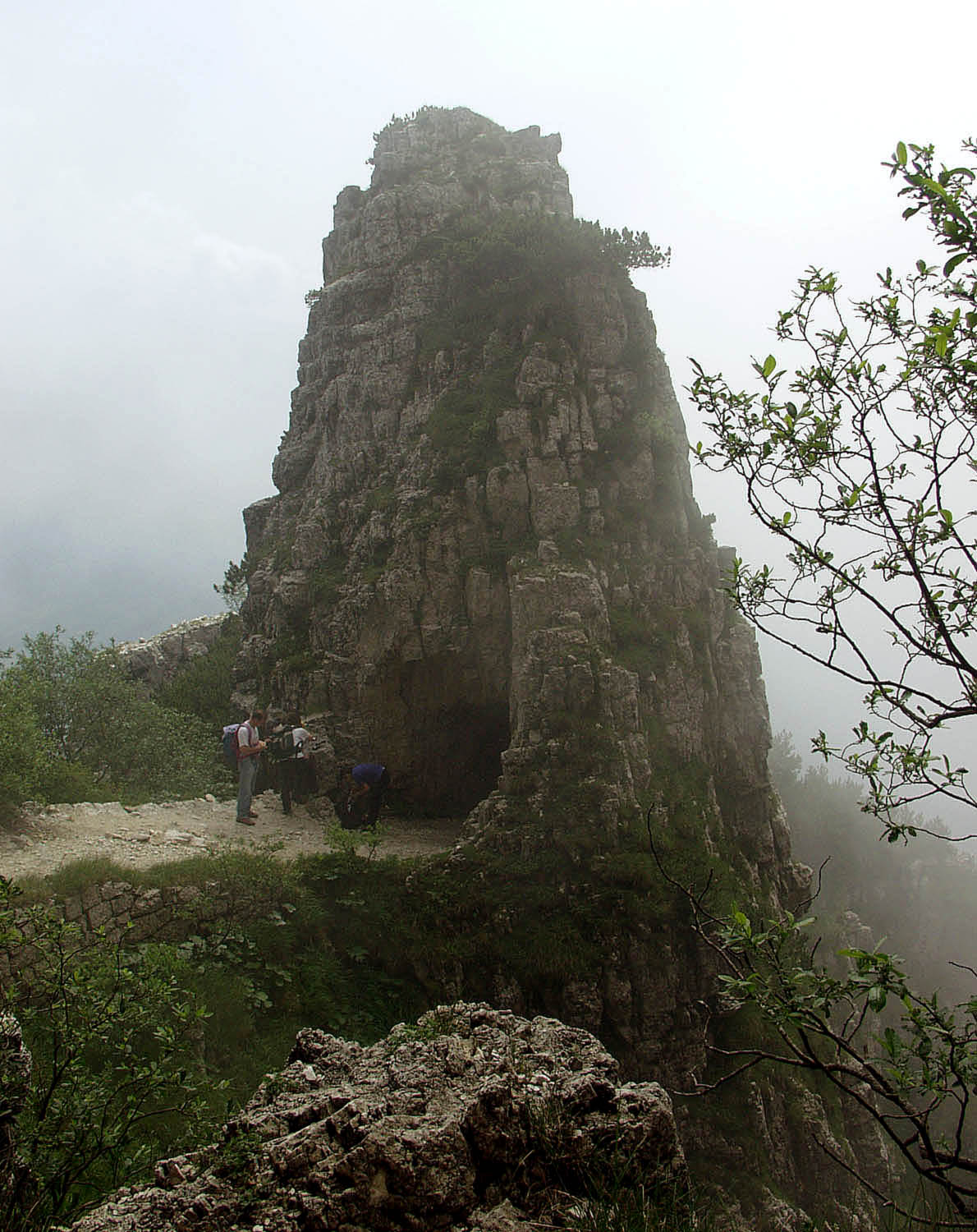
Top of the 20th tunnel (spiral tunnel)

== Completion ==
Produced by the 33rd Miners Company of the Italian Army with the help of six hundred workers, construction began on February 6, 1917, and was completed in November 1917.

Its implementation was of great strategic importance because it allowed communication and transfer of supplies from the base to the summit area of Mt. Pasubio. Key aspects of the road include year round access, located outside of enemy artillery range and accessible by mule. These were all problems with the similar road of Scarubbi which is only accessible with motorized vehicles, within the range of the Austro-Hungarian guns, and only during the summer.

Mountain biking is strictly prohibited due to a number of fatal accidents.

Order of tunnel	Name of tunnel	Length of tunnel	Picture
1	Cap. Zappa	17 metres	
2	Gen. D'Havet	65 metres	
3	Rovereto	14 metres	
4	Battisti	31 metres	
5	Oberdan	10 metres	
6	Trieste	17 metres	
7	Gen. Cascino	35 metres	
8	Gen. Cantore	23 metres	
9	Gen. Zoppi	78 metres	
10	Sauro	12 metres	
11	Magg. Randaccio	28 metres	
12	Cap. Motti	95 metres	
13	Cap. Filzi	27 metres	
14	Cap. Melchiori	61 metres	
15	Tortona	45 metres	
16	Reggio Calabria	74 metres	
17	Bergamo	52 metres	
18	Parma	46 metres	
19	Re (Victor Emmanuel III of Italy)	318 metres	
20	Gen. Cadorna	86 metres	
21	Gen. Porro	20 metres	
22	Breganze	8 metres	
23	Gen. Capello	18 metres	

Order of tunnel	Name of tunnel	Length of tunnel	Picture
24	Bologna	16 metres	
25	Aquila	11 metres	
26	Napoli	24 metres	
27	Cap. Picone	98 metres	
28	Genoa	14 metres	
29	Spezia	31 metres	
30	Miss	10 metres	
31	Gen. Papa	72 metres	
32	Palazzolo	48 metres	
33	33ª minatori	57 metres	
34	Gen. Giustetti	132 metres	
35	Trani	10 metres	
36	Gen. Garibaldi	12 metres	
37	Balilla	26 metres	
38	Turin	29 metres	
39	Mantua	53 metres	
40	Trento	10 metres	
41	26ª minatori	24 metres	
42	Macerata	19 metres	
43	Polesine	55 metres	
44	Zappatori Liguria	22 metres	
45	Plotone 25ª minatori	83 metres	
46	Piceno	65 metres	
47	Pallanza	22 metres	
48	Cesena	14 metres	
49	Soldato italiano	19 metres	
50	Cav. Vittorio Veneto	27 metres	
51	Plotone minatori sardo	66 metres	
52	Sardinia	86 metres	

== Similar Treks ==
- Alta Via 1
- Alta Via 2
- Alta Via dei Monti Liguri
- Grand Italian Trail
- Selvaggio Blu (Sardinia)
- Caminito del Rey
- Tofana di Rozes
