= Alta Via 3 =

High altitude footpath, Dolomites

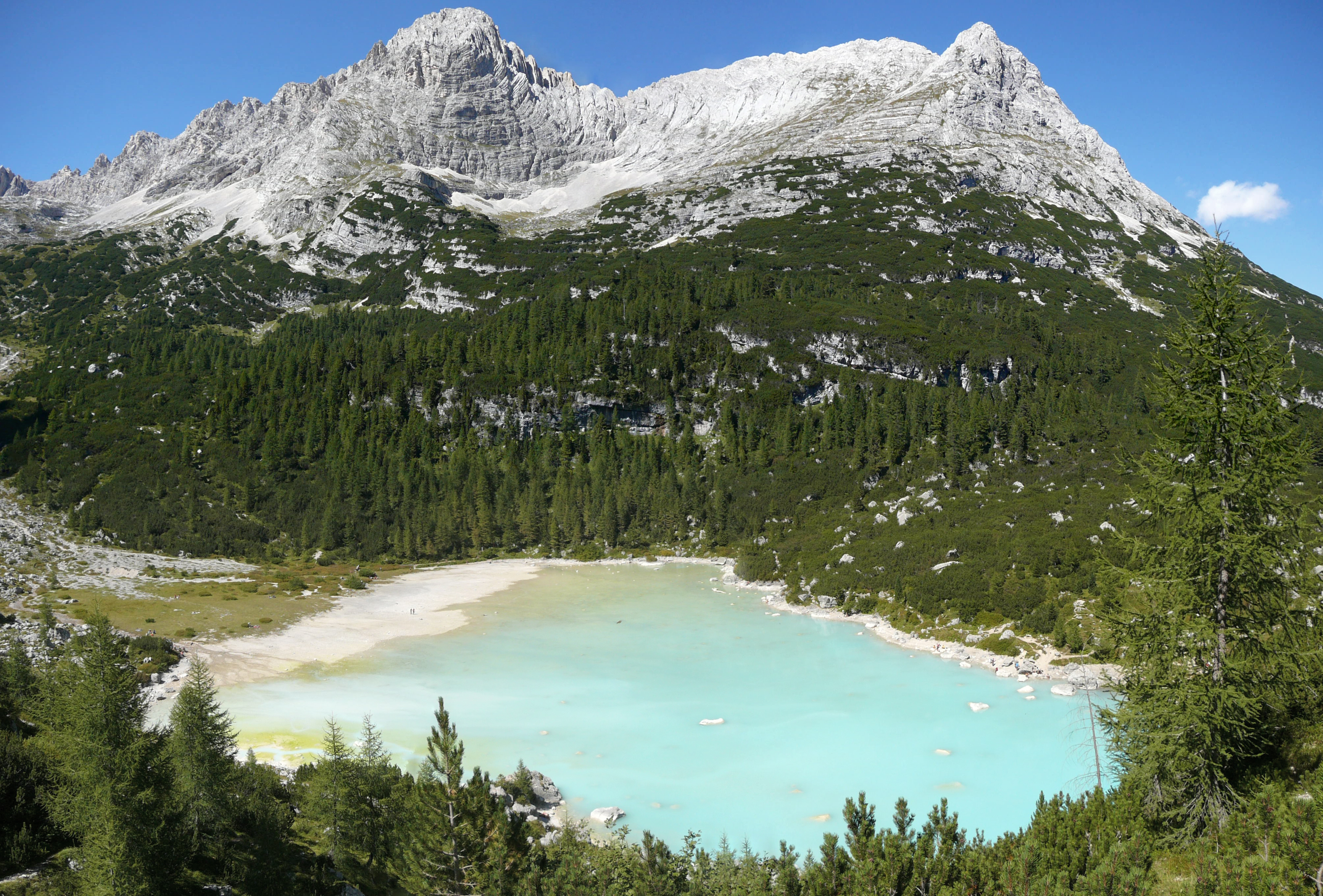
- Lago di Sorapiss
- Length: 100 kilometres (60 mi) approximately
- Location: Dolomites, Italy
- Trailheads: Niederdorf / Villabassa
- Use: Hiking
- Elevation gain/loss: approximately 6,200 m (20,341 ft) gain 6,800 m (22,310 ft) loss
- Highest point: Forcella Ciadìn del Lòudo, 2,378 m (7,802 ft)
- Difficulty: Moderate to challenging
- Season: Summer to early autumn
- Months: Late June to mid September

Alta Via 3 is a high route located in the Italian Dolomites between Niederdorf in the north and Longarone in the south.

The route is nicknamed "The Route of Chamois"

The Alta Via 3 is a physically demanding trail. It is approximately 100 km long, with an elevation gain of approximately 6,200 meters. Some sections of the route are exposed or steep. Few sections are equipped with steel cable.

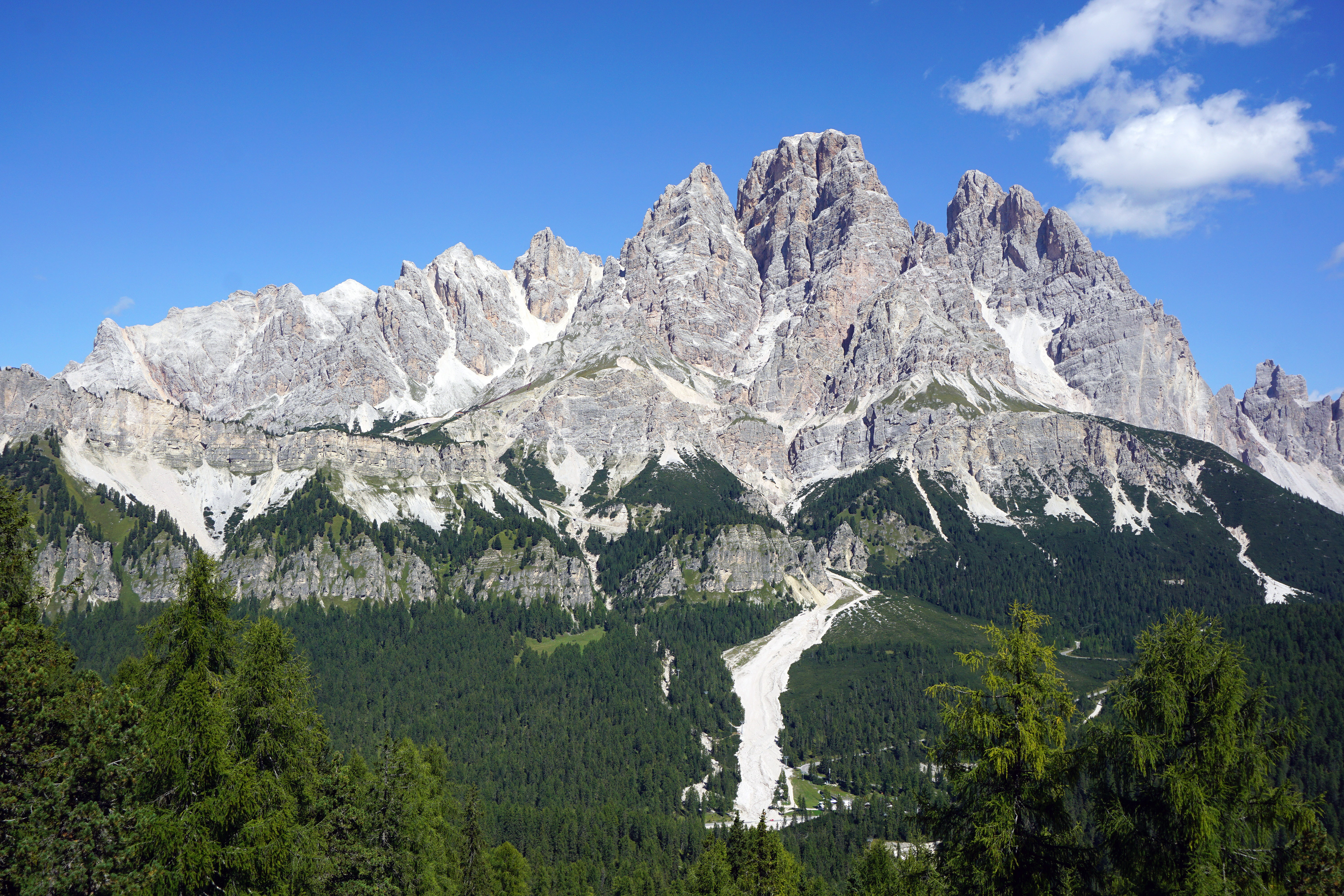
Cristallo

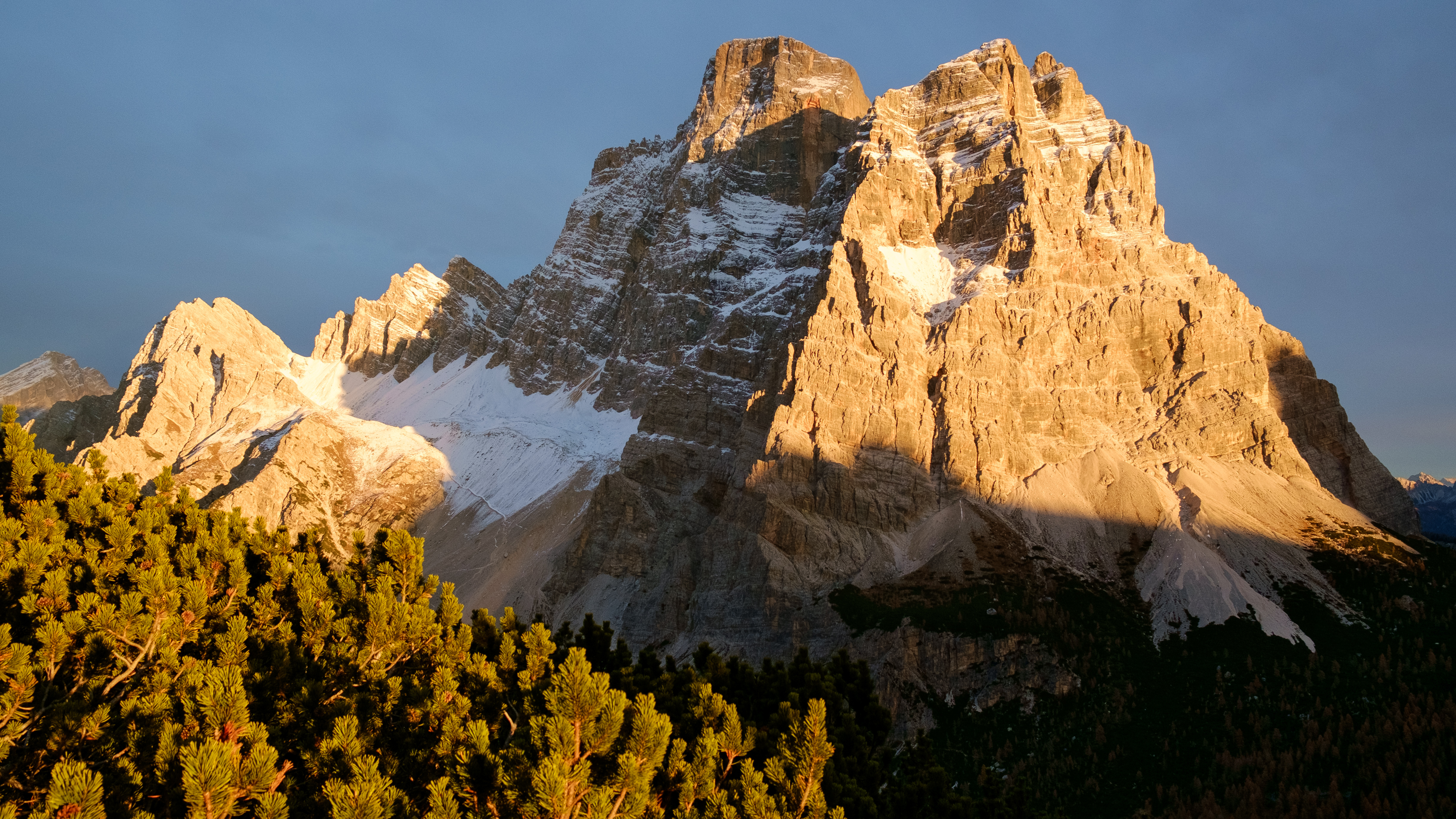
Monte Pelmo

The trail is well marked with red and white paint splashes, cairns, and occasional dark red triangular symbols containing the number '3'.

The entire journey usually takes 8 days. Most hikers walk the trail from north to south, which is the way the route is described in the most guidebooks.

The hike starts in Niederdorf, goes through Monta Piana, where are numerous remnants from fights of First World War. From Monte Piana the hike continues around Monte Cristallo, then to Lake Sorapiss and across the Sorapiss mountain range. After that it nearly touches Antelao mountain and continues through San Vito di Cadore toward Monte Pelmo. From Monte Pelmo the hike continues to Longarone which is the terminus. Part of the hike is common with similar trails Alta Via 4 and Alta Via 5.

== Accommodation ==
Alta Via 3 is a hut to hut trail, so that each section ends with a hut (rifugio), that offers food and accommodation.

== Maps ==
- Trail on Openstreetmap
- Trail on Waymarked Trails

== See also ==
- Dolomites
- Via Ferrata
- Alta Via 1
- Alta Via 2
- Alta Via 4
