= Alta Via 4 =

High altitude footpath, Dolomites

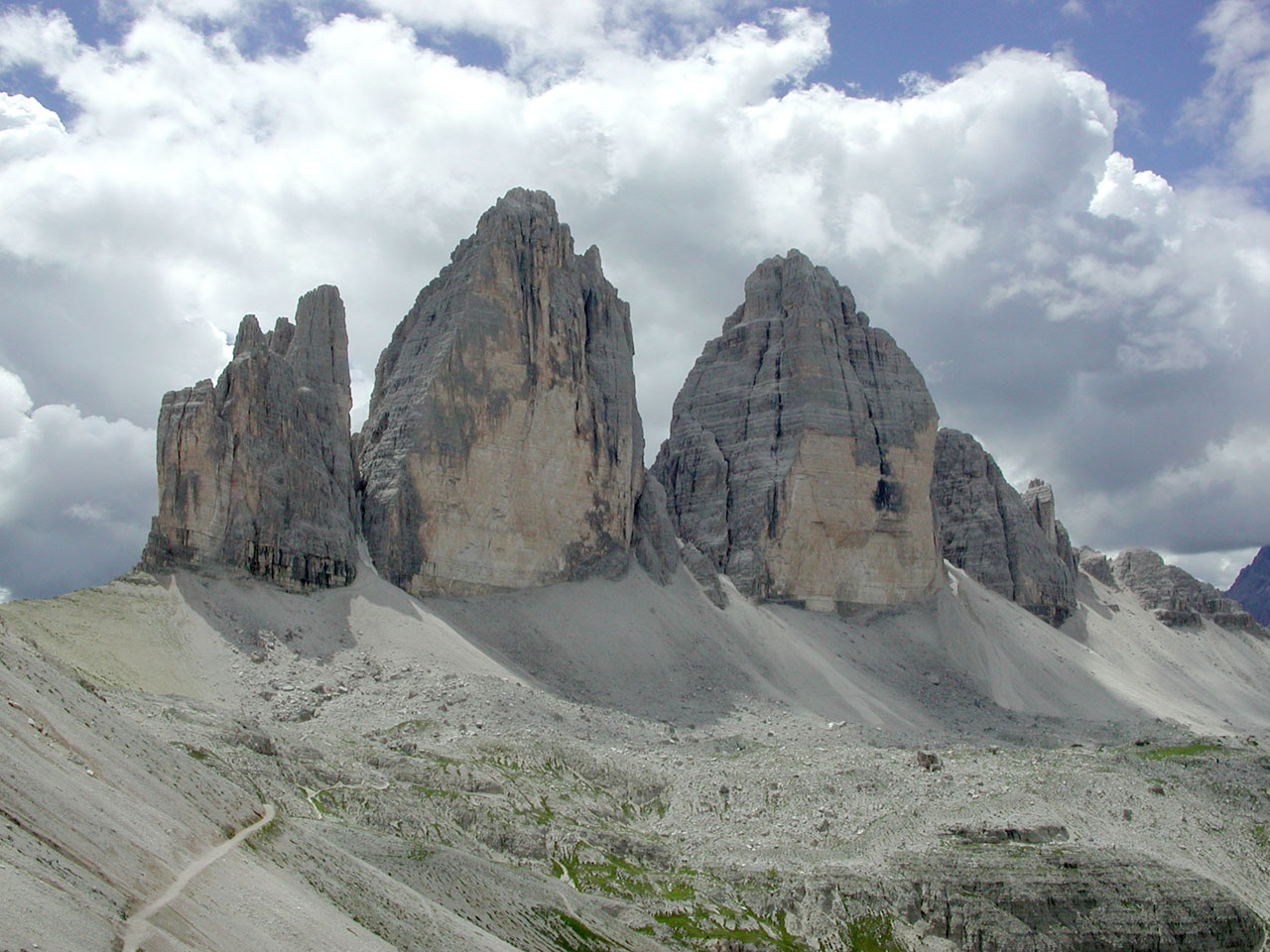
- Tre Cime
- Length: 85 kilometres (50 mi) approximately
- Location: Dolomites, Italy
- Trailheads: Innichen / San Candido in Pusterìa
- Use: Hiking
- Elevation gain/loss: approximately 4,500 m (14,764 ft) gain 4,500 m (14,764 ft) loss
- Highest point: Forcella del Ghiacciaio, 2,584 m (8,478 ft)
- Difficulty: Moderate to challenging
- Season: Summer to early autumn
- Months: Late June to mid September

Alta Via 4 is a high route located in the Italian Dolomites between Innichen in the north and Pieve di Cadore in the south.

The Alta Via 4 is a physically demanding trail. It is approximately 85 km long, with an elevation gain of approximately 4,500 meters. Some sections of the route are exposed or steep. Few sections are equipped with steel cable.

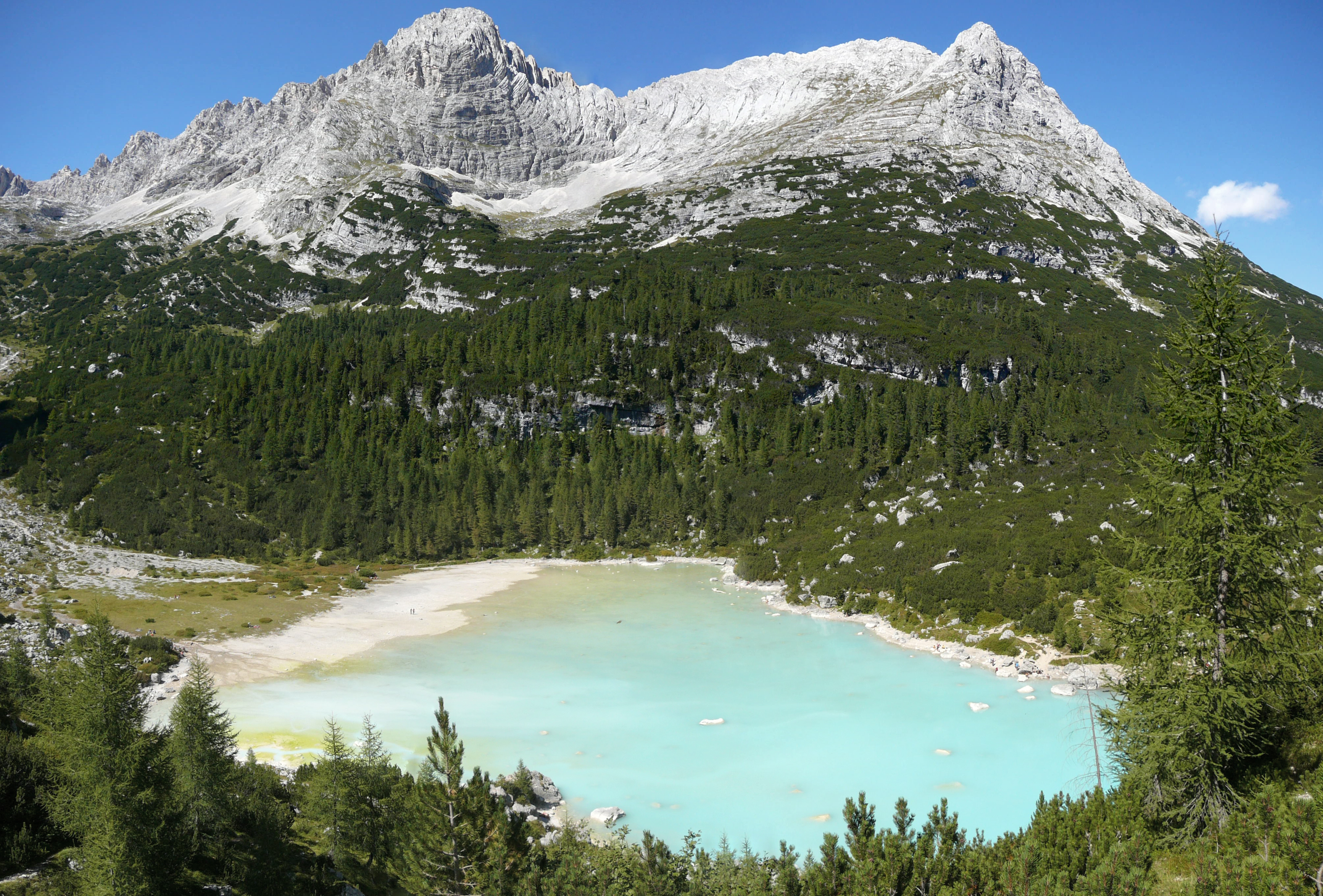
Lake Sorapiss

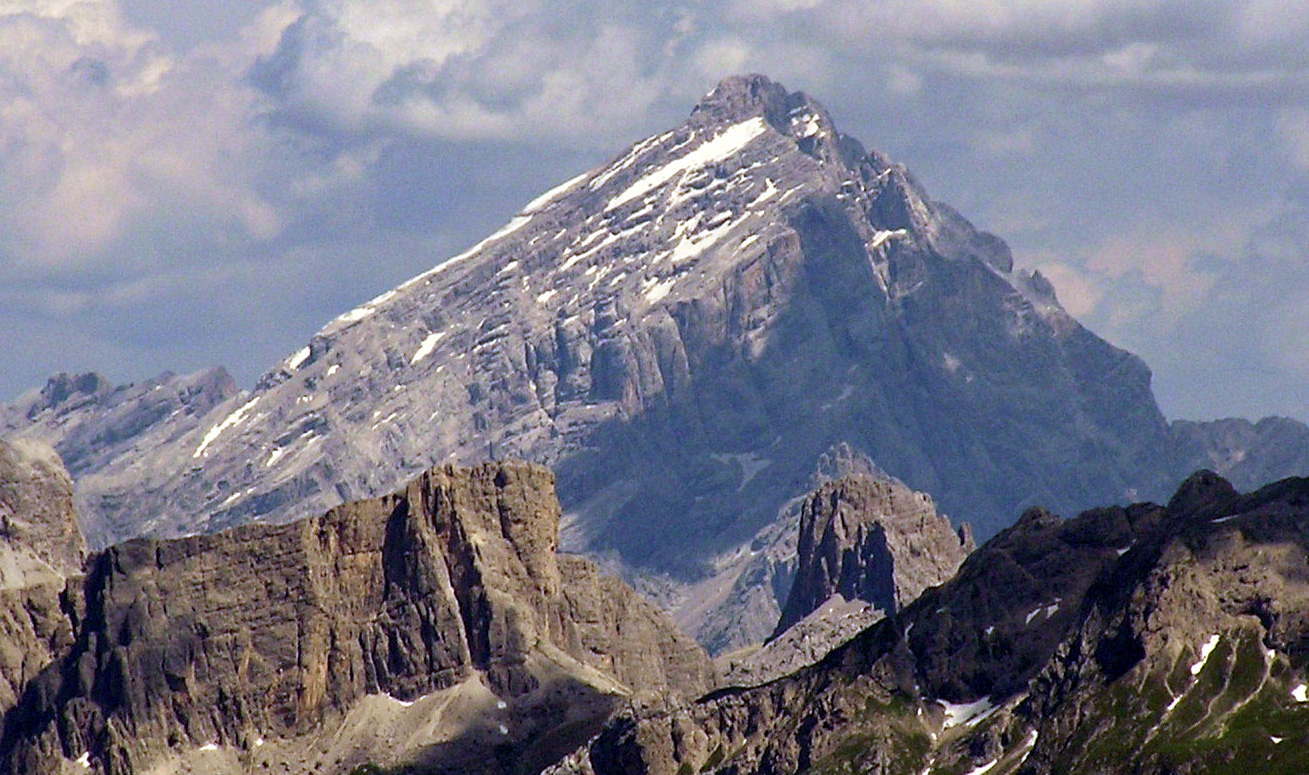
Antelao

The trail is well marked with red and white paint splashes, cairns, and occasional dark blue triangular symbols containing the number '4'.

The entire journey usually takes 6 days. Most hikers walk the trail from north to south, which is the way the route is described in the most guidebooks.

The hike goes around Tre Cime di Lavaredo, which are probably one of the best-known mountain groups in the Dolomites. Then it continues around high altitude Lake Sorapiss, and finally goes through mountain ridge Antelao. Part of the hike is common with similar trails Alta Via 3 and Alta Via 5.

== Accommodation ==
Alta Via 4 is a hut to hut trail, so that each section ends with a hut (rifugio), that offers food and accommodation.

== Maps ==
- Trail on Openstreetmap
- Trail on Waymarked Trails

== See also ==
- Dolomites
- Via Ferrata
- Alta Via 1
- Alta Via 2
- Alta Via 3
