= Lake Sorapiss =

Lake in the Dolomites, Northern Italy

Coordinates: 46°31′14″N 12°13′24″E

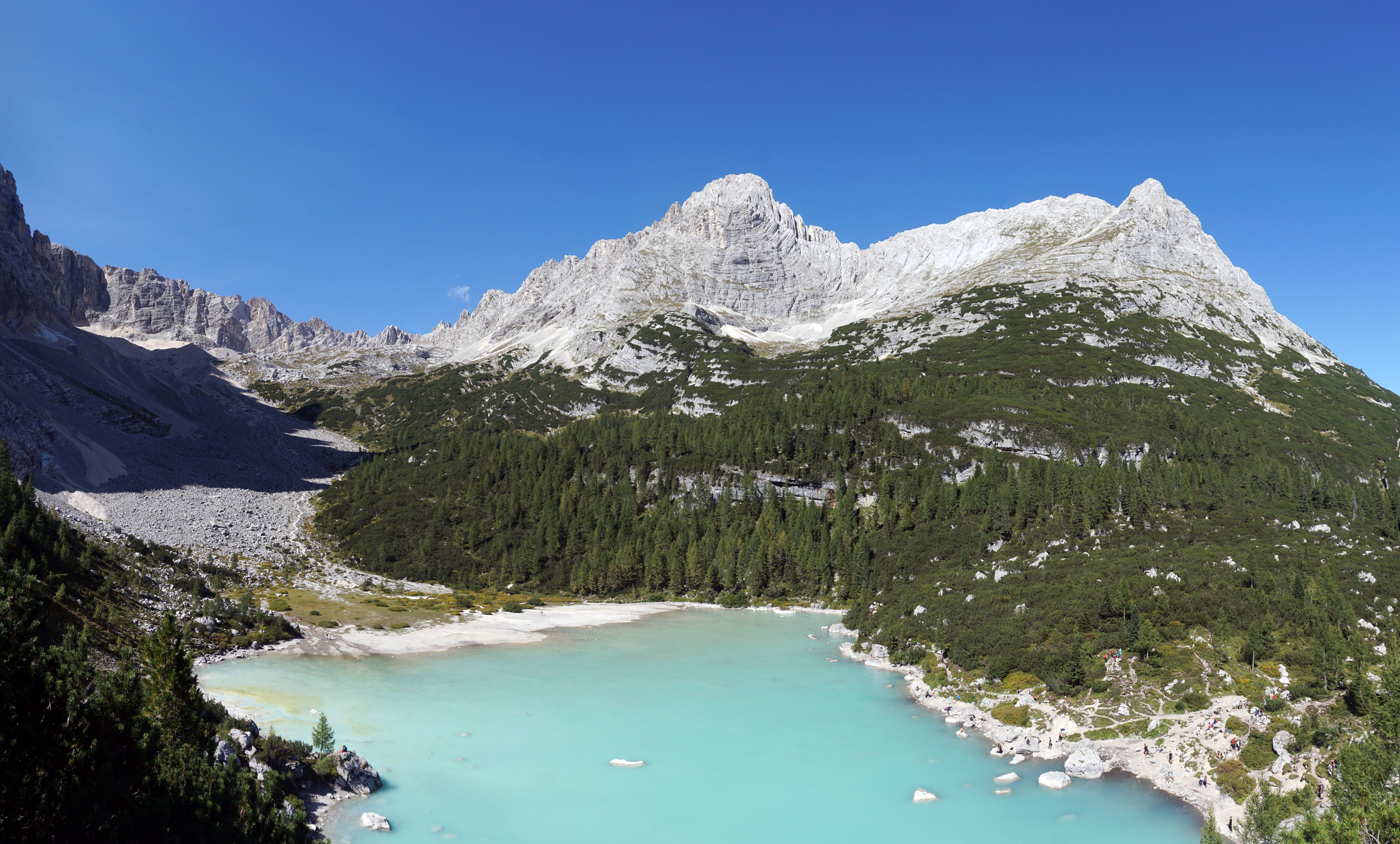
Lake Sorapiss during summer (La Cesta on skyline)

Lago di Sorapiss (Italian: Lago di Sorapis; German: Sorapissee), also written as Sorapis, is a lake in the mountain range Sorapiss in the Dolomites, province of Belluno, c. 12 km away from Cortina d'Ampezzo. The lake has an altitude of 1,925 metres (6,316 ft.) above sea level.

The strong turquoise color is dust from the glacier. The lake can only be reached by foot or by helicopter. The hiking trail has a length of 10.5 km and takes 1.5 hours one way starting from Passo tre Croci. Also the hikes Alta Via 3 and Alta Via 4 lead around Lake Sorapis.

== The Color ==
Lake Sorapis gets its turquoise color from Dolomite rock powder that is brought down from the nearby Sorapis glacier. As the glacier melts, its meltwater feeds the lake with ground down dolomite. The color of the water changes depending on how deep the lake is - in late spring and summer, it's the deepest, thus more blue than green.

In August, it happens that Lago di Sorapis has barely any water. In the colder months - fall to late spring - the lake is covered by snow.

== Hiking to Lake Sorapis ==
The hike to lake Sorapis is rated medium to hard. The overall distance is approximately 5 kilometres one way and the trail is quite varied. While the overall elevation gain is only about 130 metres, the total ascent and descent on this hike approximately 430 metres.

At parts, the trail is very narrow. There are also stretches with metallic ladders and some parts of it have steel cables for protection. Occasionally, some rock climbing is necessary, but no special equipment is needed.

The hike itself starts and ends at Passo Tre Croci (elevation 1800 msl). The pass is easily reachable from Cortina by a car or a bus.

== Gallery ==
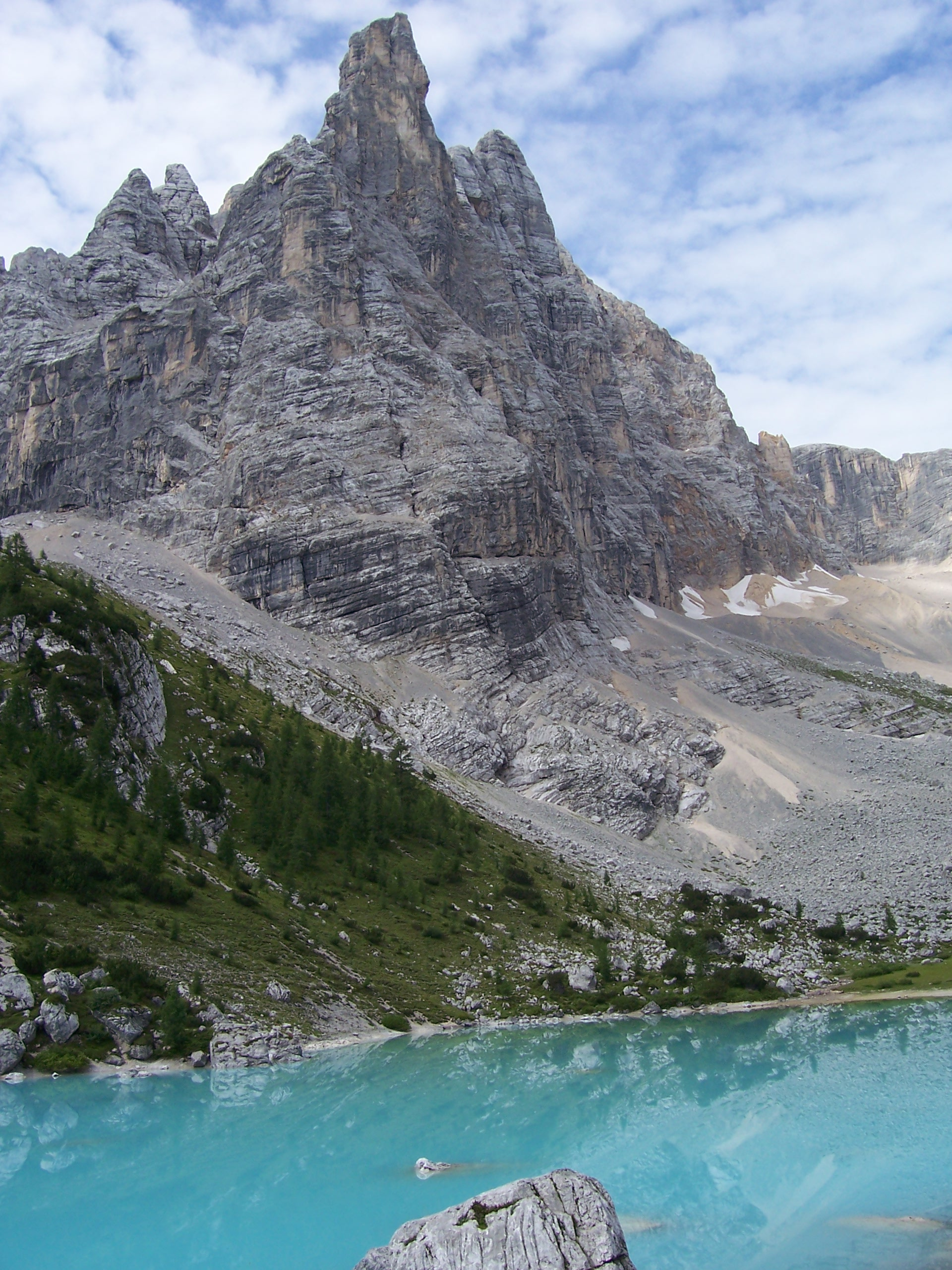

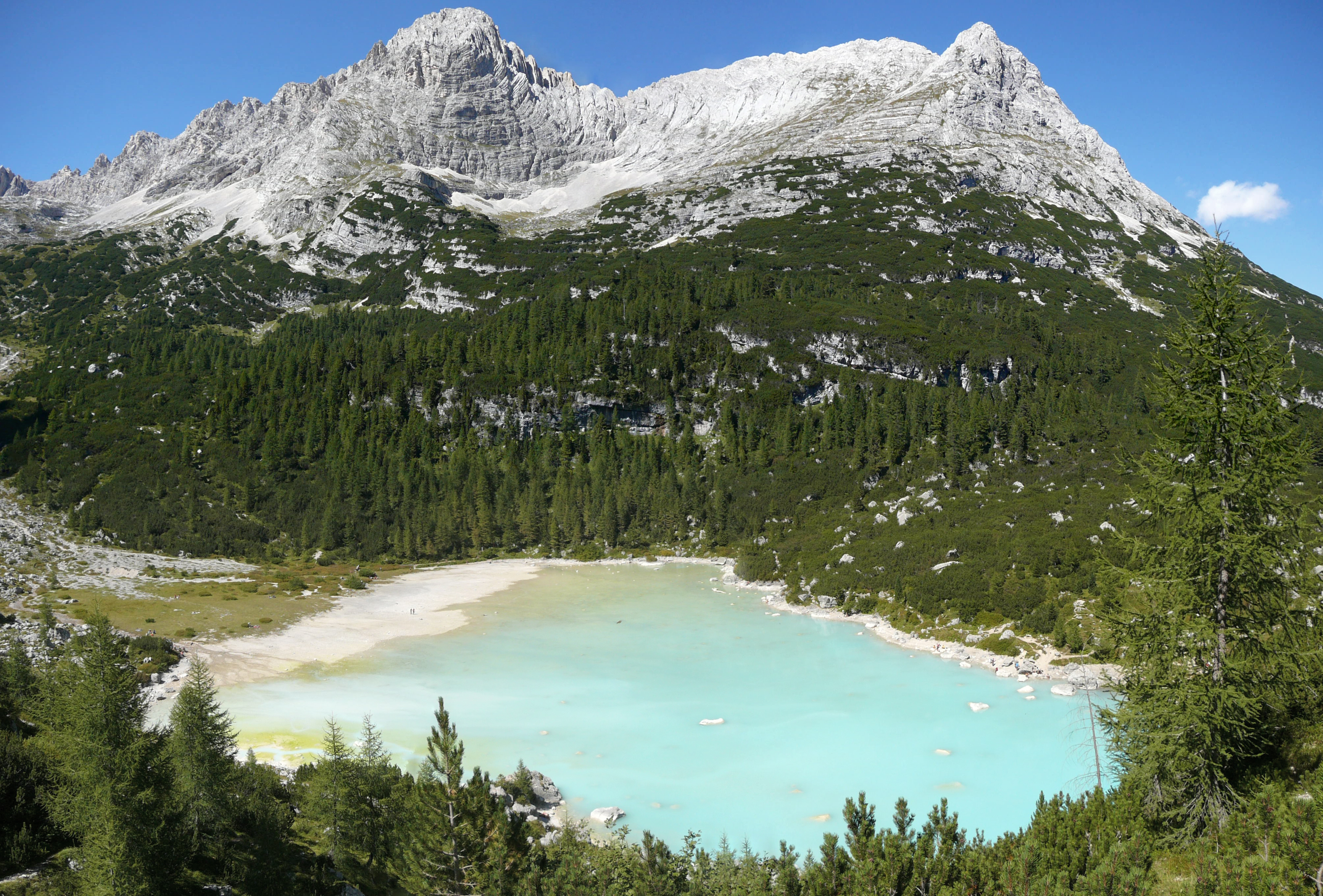

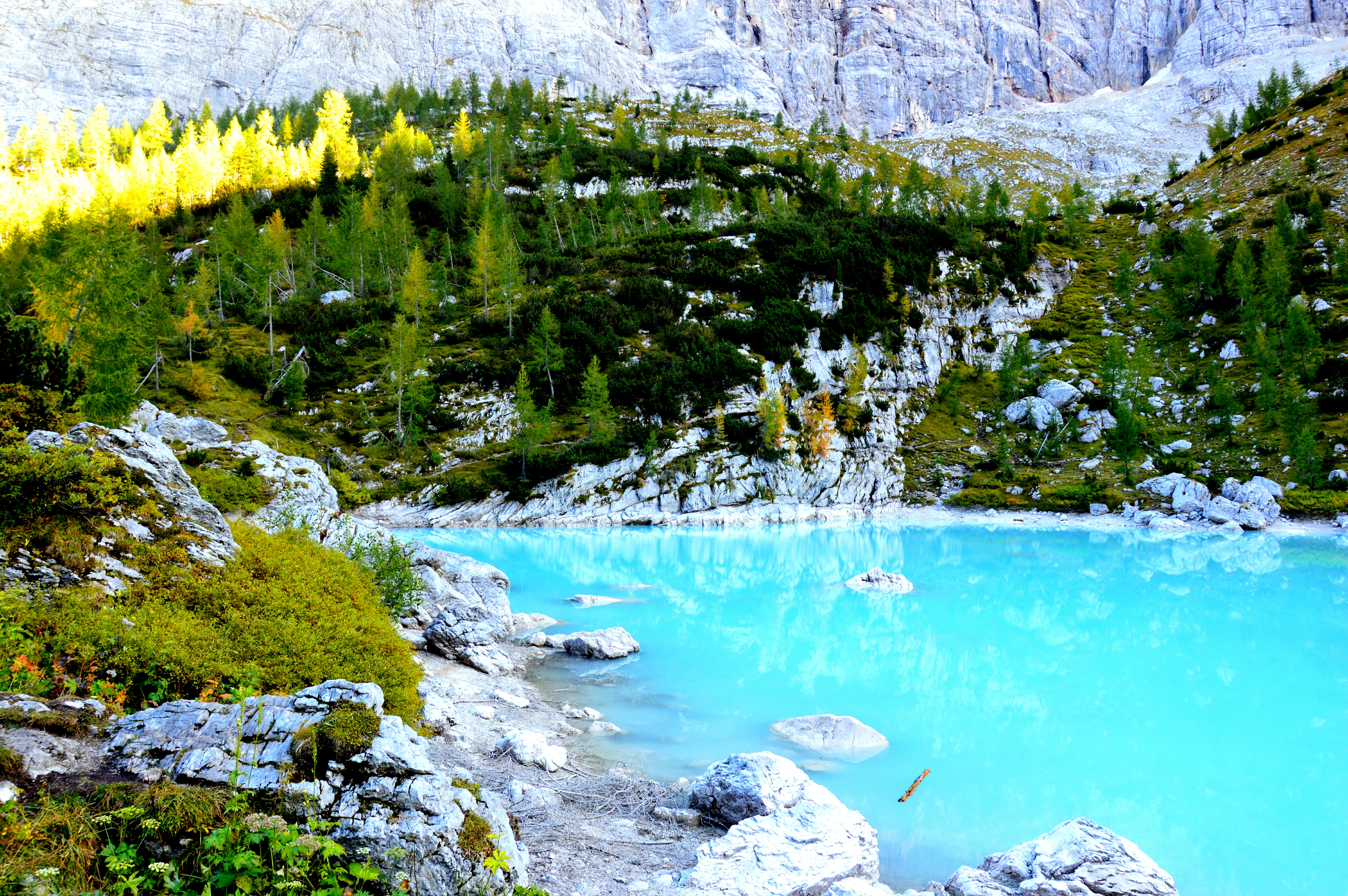

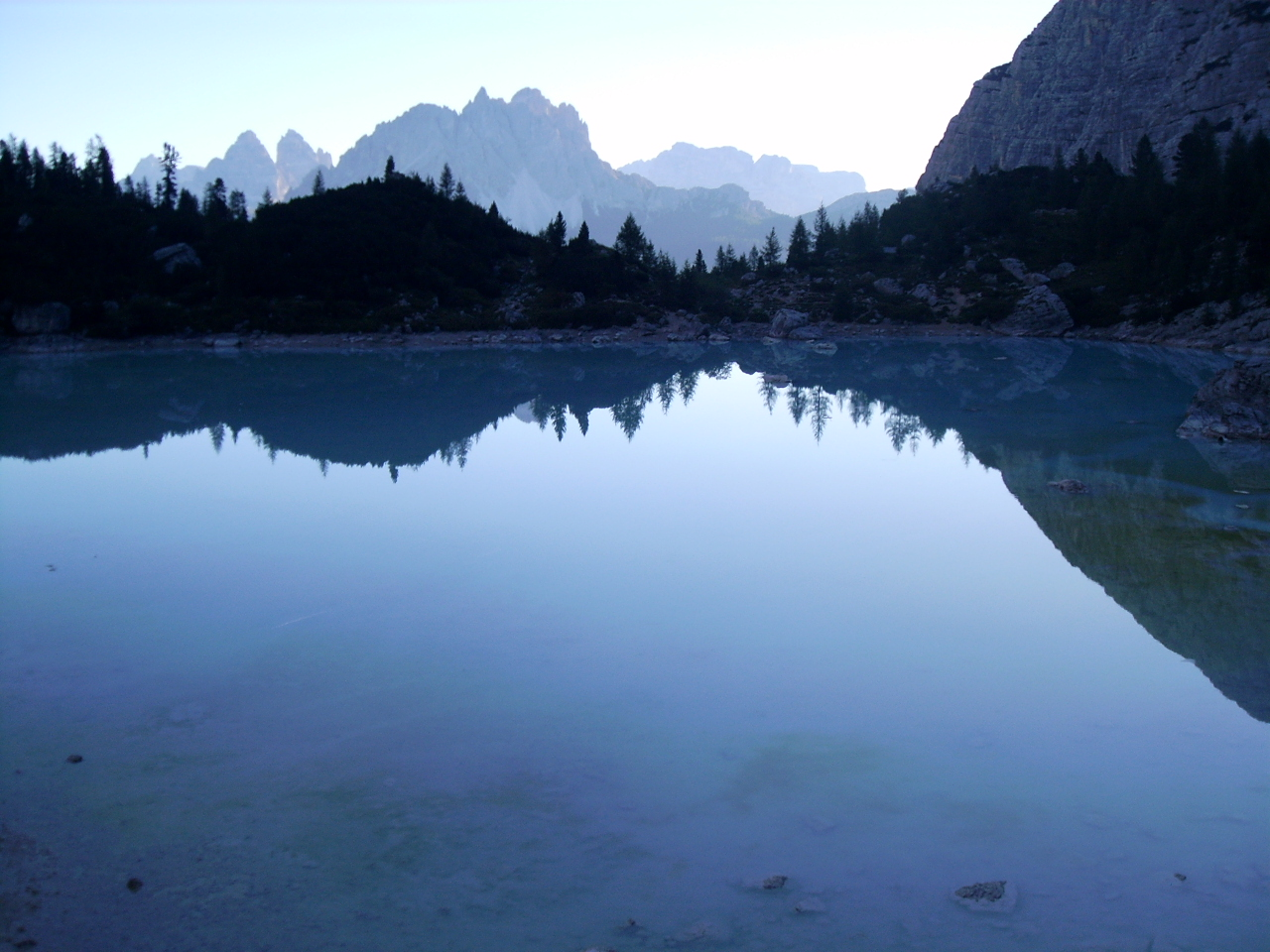

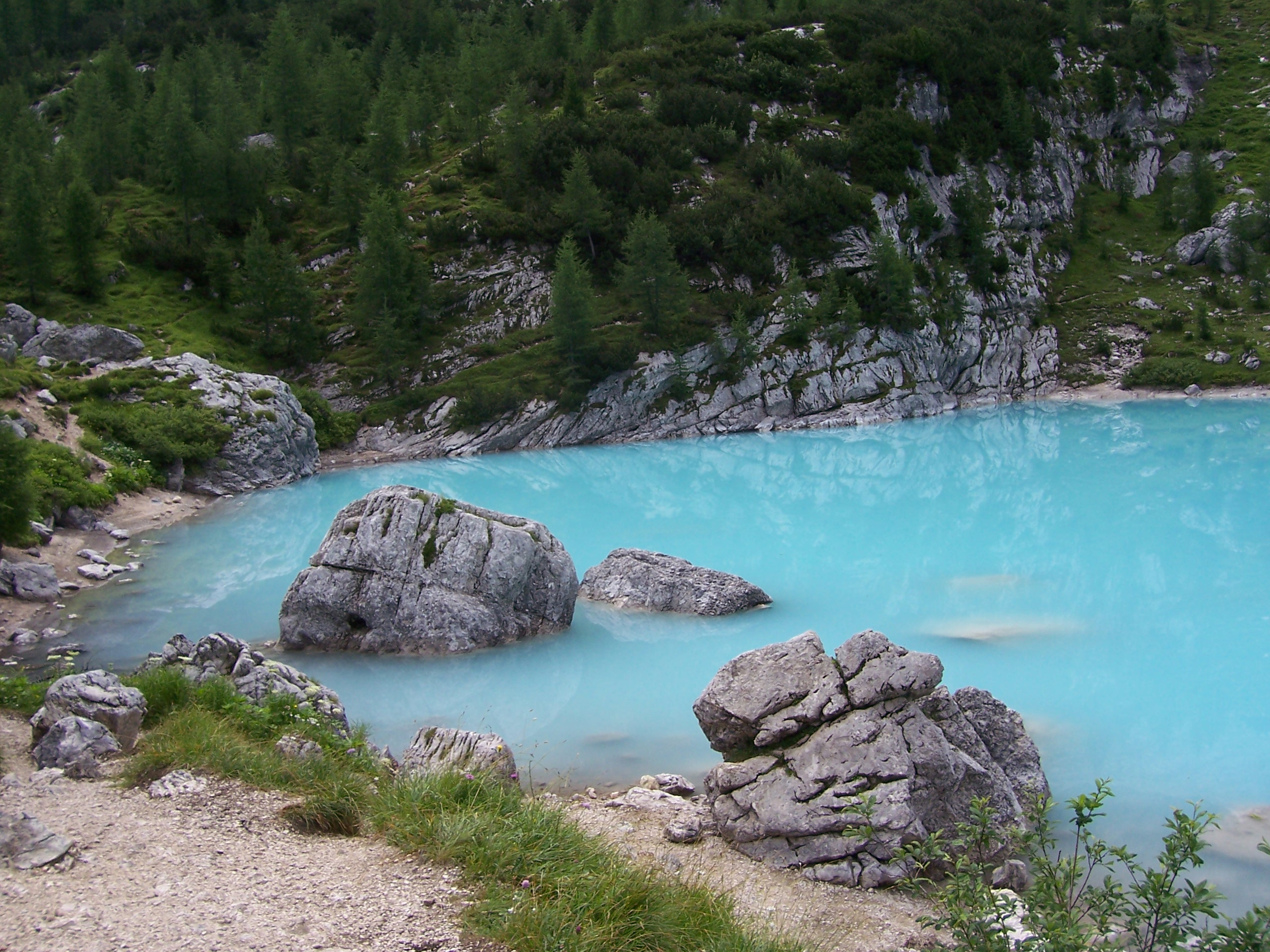

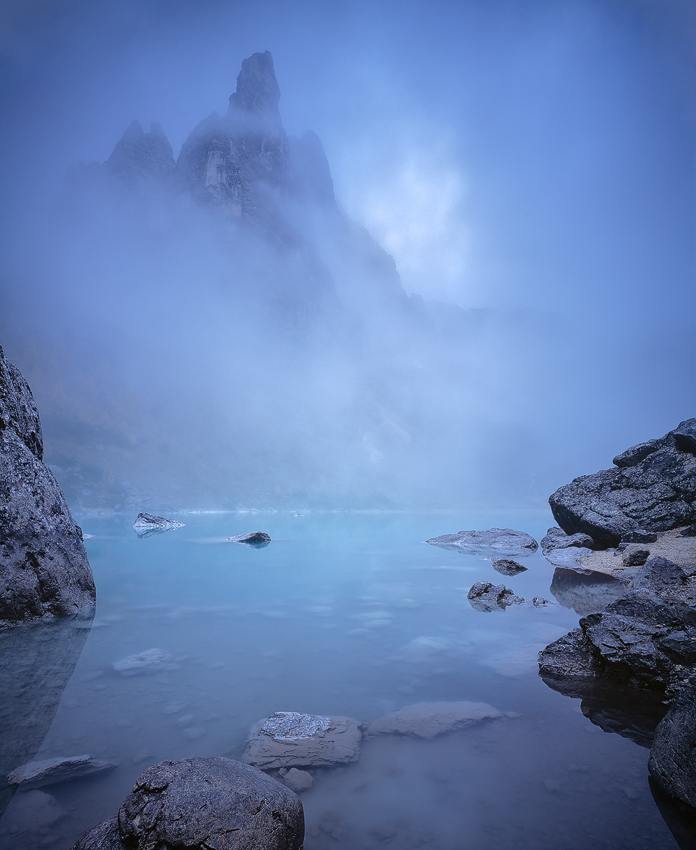

== See also ==
- List of lakes in Italy § Alphabetical
