= Antelao =

Mountain in Italy

- King of the Dolomites
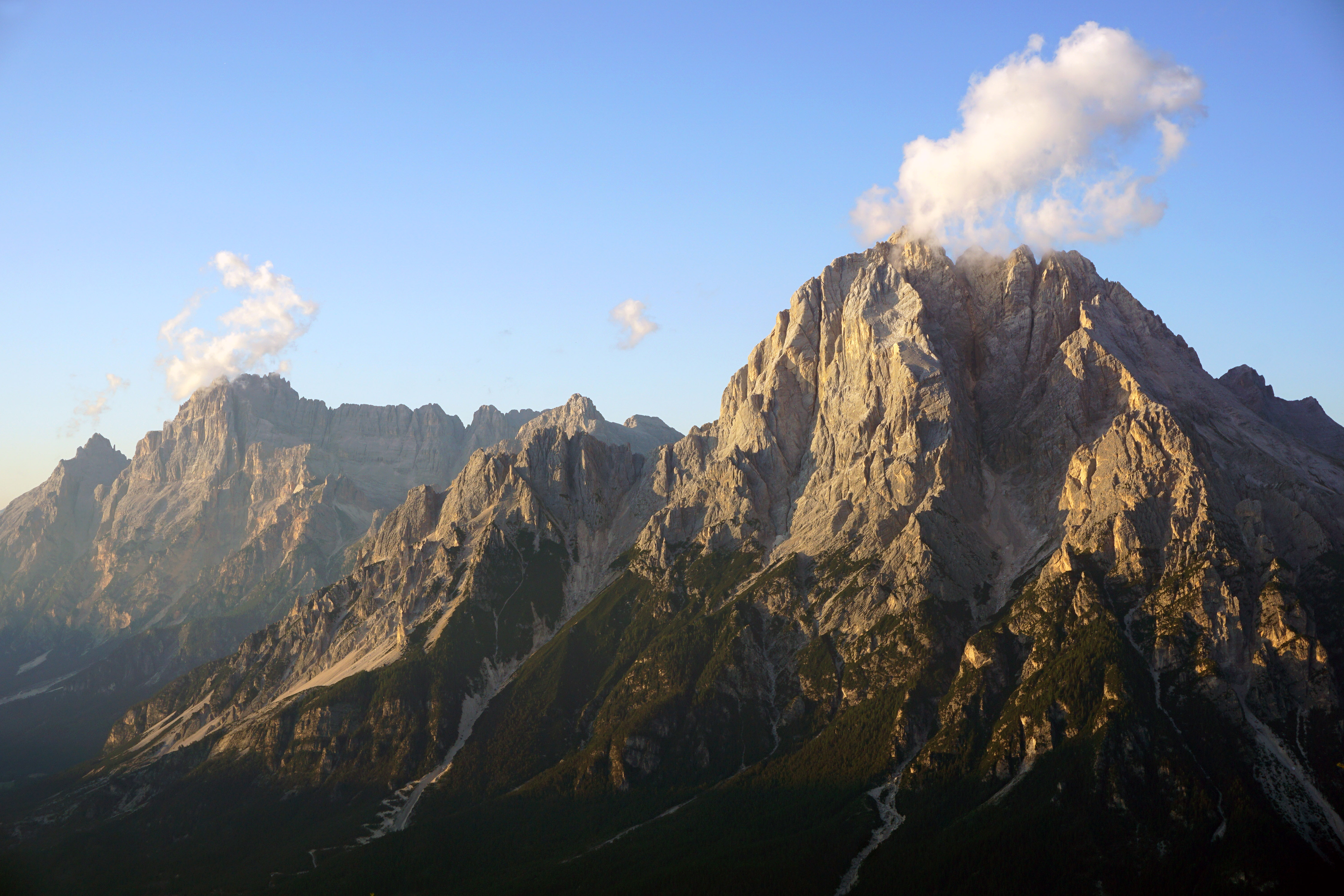
- Monte Antelao from Monte Rite.

Highest point
- Elevation: 3,263 m (10,705 ft)
- Prominence: 1,734 m (5,689 ft)
- Isolation: 31.3 km (19.4 mi)
- Listing: Ultra, Alpine mountains above 3000 m
- Coordinates: 46°27′9″N 12°15′38″E

Geography
- Location within Italy
- Location: Province of Belluno, Italy
- Parent range: Dolomites

Climbing
- First ascent: 18 September 1863 by Paul Grohmann, F. Lacedelli, A. Lacedelli, and Matteo Ossi or perhaps already around 1860 by Matteo Ossi
- Easiest route: Exposed scramble, class 4

Monte Antelao (Cadorino dialect: Nantelòu) is the highest mountain in the eastern Dolomites (a section of the Alps) in northeastern Italy, southeast of the town of Cortina d'Ampezzo, in the region of Cadore. The Monte Antelao is an ultra-prominent peak (Ultra).

It is known as the "King of the Dolomites" (Marmolada, the highest of all the Dolomites, is the "Queen" although composed mostly of limestones). As the highest pinnacle of the eastern Dolomites, the Antelao is not part of a closed massif or a high plateau, but a single, mighty rock pyramid. Like many Dolomite peaks, Antelao is steep, rocky, and pointed; it also sits close to the edge of the Dolomite uplift and so has dramatic drops to the nearby valleys. When the weather is good, Monte Antelao is clearly visible from Trieste on the Adriatic Sea.

The summit was reached for the first time in 1850 by the hunter Matteo Ossi from San Vito, who then accompanied the mountaineer Paul Grohmann to the summit in 1863. The modern Alta Via 4 trail which goes through Antelao has a nickname Alta Via di Grohmann.

The easiest route is from the north, known as the "Laste", a steep, narrow ridge. It involves a good deal of exposure, and a few short technical sections, such as a chimney, protected by cables. There is a refuge, the Rifugio Galassi, which is located below the Forcella Piccola in the upper Val d'Oten.

== Gallery ==
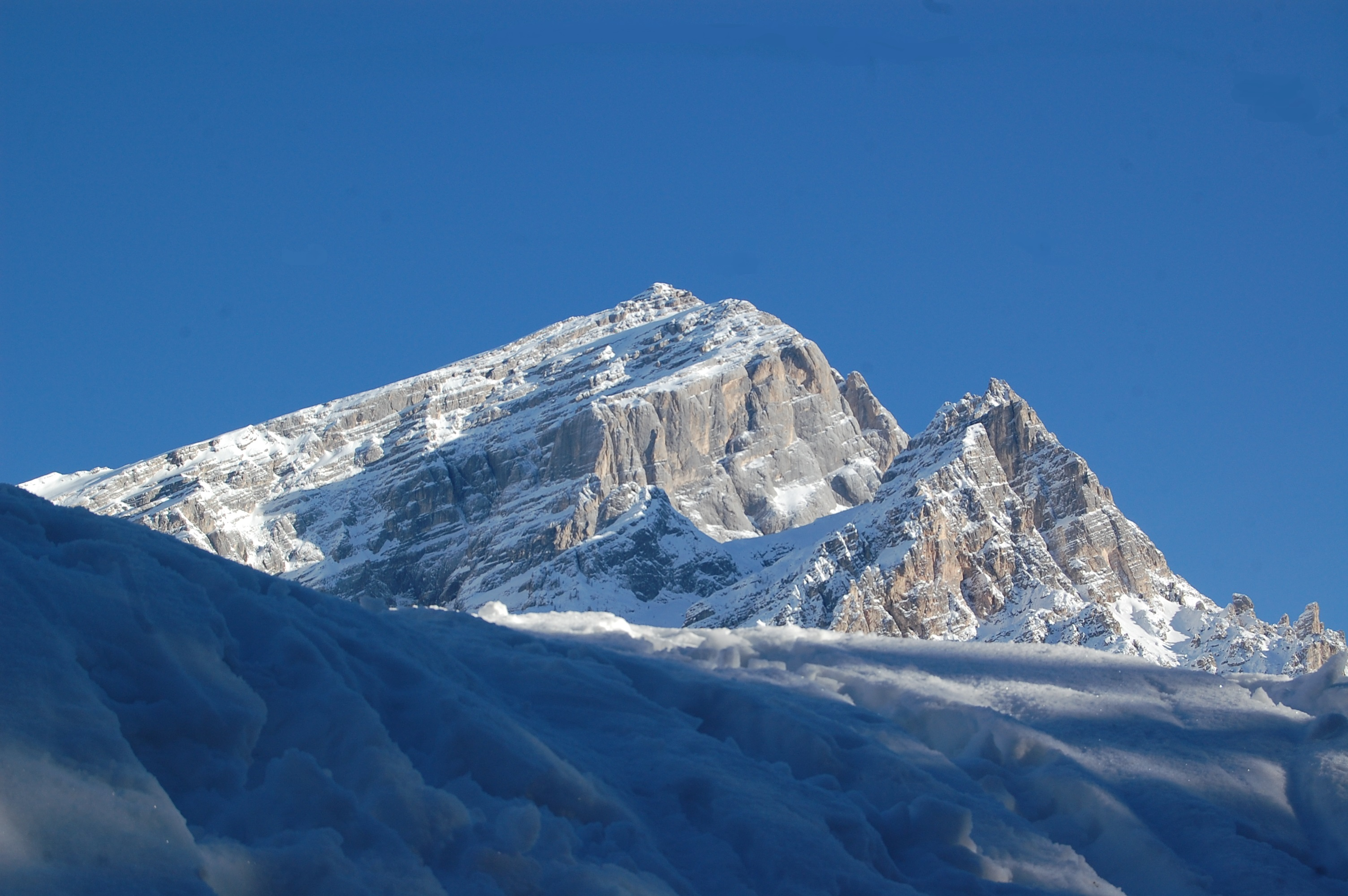

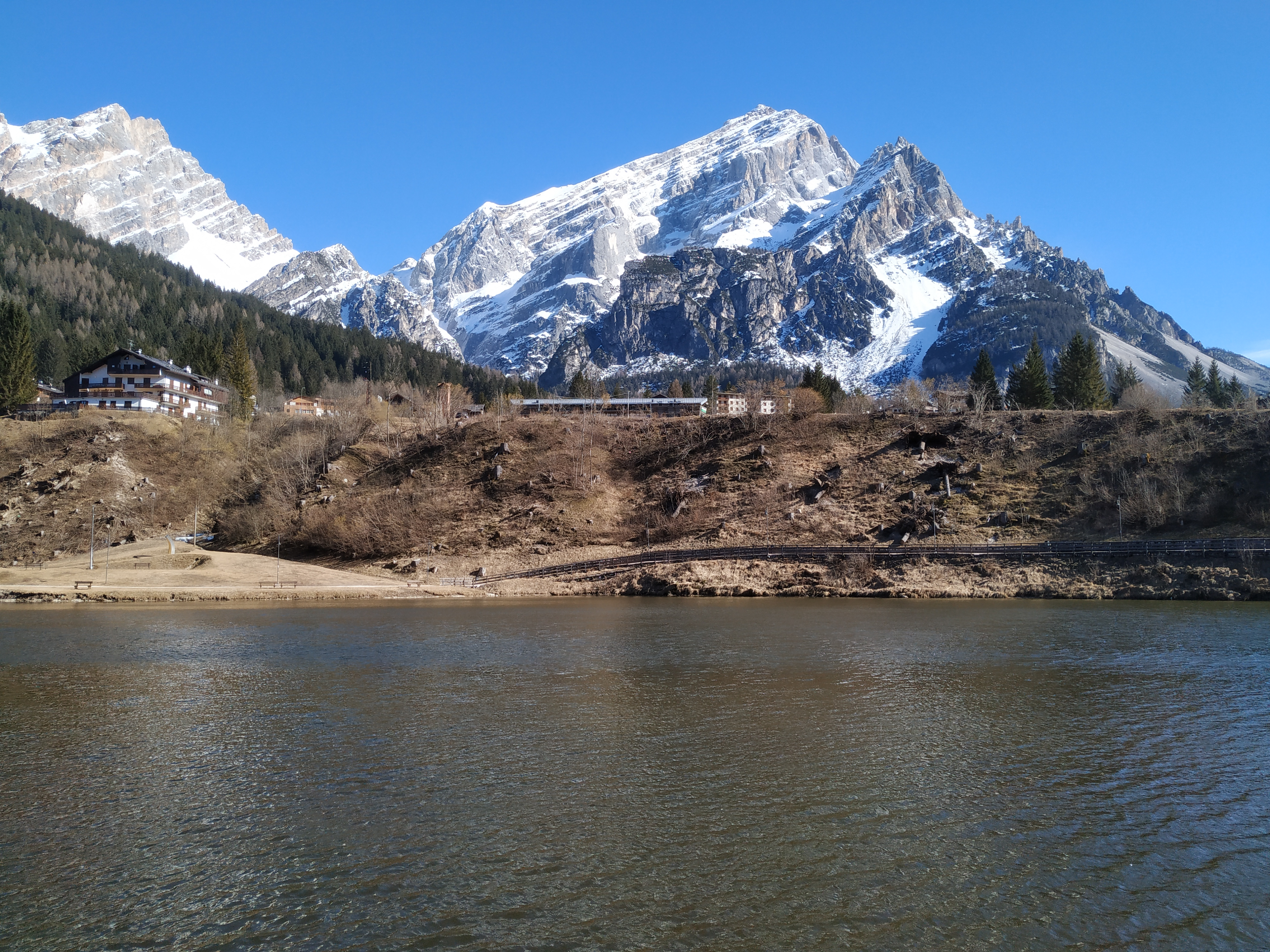
Antelao view from Lago di Mosigo

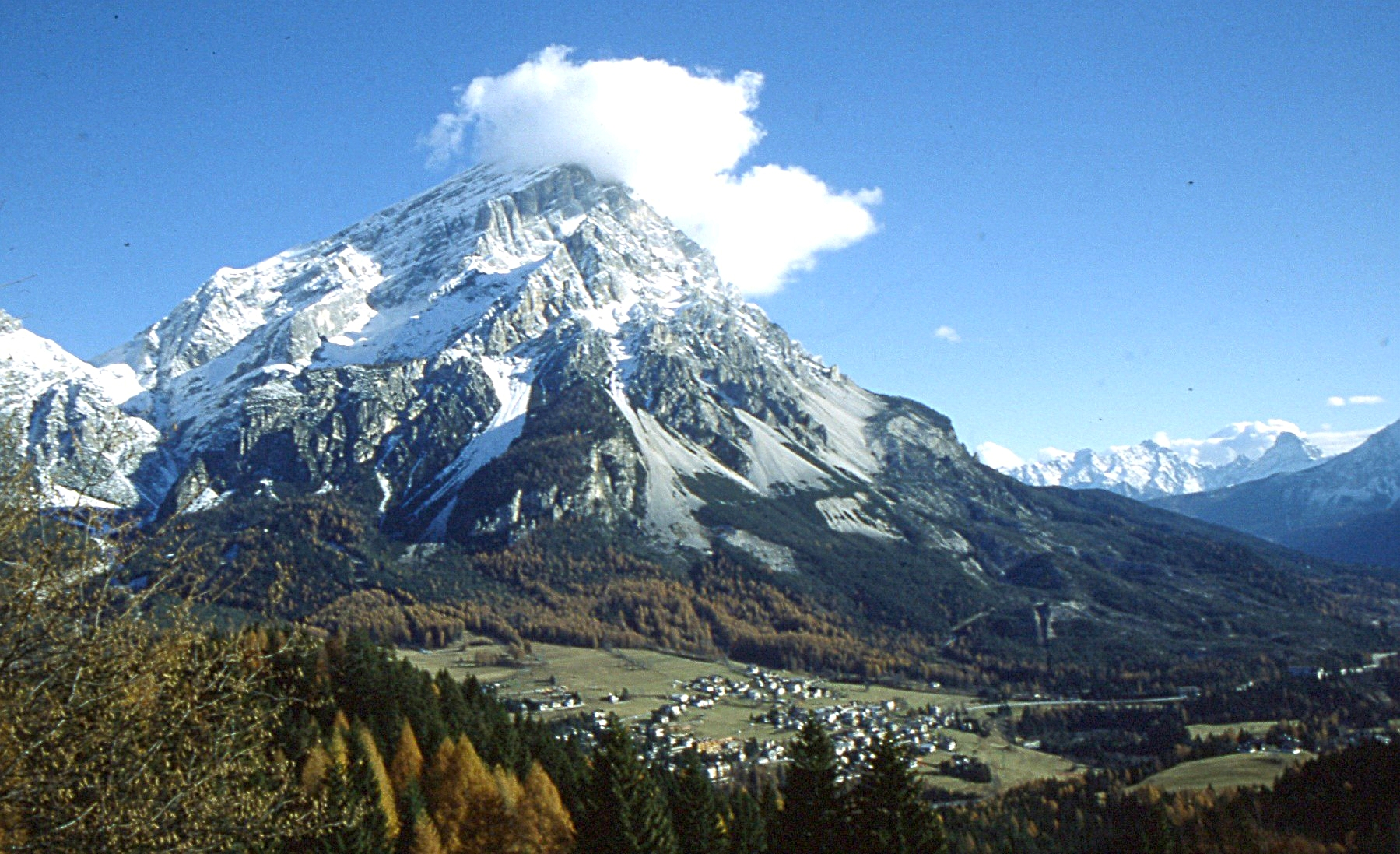

== See also ==
- Golden age of alpinism
- List of mountains of the Alps
- Prominence
