= La Cesta (mountain) =

Mountain in Italy

- Ladin: Ra Zesta
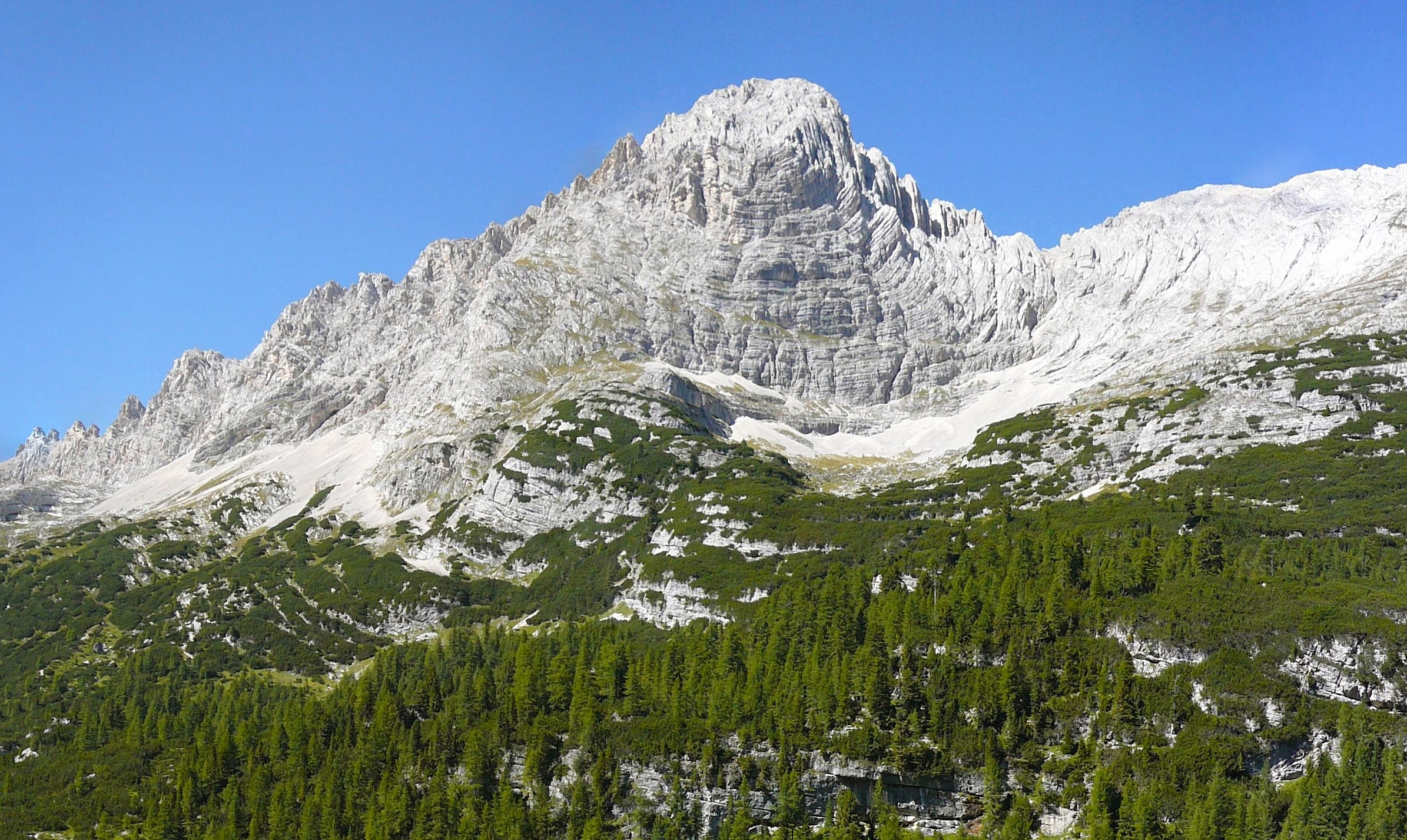
- Southeast aspect

Highest point
- Elevation: 2,768 m (9,081 ft)
- Prominence: 193 m (633 ft)
- Parent peak: Punta Nera
- Isolation: 1.07 km (0.66 mi)
- Coordinates: 46°31′36″N 12°12′31″E

Naming
- Etymology: Basket

Geography
- Location within Italy Location within Alps
- Interactive map of La Cesta
- Country: Italy
- Province: Belluno
- Protected area: Dolomites World Heritage Site
- Parent range: Dolomites; Ampezzo Dolomites
- Topo map: Tabacco 03 Cortina d’Ampezzo e Dolomiti Ampezzane

Geology
- Rock age: Triassic
- Rock type: Dolomite

La Cesta is a mountain in the province of Belluno in northern Italy.

== Description ==
La Cesta, or Ra Zesta in Ladin language, is a 2,768-meter-elevation (9,081-foot) summit in the Dolomites, and as part of the Dolomites is a UNESCO World Heritage site. Set in the Veneto region, the peak is located five kilometers (3.1 miles) east-southeast of the town of Cortina d'Ampezzo. Precipitation runoff from the mountain's slopes drains into tributaries of the Piave. Topographic relief is significant as the summit rises 843 meters (2,766 feet) above Lake Sorapiss in one kilometer (0.6 mile), and 1,450 meters (4,757 feet) above Val d'Ansiei in three kilometers (1.86 miles). The mountain's toponym translates from Italian and Ladin as "The Basket." The nearest higher neighbor is Punta Nera, 1.72 kilometers (1.07 miles) to the southwest.

== Climate ==
Based on the Köppen climate classification, La Cesta is located in an alpine climate zone with long, cold winters, and short, mild summers. Weather systems are forced upwards by the mountains (orographic lift), causing moisture to drop in the form of rain and snow. The months of June through September offer the most favorable weather for visiting or climbing in this area.

== Gallery ==
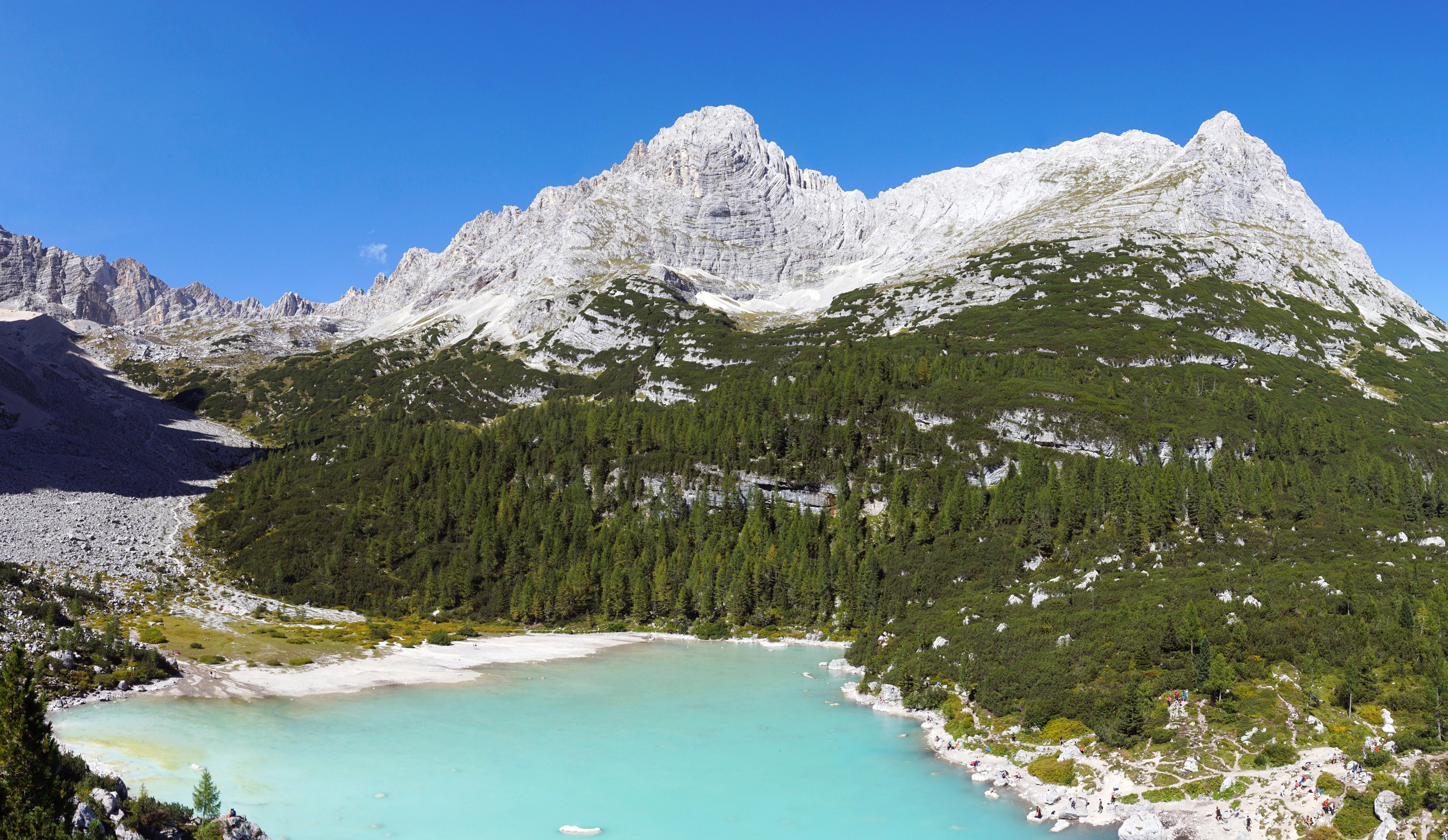
La Cesta (center), Cime del Laudo (right), Lake Sorapiss below

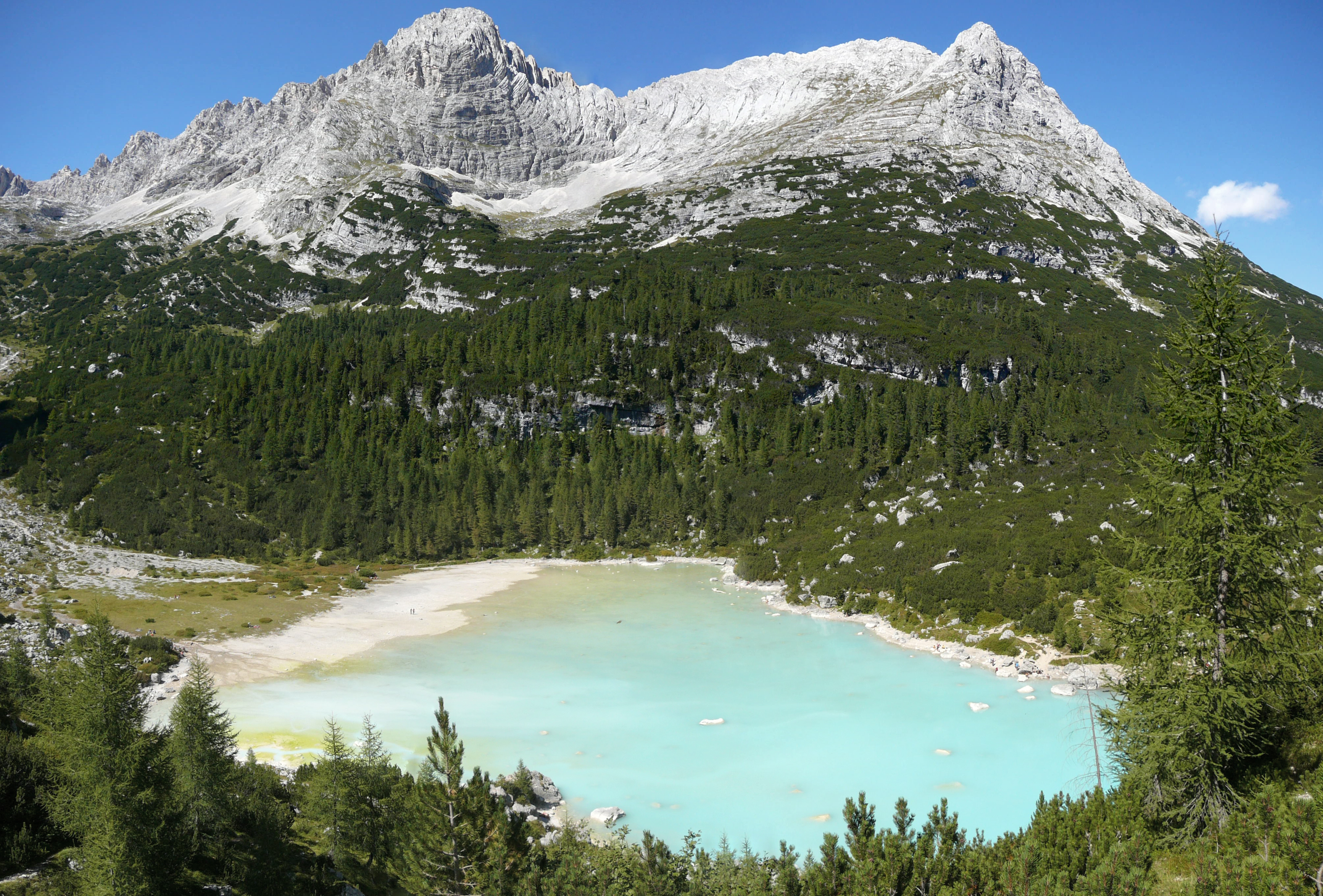
La Cesta (left), Cime del Laudo (right), Lake Sorapiss below

== See also ==
- Southern Limestone Alps
