= Alta Via 1 =

High altitude footpath, Dolomites

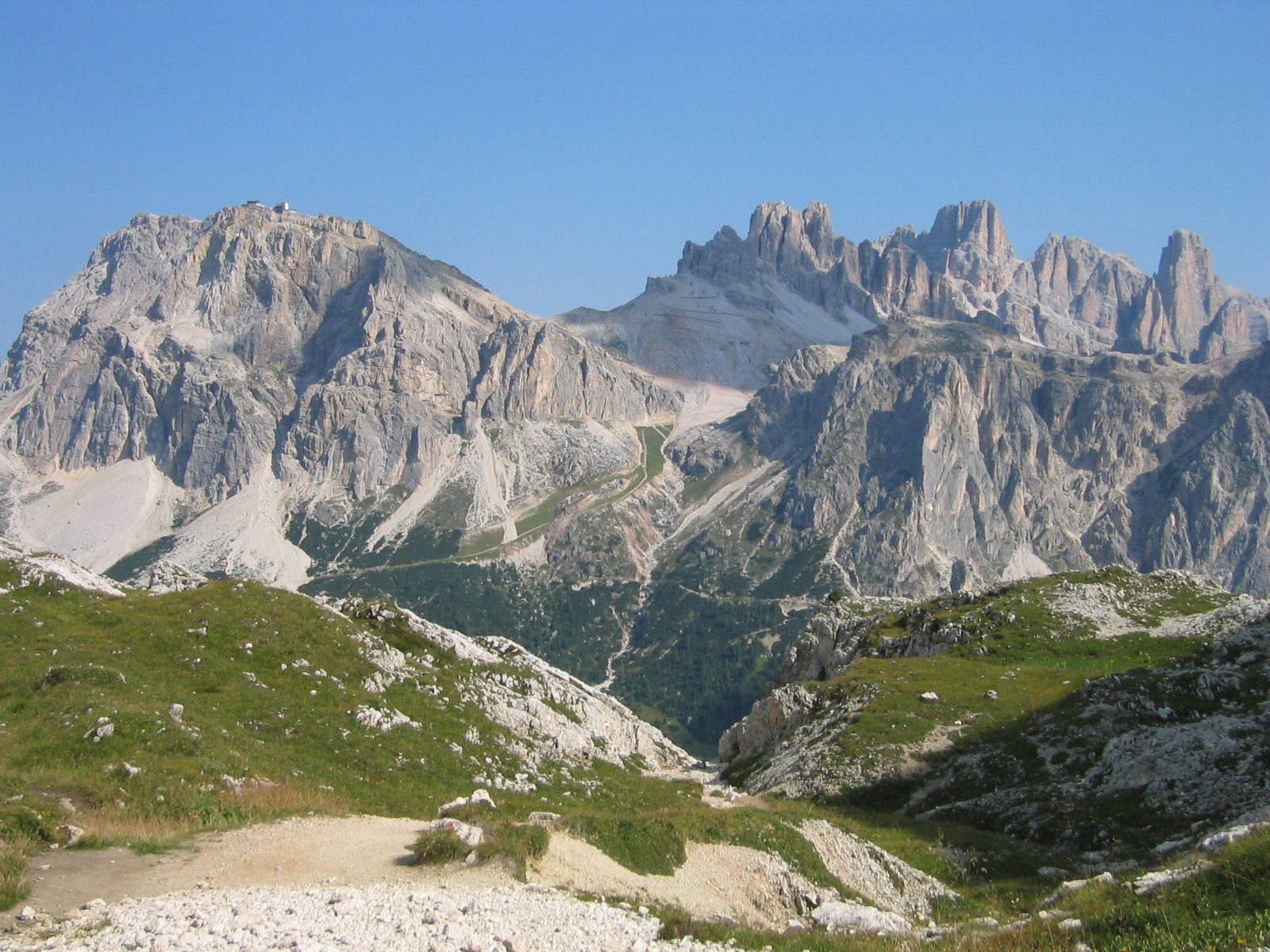
- Alta Via 1 section climbing towards Lagazuoi hut
- Length: 125 kilometres (80 mi) approximately
- Location: Dolomites, Italy
- Trailheads: Pragser Wildsee/Belluno
- Use: Hiking
- Highest point: Lagazuoi, 2,752 m (9,029 ft)
- Lowest point: La Pissa, 448 m (1,470 ft)
- Difficulty: Moderate
- Season: Summer to early autumn
- Months: Late June to mid September

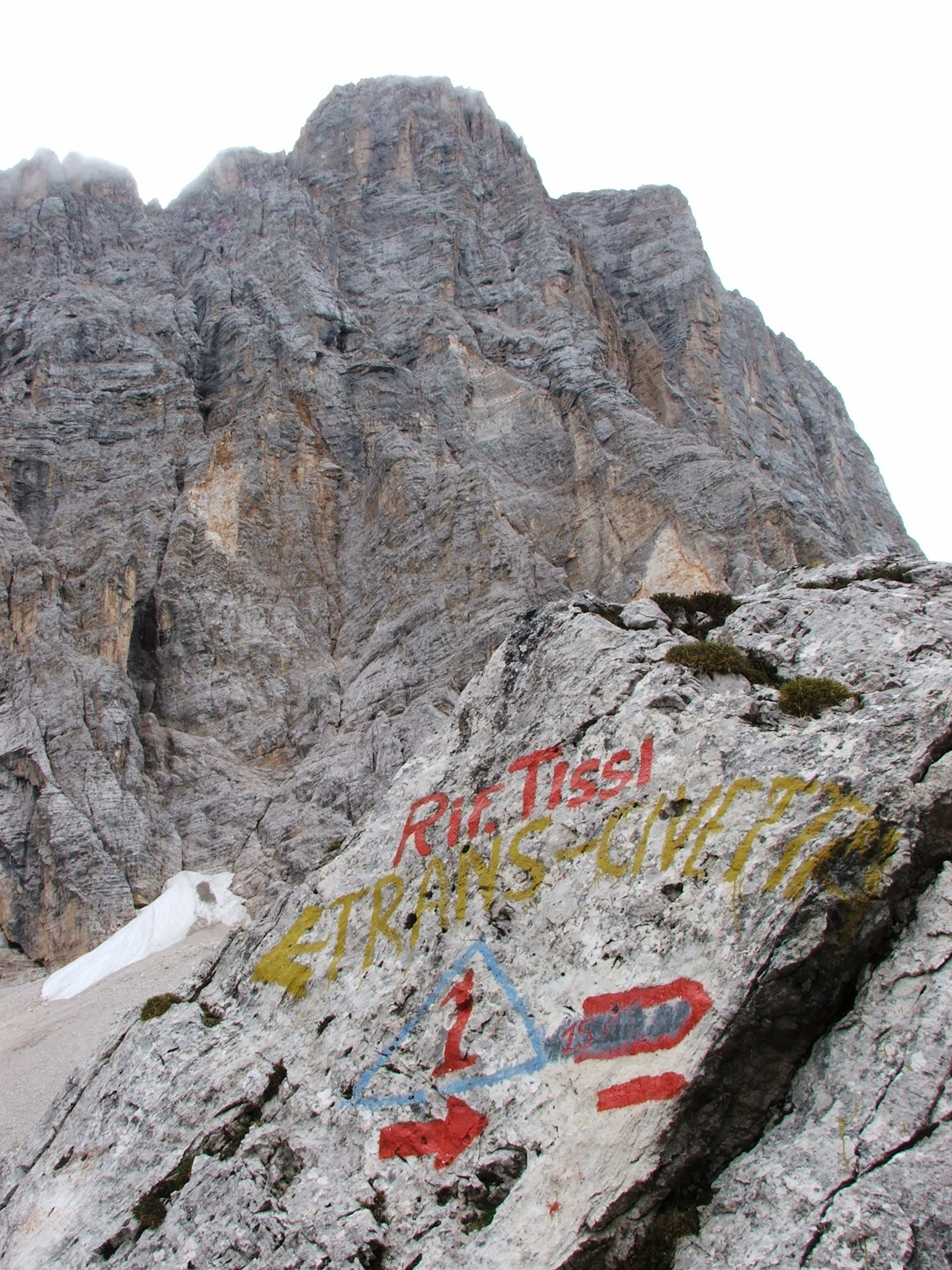
Scene on Alta Via 1

Alta Via 1 is a 125-kilometre-long high-level public footpath which runs through the eastern Dolomites in Italy. It is also known as the Dolomite High Route 1. It passes through some of the finest scenery in the Dolomites. The path runs south from Pragser Wildsee, near Toblach, to Belluno. Prags can be accessed by bus, and Belluno has both train and bus services.

This is the classic high route in the Dolomites, and also the easiest. It gets slightly more difficult as it goes south, but the only section which might present difficulties is the descent from Schiara, and this can be bypassed. About 7–12 days are required to complete the full route. A typical day on the route might involve about seven hours walking, with ascents and descents of about 1000 meters.

The best period for hiking the trail is between late June to the mid-September when the route should be largely free of snow and the refuges are open. The route is signposted by dark blue triangles with an inset number one.

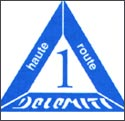
Sign of Alta Via 1

== Maps of the route ==
- Trail on Openstreetmap

The following maps cover the route.

Casa Editrice Tabacco Maps (North to South)

- map number 31 Prags Braies
- map number 3 Cortina and Ampezzano
- map number 15 Pelmo Civetta
- map number 25 Zoldo Agordo area
- map number 24 Dolomites Belluno - Nevegal

other useful Tabacco maps

- map number 1 Cortina - Sexten
- map number 4 Agordo - Zoldo - Pale di S. Martino

Kompass Wanderkarten Maps

- map number 55 Cortina d' Ampezzo
- map number 57 Bruneck Toblach Prags
- map number 77 Alpi Bellunesi

Kompass and Tabacco maps are readily available in the Dolomites.

== Walking the path ==
Camping is forbidden along the route, but there is ample accommodation available in mountain refuges and in valley hotels. There are refuges all along the route. During July and August advance booking is essential.

The Alta Via 1 passes by several Via Ferrata, but none are incorporated in the route, and no special climbing equipment is required.

The highest point on the route is Monte Lagazuoi at 2,750 metres. There is a large refuge on the mountain which has a restaurant and accommodation for 69 people. The route from Monte Lagazuoi descends to Falzarego Pass and then continues south. There is a cable car from the Refugio Lagazuoi to the Falzarego Pass, but a better way to descend would be through the Via Ferrata Lagazuoi Tunnels. This is a World War I tunnel which runs down through the mountain. It is also possible to descend via the Kaiserjaeger Trail and the Martini Ledge. This route passes a number of relics of the fighting that took place here during World War I. The area around Monte Lagazuoi and 5 Torri is a World War I open-air museum.

There are a number of other high-level routes in the Dolomites, including the Alta Via 2, which runs from Brixen to Feltre.

== Itinerary ==
• Stage 1. From Lago di Braies (1,494 m) to Rifugio Biella (2,327 m) – Duration: 3.5 h – Elevation gain: 900 m – Difficulty: E (Hiking)

• Stage 2. From Rifugio Biella (2,327 m) to Rifugio Fanes (2,060 m) – Duration: 4.5 h – Elevation gain: 565 m – Difficulty: T (Tourist path)

• Stage 3. From Rifugio Fanes (2,060 m) to Rifugio Lagazuoi (2,752 m) – Duration: 5 h – Elevation gain: 1,070 m – Difficulty: EE (Experienced hikers)

• Stage 4. From Rifugio Lagazuoi (2,752 m) to Rifugio Nuvolau (2,574 m) – Duration: 5.5 h – Elevation gain: 635 m – Difficulty: EE (Experienced hikers)

• Stage 5. From Rifugio Nuvolau (2,574 m) to Rifugio Città di Fiume (1,917 m) – Duration: 4.5 h – Elevation gain: 260 m – Difficulty: EE/EEA (Experienced hikers / with via ferrata gear)

• Stage 6. From Rifugio Città di Fiume (1,917 m) to Rifugio Palafavera (1,507 m) – Duration: 5.5 h – Elevation gain: 580 m – Difficulty: EE/EEA (Experienced hikers / with via ferrata gear)

• Stage 7. From Rifugio Palafavera (1,507 m) to Rifugio Vazzoler (1,714 m) – Duration: 6 h – Elevation gain: 850 m – Difficulty: E (Hiking)

• Stage 8. From Rifugio Vazzoler (1,714 m) to Rifugio Carestiato (1,834 m) – Duration: 4 h – Elevation gain: 550 m – Difficulty: E (Hiking)

• Stage 9. From Rifugio Carestiato (1,834 m) to Rifugio Sommariva al Pramperét (1,857 m) – Duration: 5 h – Elevation gain: 450 m – Difficulty: E (Hiking)

• Stage 10. From Rifugio Sommariva al Pramperét (1,857 m) to Rifugio Pian de Fontana (1,632 m) – Duration: 3 h – Elevation gain: 540 m – Difficulty: EE (Experienced hikers)

• Stage 11. From Rifugio Pian de Fontana (1,632 m) to Bivacco Marmol (2,266 m) – Duration: 4 h – Elevation gain: 830 m – Difficulty: EE/EEA (Experienced hikers / with via ferrata gear)

• Stage 12. From Bivacco Marmol (2,266 m) to Belluno (Case Bortot) (694 m) – Duration: 5 h – Elevation gain: 100 m – Difficulty: EEA (Via ferrata route – with equipment)

== Variants ==
• Stage 6 (alternative route): From Rifugio Città di Fiume (1,917 m) to Rifugio Palafavera (1,507 m) via Cima Fertazza (2,101 m). Duration: 6.5 h – Elevation gain: 620 m – Difficulty: E (Hiking)

== See also ==
- Dolomites
- Via Ferrata
- Alta Via 2
- Alta Via 3
- Alta Via 4

== Photographs ==
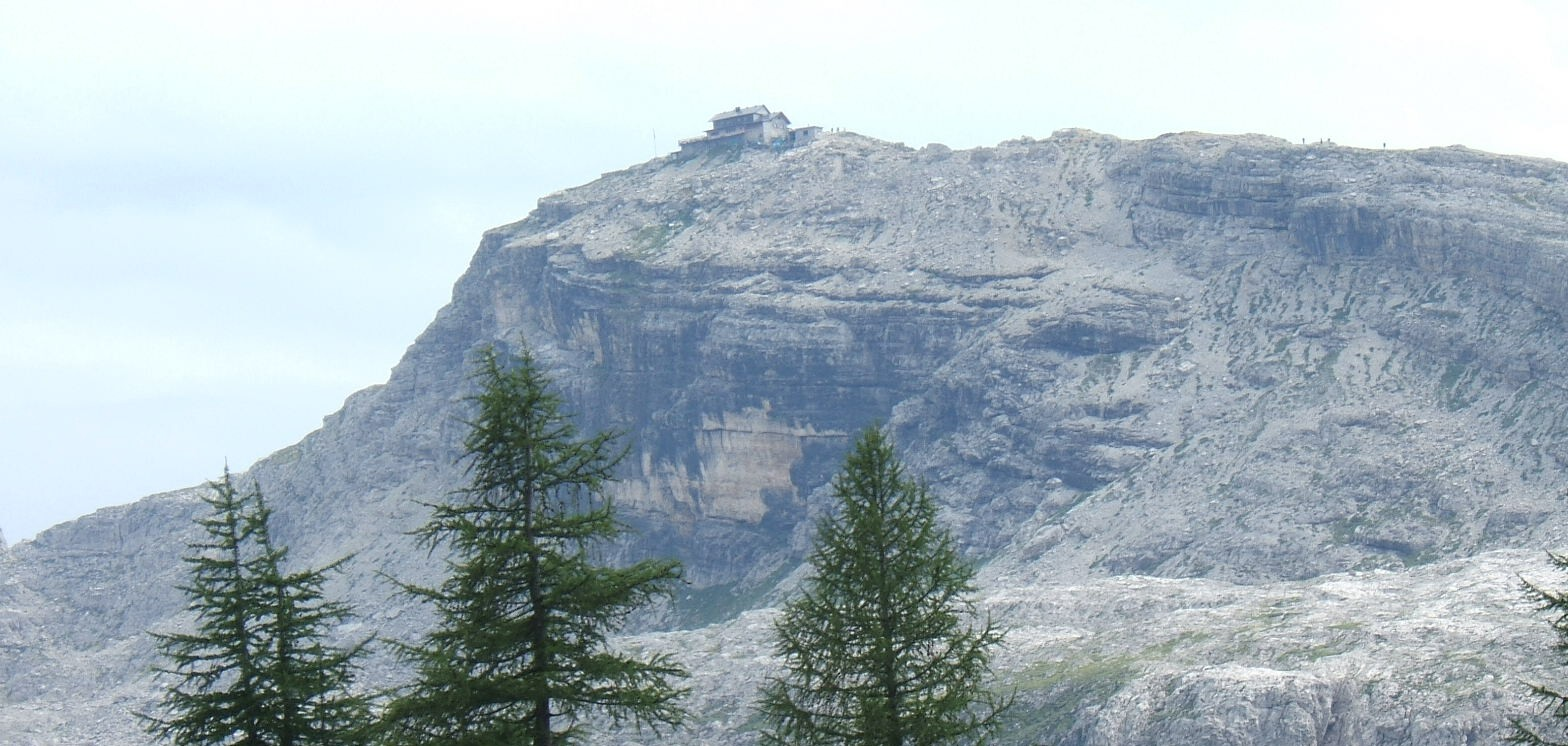
Rifugio Nuvolàu on the Alta Via 1.

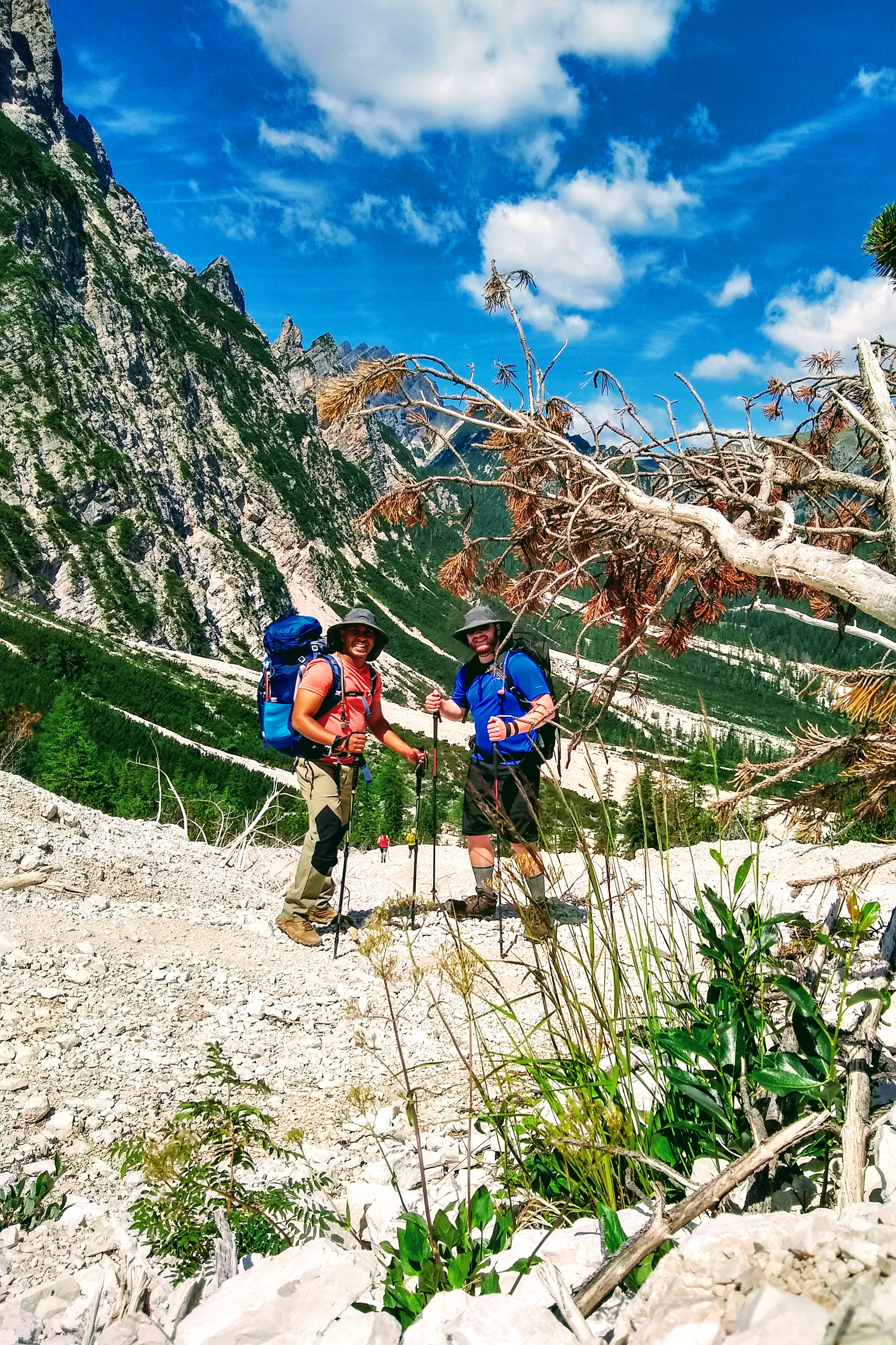
Two hikers at the start of the AV1 near Lago Di Braies.
