= Alta Via 2 =

High altitude footpath, Dolomites

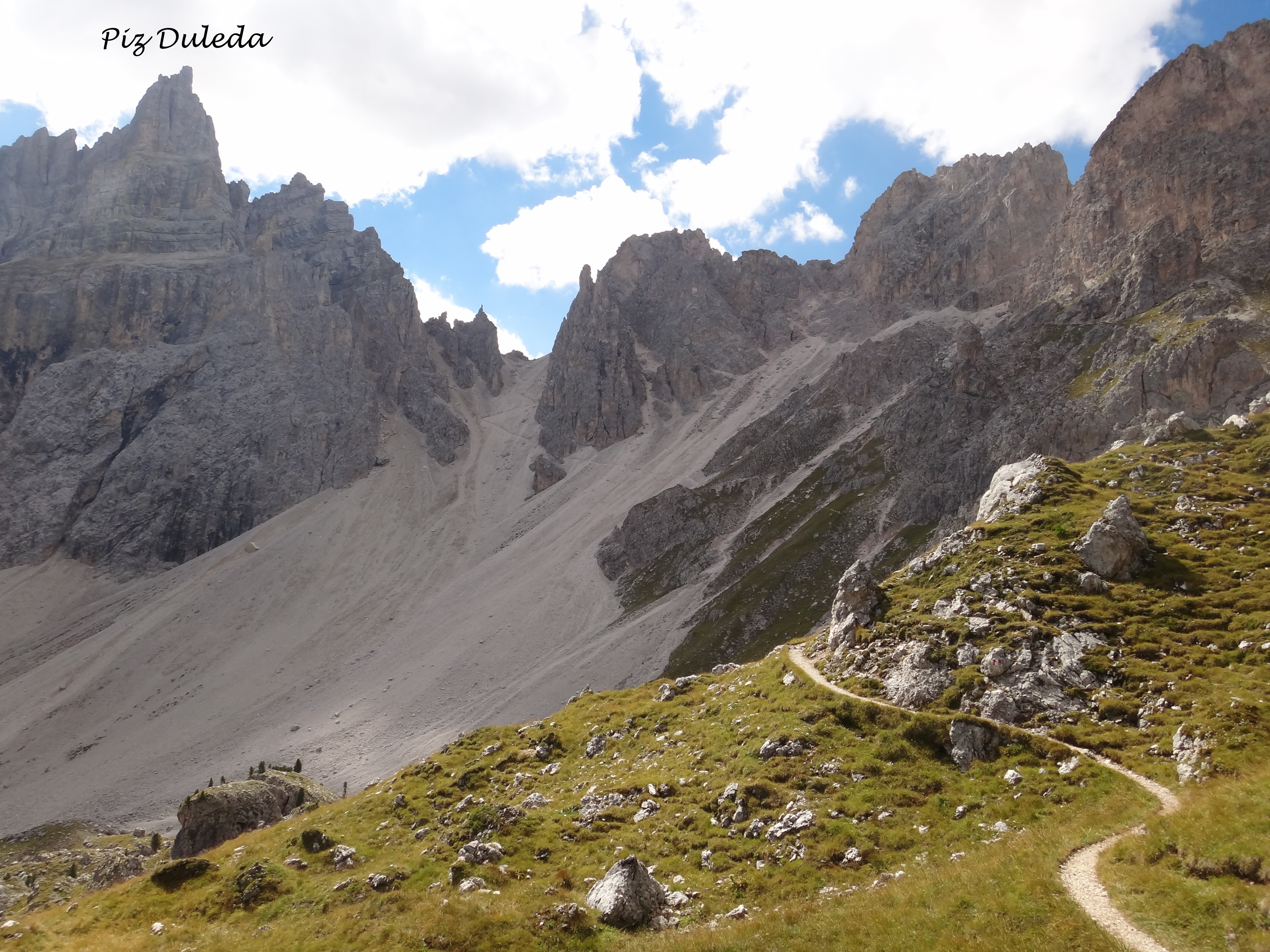
- from Rifugio Genova to Rifugio Puez
- Length: 180 kilometres (110 mi) approximately
- Location: Dolomites, Italy
- Trailheads: Brixen/Croce d'Aune
- Use: Hiking
- Elevation gain/loss: approximately 11,300 m (37,073 ft) gain 11,200 m (36,745 ft) loss
- Highest point: Forcella Marmolada, 2,885 m (9,465 ft)
- Difficulty: Moderate to challenging
- Season: Summer to early autumn
- Months: Late June to mid September

Alta via 2 is a high route located in the Italian Dolomites between Brixen (Bressanone) in the north and Croce d'Aune near Feltre in the south.

The route is nicknamed "The High Route of the legends" and indeed with the exception of its initial and final segments, it maintains an altitude of at least 1300 meters.

The trail passes through various mountain ranges including Plose-Putia, Puez-Odle, Sella, Marmolada, Pale di San Martino and Vette Feltrine, and crosses 30 mountain passes.

== Features ==
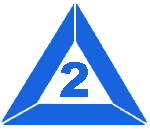
Alta Via 2 route marker

The Alta Via 2 is a physically demanding trail. It is approximately 180 km long, with a total combined altitude gain of and loss of approximately 23,000 meters. Some sections of the route are exposed or steep. Although no specific mountaineering skills are required, hikers must have a good head for heights and good physical fitness.

The route has extended sections of via ferrata. Via ferrata equipment is recommended in these sections. Some of these via ferrata sections can be bypassed if desired. Experience of walking in mountain country is vital and, because mountain weather can change very rapidly, and hikers should be suitably prepared.

The most demanding part is crossing the Marmolada mountain. This section of the hike goes through via ferrata and a small glacier. The risk of falling into crevasse is minimal on this glacier, however crampons may be needed as the glacier is quite steep. Hikers who are not prepared or not willing to take along the needed equipment can take the alternative route which bypasses Marmolada and leads from Pian di Fedaia Rifugio Marmolada to Malga Ciapela and then to Rifugio Fuciade, where it connects with the original path. Hikers who chose this alternative route often take the bus from Pian di Fedaia Rifugio Marmolada to Malga Ciapela as this part consists of asphalt road.

The trail is well marked with red and white paint splashes, cairns, and occasional dark blue triangular symbols containing the number '2'.

The entire journey usually takes between 12-15 days. Most hikers walk the trail from north to south, which is the way the route is described in the most guidebooks.

== Accommodation ==
Alta Via 2 is a hut to hut trail, so that each section ends with a hut or rifugi, that offers food and accommodation. Most rifugi are owned and managed by Club Alpino Italiano (CAI) which are usually somewhat cheaper than private rifugi.

== Sections ==
The trail can be partitioned into sections in many ways, depending on fitness and the route variants chosen. The following is a popular 13-day itinerary. All distances and hiking times are approximate.

| Section# | Start | Destination | Distance | Hours | Ascent Meters | Descent Meters | Difference |
|---|---|---|---|---|---|---|---|
| 1 | Brixen (Cable car S. Andrea) | Rifugio Ploss | 27 km | 1:15 | 380 m | | +380 m |
| 2 | Rifugio Ploss | Rifugio Schlüter | 15 km | 5:00 | 500 m | 650 m | -150 m |
| 3 | Rifugion Schlüter | Rifugio Puez | 15 km | 6:00 | 850 m | 670 m | +180 m |
| 4 | Rifugio Puez | Rifugio Pisciadù | 10km | 5:00 | 570 m | 460 m | +90 m |
| 5 | Rifugio Pisciadù | Rifugio Castiglioni Marmolada | 19 km | 6:30-7:00 | 750 m | 1,280 m | -530 m |
| 6 | Rifugio Castiglioni Marmolada | Passo di San Pellegrino | 9+16 km | 2:00+5:00 | 1,100 m | 1,200 m | -100 m |
| 7 | Passo di San Pellegrino | Rifugio Volpi al Mulaz | 14 km | 7:00 | 1,100 m | 500 m | +600 m |
| 8 | Rifugio Volpi al Mulaz | Rifugio Pedrotti | 8 km | 5:00 | 760 m | 750 m | +10 m |
| 9 | Rifugio Pedrotti | Rifugio Treviso | 14 km | 7:00 | 720 m | 1,600 m | -880 m |
| 10 | Rifugio Treviso | Passo Ceréda | 10 km | 4:30 | 1,150 m | 900 m | +250 m |
| 11 | Passo Ceréda | Rifugio Boz | 14 km | 6:30 | 1,200 m | 600 m | +600 m |
| 12 | Rifugio Boz | Rifugio Dai Piaz | 15 km | 7:00 | 900 m | 650 m | +250 m |
| 13 | Rifugio Dai Piaz | Croce d’Aune and Feltre | 19 km | 6:00 | | 1,670 m | -1,670 m |

== Gallery ==
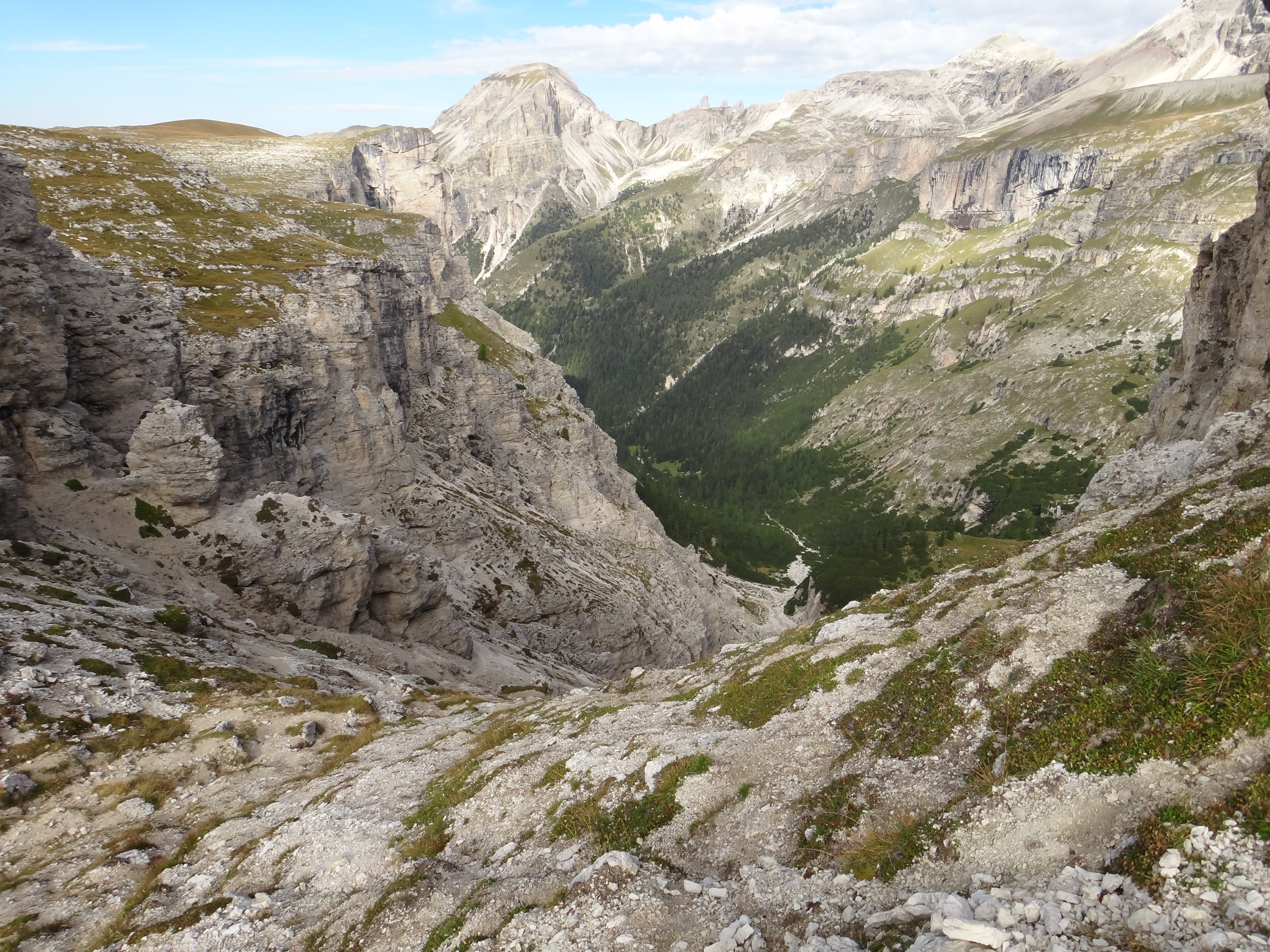
Rifugio Puez to Rifugio Boè

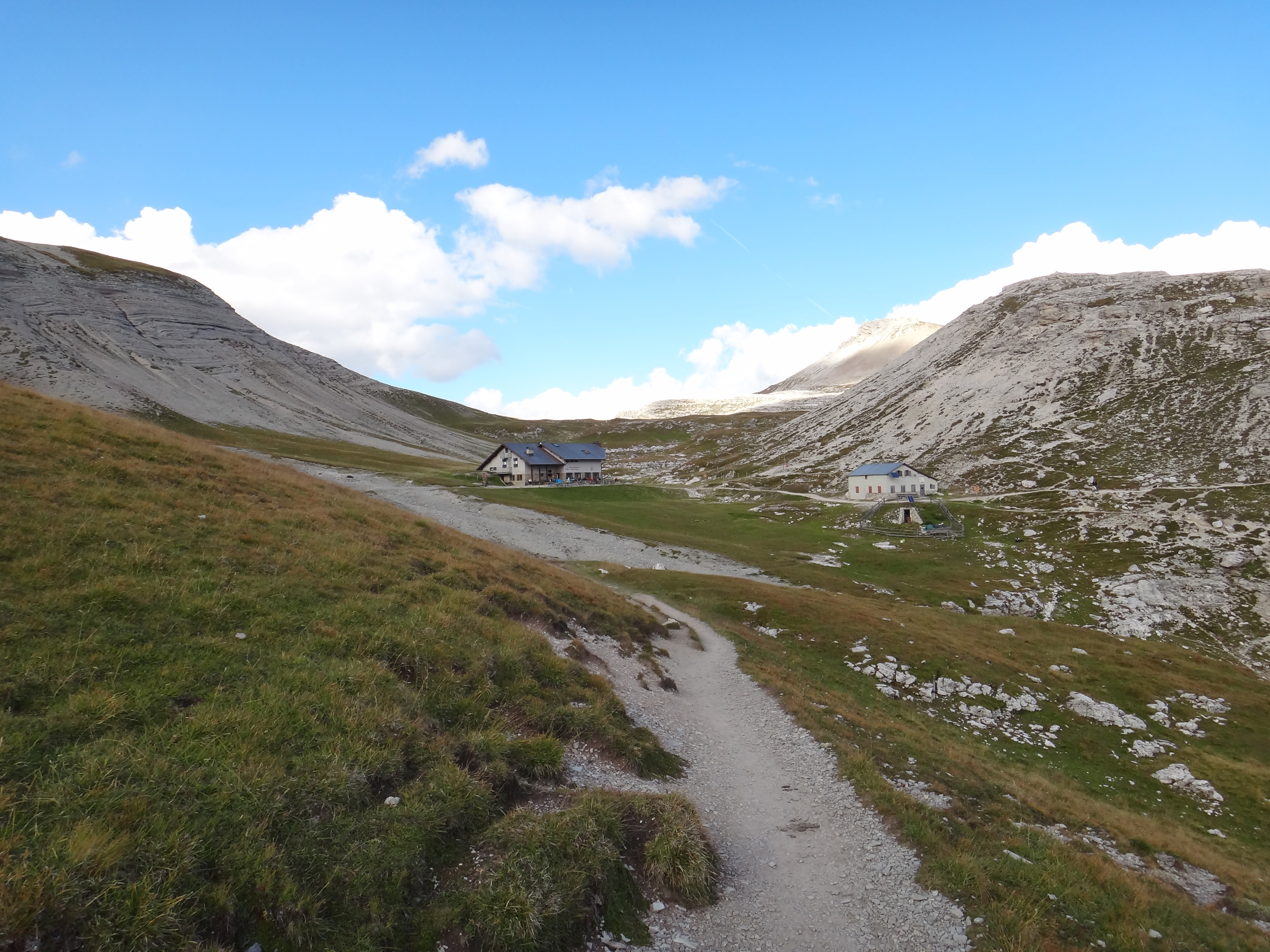
Rifugio Genova to Rifugio Puez

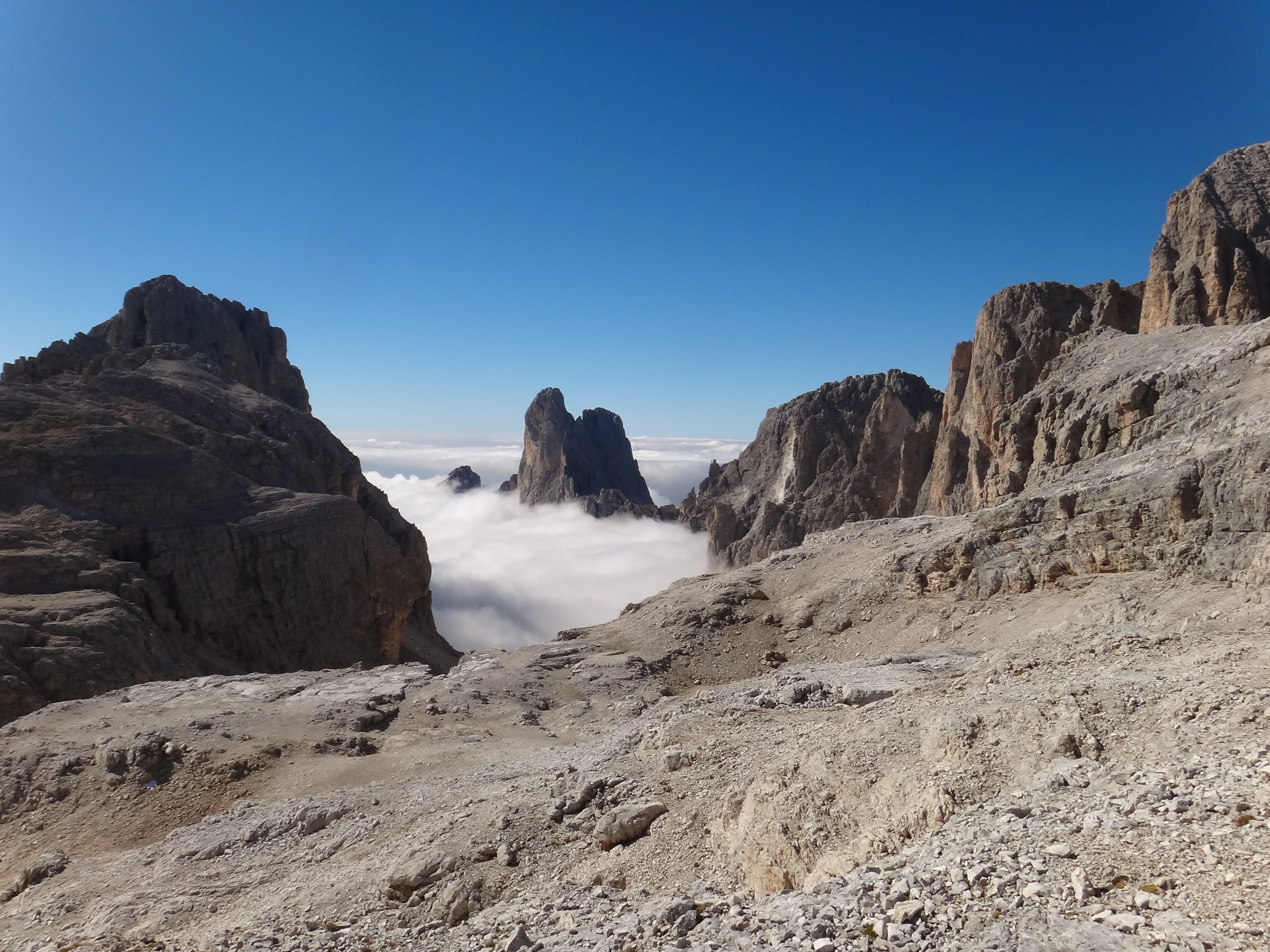
Rifugio Rosetta to Rifugio Treviso

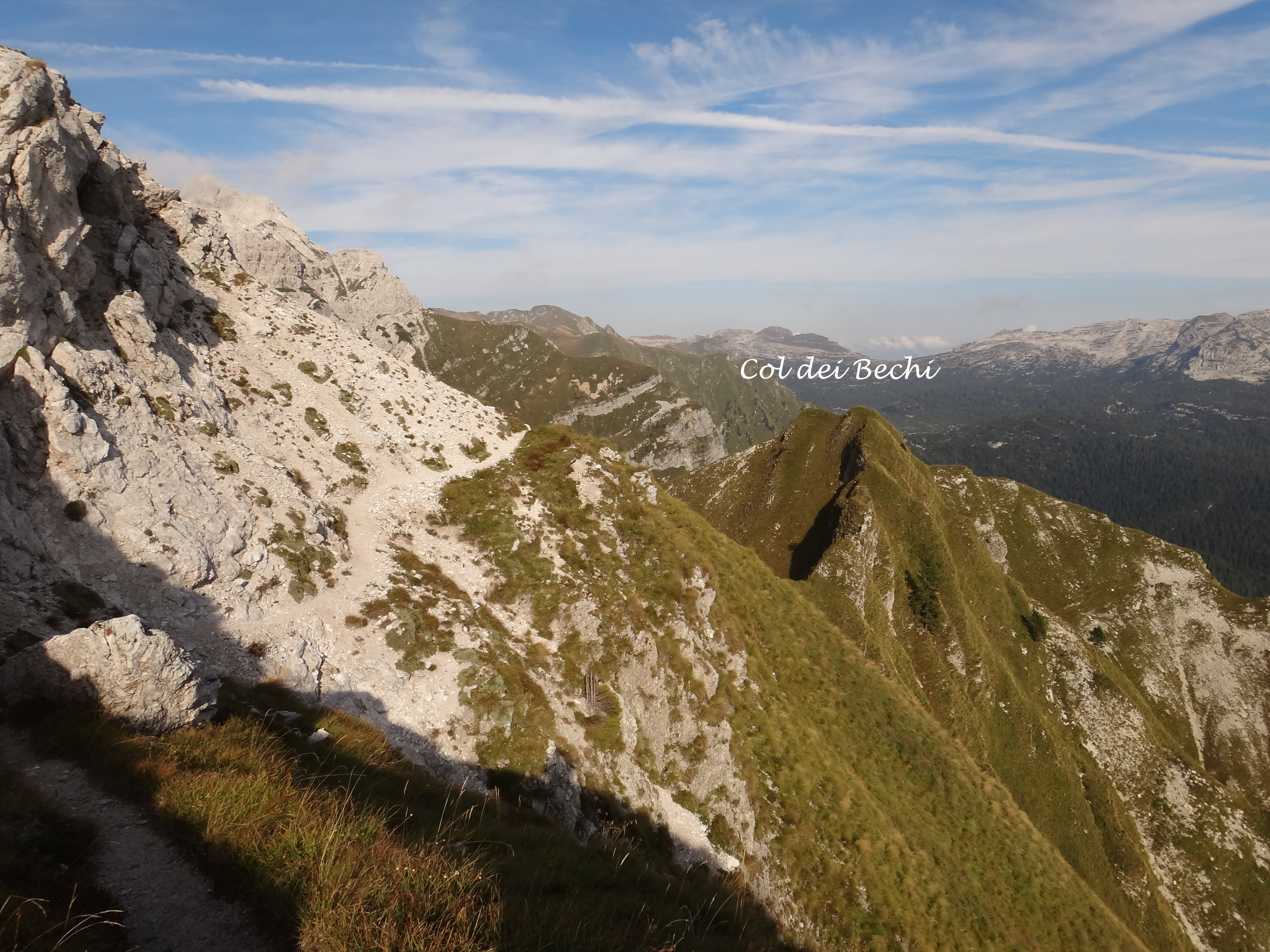
Rifugio Passo Cereda to Rifugio Bòz

== See also ==
- Dolomites
- Via Ferrata
- Alta Via 1
- Alta Via 3
- Alta Via 4
