= March 1904 =

Month of 1904

<<	March 1904					>>
Su	Mo	Tu	We	Th	Fr	Sa
		1	2	3	4	5
6	7	8	9	10	11	12
13	14	15	16	17	18	19
20	21	22	23	24	25	26
27	28	29	30	31

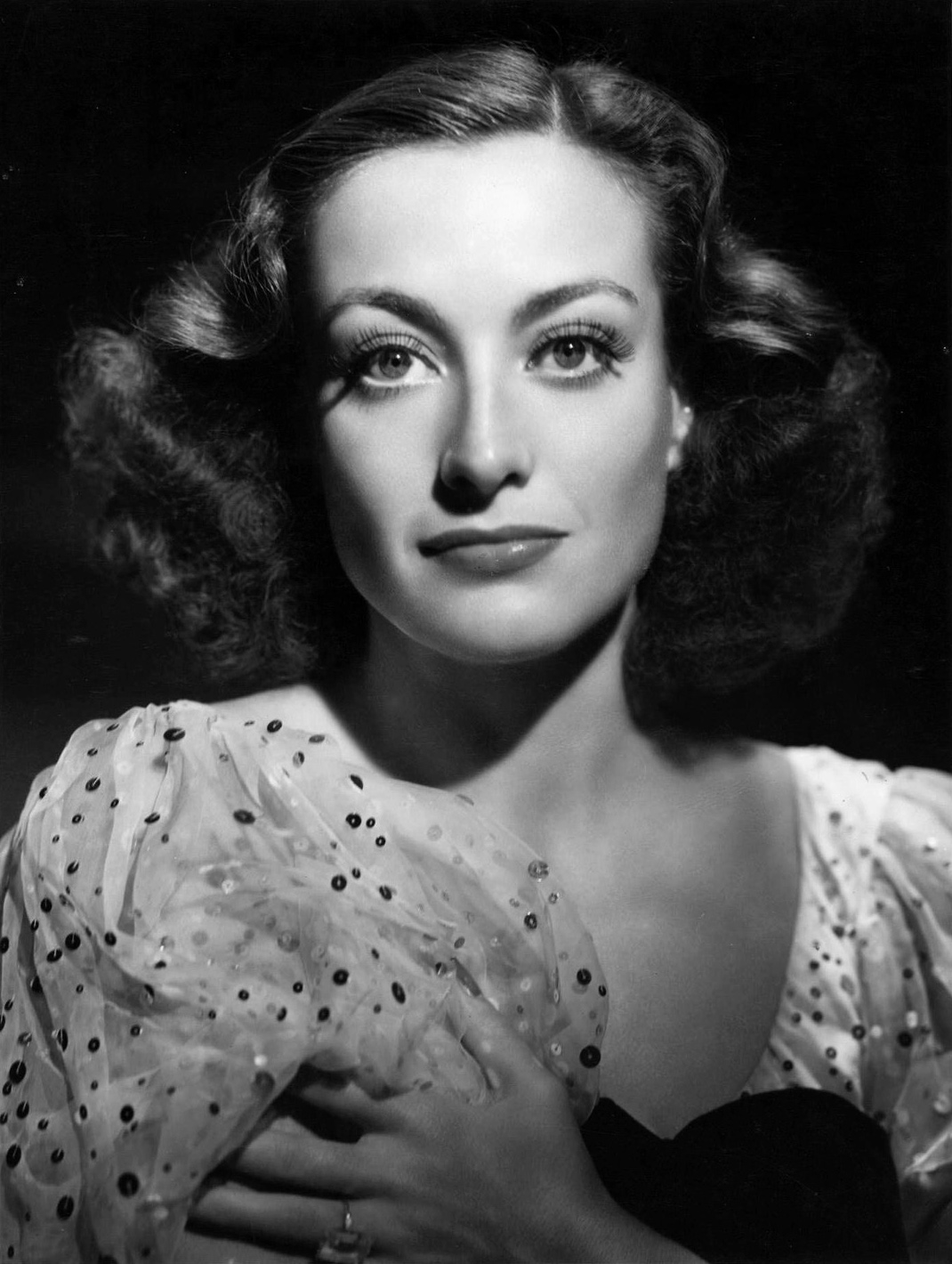
American actress Joan Crawford, most probably born on March 23, 1904

The following events occurred in March 1904:

== March 1, 1904 (Tuesday) ==
- A rehearsal of Czech composer Antonín Dvořák's new opera Armida ran into problems and terminated early.
- Born:
  - Paul Dubreil, French mathematician; in Le Mans, Maine, France (d. 1994)
  - Paul Hartman, American actor and dancer; in San Francisco, California (d. 1973, heart attack)
  - Bogdan Kobulov, member of Soviet security and police apparatus; in Tbilisi, Russian Empire (d. 1953, executed)
  - Glenn Miller (born Alton Glenn Miller), American bandleader; in Clarinda, Iowa (disappeared, presumed dead 1944)
  - Pablo O'Higgins (born Paul Higgins Stevenson), American Mexican artist; in Salt Lake City, Utah (d. 1983)
  - Antoun Saadeh, Lebanese politician, philosopher and writer; in Dhour El Choueir, Beirut Vilayet, Ottoman Empire (d. 1949, executed by firing squad)
- Died:
  - Benjamin Taylor A Bell (born Benjamin Taylor Bell), 42, Scottish-born Canadian journalist, died of injuries from a fall down an elevator shaft.
  - James G. Blair, 79, member of the United States House of Representatives from Missouri
  - Francis Boott, 90, American composer
  - G. W. Hunt, 66, English writer of music hall songs ("MacDermott's War Song"), died of softening of the brain.
  - Noah Raby, 81 or 131, American longevity claimant
  - Sir John Scott KCMG, DCL, 62, English cricketer and judge, died of heart and liver trouble.

== March 2, 1904 (Wednesday) ==
- In Manhattan, New York City, the Hotel Darlington, an apartment building under construction, collapsed, killing 20 people. Most of the dead were construction workers; also killed was Mrs. Ella Lacey Storrs, who was eating lunch in the dining room of the Hotel Patterson, a neighboring building. One construction worker, Edwin Lask, would be rescued shortly after 2:00 a.m. on March 4 after being trapped under debris for over 30 hours, but would die shortly afterwards on the way to the hospital.
- Born:
  - Henry Dreyfuss, American industrial designer; in Brooklyn, New York City (d. 1972, suicide by carbon monoxide poisoning)
  - Jan Mertens, Belgian professional cyclist; in Hoboken, Antwerp, Belgium (d. 1964)
  - Dr. Seuss (born Theodor Seuss Geisel), American children's author (The Cat in the Hat) and Caldecott Honor winner; in Springfield, Massachusetts (d. 1991)
  - Elsie Mary Wisdom (born Elsie Mary Gleed), English automobile racer; in Tooting Graveney, London, England (d. 1972)
- Died: Mary C. Billings (born Mary Charlotte Ward), 79, American evangelist and missionary

== March 3, 1904 (Thursday) ==
- Wilhelm II, German Emperor, became the first person to make a recording of a political document, using Thomas Edison's phonograph cylinder.
- Spain passed a Sunday rest law.
- A major flood caused by the breaking of ice gorges began on the Susquehanna River in Pennsylvania. It would continue through March 15, causing damage estimated at between $2,000,000 and $8,000,000. Several bridges were destroyed or seriously damaged. The village of Collins, Pennsylvania, was destroyed. On the afternoon of March 8, after a Pennsylvania Railroad bridge was washed away, most of the village of Safe Harbor, Pennsylvania, was destroyed. The flood caused no fatalities.
- Born:
  - Mayo Methot, American actress; in Chicago, Illinois (d. 1951, complications of alcoholism)
  - Harry Werner Storz, German Olympic sprinter; in Halle, Germany (d. 1982)
- Died:
  - Walter Anderson, 25, English footballer, died of pneumonia.
  - E. T. Jones, 53, English Olympic long-distance swimmer
  - William Henry Harrison Murray, a.k.a. "Adirondack Murray", 64, American clergyman and author

== March 4, 1904 (Friday) ==
- Russian troops in Korea retreated toward Manchuria, followed by 100,000 Japanese troops.
- Born:
  - Luis Carrero Blanco, Prime Minister of Spain; in Santoña, Spain (d. 1973, assassinated)
  - George Gamow (born Georgiy Antonovich Gamov), Ukrainian-born American physicist and polymath; in Odessa, Russian Empire (d. 1968, liver failure)
  - Norman Robertson, Canadian diplomat; in Vancouver, British Columbia, Canada (d. 1968)
  - Joseph Schmidt, Austrian-Hungarian tenor and actor; in Davydivka, Storozhynets, Bukovina, Austria-Hungary (d. 1942, heart attack)
  - Elias Venezis (pseudonym of Elias Mellos), Greek novelist; in Ayvalık, Ottoman Empire (d. 1973, laryngeal cancer)
- Died:
  - Mauritz Aarflot, 82, Norwegian editor, member of the Storting
  - Charles Poisot, 81, French musician
  - Sir Joseph Trutch, KCMG, 78, English-born Canadian engineer, surveyor and politician, first Lieutenant Governor of British Columbia

== March 5, 1904 (Saturday) ==
- Near Irondale, Ohio, two Cleveland & Pittsburg Railroad trains were attempting to cross a bridge over Yellow Creek close together when the bridge collapsed. Of the ten railroad employees on the two trains, six drowned and the other four were injured. Rain on March 3 had weakened the bridge.
- Born:
  - Haig Acterian, Romanian film and theater director, author and fascist activist; in Constanța, Kingdom of Romania (d. 1943, killed in action)
  - Mao Bangchu, Republic of China air force general; in Shanghai, China (d. 1987)
  - Emile Decroix, Belgian racing cyclist; in Geluveld, West Flanders, Belgium (d. 1967)
  - Pei Wenzhong, Chinese paleontologist, archaeologist and anthropologist; in Fengnan District, Hebei, Qing Dynasty (d. 1982)
  - Karl Rahner, German Roman Catholic priest and theologian; in Freiburg im Breisgau, Grand Duchy of Baden, German Empire (d. 1984)
- Died:
  - Thompson Cooper, 67, English journalist and man of letters
  - John Lowther du Plat Taylor CB VD, 74–75, British founder of the Army Post Office Corps
  - Alfred von Waldersee, 71, Imperial German Army marshal

== March 6, 1904 (Sunday) ==
- A Japanese squadron bombarded Vladivostok, causing minor damage.
- The Scottish National Antarctic Expedition, led by William Speirs Bruce, discovered the Antarctic region of Coats Land from the Scotia.
- Beginning at noon at Novilly, France, Pini, an Italian fencing master, and Baron Athos di San Malatos fought a duel with swords which lasted for two hours and fifty minutes. The duel ended due to a blister on the palm of Malatos' right hand. Pini and Malatos were reconciled after the duel.
- In Springfield, Ohio, Richard Dickerson, an African American man, shot and wounded his common-law wife, Anna Corbin (also African American), and shot Patrolman Charles B. Collis of the Springfield Police Department four times.
- Born:
  - Leslie Ablett, British police officer and Olympic water polo player; in Birkenhead, Merseyside, England (d. 1952)
  - José Antonio Aguirre, Basque footballer, politician and activist; in Bilbao, Spain (d. 1960, heart attack)
  - Andy Aitkenhead, Scottish Canadian National Hockey League goaltender; in Glasgow, Scotland (d. 1968)
  - Hugh Williams, English actor and dramatist; in Bexhill-on-Sea, East Sussex, England (d. 1969, aortic aneurysm)
- Died: Hans Hermann Behr, 85, German American physician and scientist, died of heart failure.

== March 7, 1904 (Monday) ==
- The fleet of Japanese Admiral Tōgō Heihachirō bombarded Port Arthur and Dalny.
- Three officers selected by the British War Office to serve as military attachés and observers in the Russo-Japanese War arrived by train in Vancouver, British Columbia, and embarked on the Athenian for Yokohama. Lt. Gen. Sir William Nicholson was assigned to study troop transport methods, Lt. Col. Aylmer Haldane to observe general field work, and Capt. Herbert Cyril Thacker of the Canadian Militia to study artillery. Nicholson commented in an interview: "I shall certainly not follow the Russian side of the struggle, for aside from any question of neutrality my personal sympathies are all with the Japanese."
- In Berlin, Germany, former German Army officer and newspaper publisher Karl Bezeke killed himself and his entire family. Bezeke, who had lost his fortune, held a birthday dinner for his 19-year-old daughter, then poisoned his wife, his daughter, his 16- and 12-year-old sons and himself with potassium cyanide.
- The Norwegian cargo ship Siberia sank after a collision with the Norwegian steamship Simon Dumois off Fort McHenry in Baltimore, Maryland.
- In Springfield, Ohio, Patrolman Charles B. Collis, whom Richard Dickerson had shot the previous day, died of his injuries at noon. Late that evening a lynch mob of 1,750 men seized Dickerson from jail, shot him to death and then hung him from a telegraph pole, allowing the crowd to shoot at his body with revolvers for about 30 minutes. According to the Newark Advocate, "Throughout it all perfect good order was maintained and every one seemed in the best of humor, joking with his nearest neighbor while reloading his revolver."
- Three men were killed in a collision between two freight trains on the Missouri Pacific Railroad, 4 miles (6.4 km) east of Jefferson City, Missouri.
- Born:
  - Ivar Ballangrud (born Ivar Eriksen), Norwegian Olympic champion speed skater; in Lunner, Norway (d. 1969)
  - Virginia Downing, American stage actress; in Washington, D.C. (d. 1996, heart attack)
  - Jim Ganly, Irish cricketer and rugby union player; in Balscadden, Howth, County Dublin, Ireland (d. 1976, shooting accident)
  - Reinhard Heydrich, German Nazi official; in Halle an der Saale, Province of Saxony, Kingdom of Prussia, German Empire (d. 1942, assassinated)
  - Kurt Weitzmann, German American art historian; in Kleinalmerode (Witzenhausen, near Kassel, Germany) (d. 1993)
  - Ladislav Ženíšek, Czech footballer and manager; in Vinohrady, Prague, Austria-Hungary (d. 1985)
- Died: Ferdinand André Fouqué, 75, French geologist

== March 8, 1904 (Tuesday) ==
- In Springfield, Ohio, the day after Richard Dickerson was lynched, large numbers of sightseers visited the site of his death. That evening, a mob of between 1000 and 1500 men attacked the "Levee", a district of saloons operated primarily by African Americans, burning down seven buildings valued at $11,600. There were no fatalities because the police had warned occupants to leave earlier in the day.
- The framework for the Russian building at the forthcoming Louisiana Purchase Exposition in St. Louis, Missouri, was torn down in accordance with orders received from Saint Petersburg.
- Born:
  - Aleardo Donati, Italian Olympic wrestler; in Bentivoglio, Province of Bologna, Emilia-Romagna, Italy (d. 1990)
  - Viktor de Kowa (born Victor Paul Karl Kowalczyk), German actor, singer and director; in Hohkirch, Province of Silesia, Kingdom of Prussia, German Empire (d. 1973)
- Died:
  - Adolfo Bullrich, 70, Argentine banker and politician
  - Celso Hermínio, 33, Portuguese caricaturist and comics artist, died of pneumonia.
  - Robert Taber, 38–39, American actor, died of pleurisy.

== March 9, 1904 (Wednesday) ==
- In Saint Petersburg, Russia, Finance Minister Vladimir Kokovtsov definitively announced that Russia would not exhibit at the Louisiana Purchase Exposition due to the Russo-Japanese War.
- Born:
  - Gerald Abraham, English musicologist; in Newport, Great Britain (d. 1988)
  - Ellen Frank, German actress; in Aurich, German Empire (d. 1999)
  - A. H. M. Jones, British historian; in Birkenhead, Cheshire, England (d. 1970, heart attack)
  - Paul Wilbur Klipsch, American acoustical engineer and inventor; in Elkhart, Indiana (d. 2002)
  - Silvio Pietroboni, Italian Olympic and professional footballer; in Milan, Province of Milan, Kingdom of Italy (d. 1987)
- Died:
  - Emma Hellenstainer (born Emerentiana Hausbacher), 86, Tyrolean businesswoman
  - Robert Machray, 72, Anglican bishop and missionary, first Primate of All Canada
  - Hiram F. Stevens, 51, American lawyer, politician and academic

== March 10, 1904 (Thursday) ==
- The Imperial Russian Navy destroyer Steregushchiy, deliberately scuttled by its crew after being incapacitated by the Japanese Navy, sank along with all 49 of its remaining crew, as it was being towed as a prize of war by the Japanese tugboat Sazanami. To prevent the ship from being taken, two members of the Russian crew locked themselves in the engine room, and opened the ship's Kingston valves to flood the ship.
- In Lenox, Massachusetts, high school junior Emily Hazel Crosby and four of her friends were injured in a sledding accident. Crosby died that night at the House of Mercy in Pittsfield, Massachusetts. The accident may have inspired the climax of the 1911 novella Ethan Frome by Lenox resident Edith Wharton.
- In Carbondale, Illinois, 25 men attempted unsuccessfully to remove Thomas Vaughan, an African American man accused of assaulting a schoolteacher, from jail in order to lynch him. The sheriff arrested four members of the mob, who were released on bail. Deputy Jack Woodward was accidentally wounded with his own gun during the attack. Josh Walker, one of the men arrested, was quoted as saying that "the intention was to get the negro out without bloodshed."
- Born:
  - David Kalākaua Kawānanakoa, member of the House of Kawānanakoa convicted of manslaughter, United States Coast Guardsman; in Honolulu, Oahu, Territory of Hawaii (d. 1953, heart attack)
  - Oran Pape, American National Football League running back and Iowa State Patrolman; in Waupeton, Iowa (d. 1936, murdered in line of duty)
  - Adalbert Schneider, German Kriegsmarine officer; in Halle (Saale), Province of Saxony, Kingdom of Prussia, German Empire (d. 1941 in sinking of German battleship Bismarck)
- Died:
  - Giovanni Cesari, 60, Italian castrato singer
  - George W. Croft, 57, Confederate States Army soldier, member of the United States House of Representatives from South Carolina, died from blood poisoning due to a splinter.

== March 11, 1904 (Friday) ==
- The cable layer (and former passenger liner) RMS Scotia was wrecked without loss of life on Gallallan Bank off Guam.
- In Burlington, Iowa, 52-year-old dairyman and milkman John Pierson disappeared. His body would be found in the Mississippi River on August 20, having been robbed and murdered. The case would never be solved.
- At about 11 p.m., a mob seized James Cummings, an African American man, from the Mojave, California, jail. The mob reportedly intended to tar and feather Cummings, but while kneeling with his hands raised he was shot in the head and killed. Testimony at the March 13 inquest would reveal that Cummings had been jailed due to an accusation of assault by a boy who then disappeared. There was absolutely no evidence that Cummings was guilty of any crime.
- Born:
  - Hilde Bruch, German-born American psychiatrist; in Dülken, Germany (d. 1984)
  - Harold F. Cherniss, American classicist and historian; in St. Joseph, Missouri (d. 1987)
  - Albrecht von Hagen, German jurist and Resistance fighter; in Langen, Province of Pomerania, Kingdom of Prussia, German Empire (d. 1944, execution by hanging)
  - Giulio Cesare Uccelini, leading figure in Catholic Scouting and the Italian resistance movement; in Milan, Kingdom of Italy (d. 1957, stomach tumor)
- Died:
  - Charles Grisart, 66, French opera composer
  - Sir Herbert Harley Murray KCB, 74, Scottish civil servant, Governor of Newfoundland

== March 12, 1904 (Saturday) ==
- Gifts to U.S. President Theodore Roosevelt and to Chicago's Lincoln Park Zoo, provided by King Menelik of Abyssinia (now Ethiopia), arrived at Boston harbor on the steamship Lowther Castle, with the White House receiving a baby lion named Joe, a hyena named bill, and "two magnificent elephant's tusks of the purest ivory." The zoo was given a menagerie "consisting of elephants, monkeys, tigers, pythons and Oriental birds."
- General Aleksey Kuropatkin, who had stepped down the month before as the Russian Minister of War to take command of the Imperial Russian Army in the war against Japan, was given an enthusiastic sendoff from the railway station at Saint Petersburg.
- Born:
  - Adolf Arndt, German politician, member of the Bundestag; in Königsberg, East Prussia, Kingdom of Prussia, German Empire (d. 1974)
  - Ivo Battelli, Italian architect and set decorator; in São Paulo, São Paulo, Brazil (d. 1970 or later)
  - Lyudmila Keldysh, Russian mathematician; in Orenburg, Russia (d. 1976)
  - Bodo Uhse, German writer, journalist and activist; in Rastatt, Grand Duchy of Baden, German Empire (d. 1963)
- Died: Oliver Harriman, 74, American businessman

== March 13, 1904 (Sunday) ==
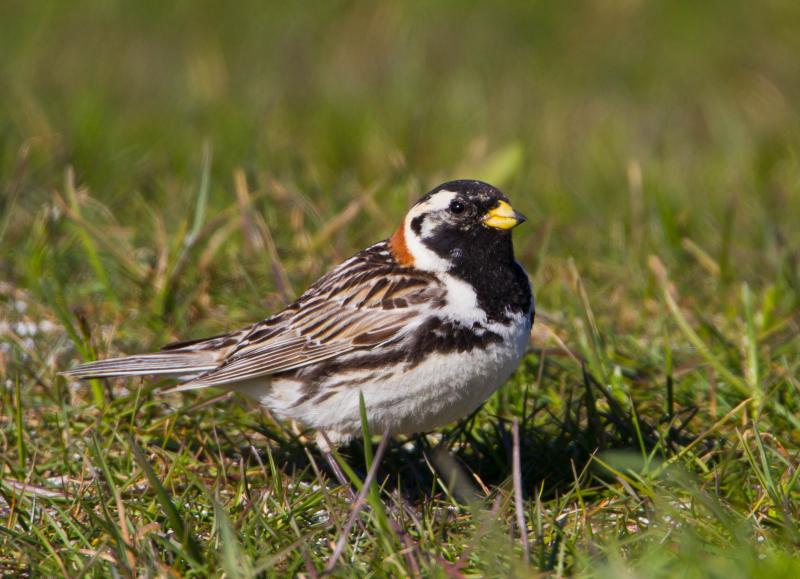
A Lapland longspur

- On the night of March 13–14, over 1.5 million Lapland longspurs migrating north died in a snowstorm in southwestern Minnesota and northwestern Iowa. According to naturalist John Kenneth Terres, this event was "the greatest natural destruction of birds in the history of this country" (the United States).
- Born:
  - Reidar Aulie, Norwegian artist; in Kristiania, Norway (d. 1977)
  - Harry Buckwitz, German actor and theatre director; in Munich, Bavaria, Germany (d. 1987)
  - René Dumont, French agronomist, sociologist and politician; in Cambrai, Nord, France (d. 2001)
  - August Heim, German Olympic fencer; in Offenbach am Main, Hessen, Germany (d. 1976)
  - Paul Mattick, German American Marxist political writer; in Stolp, Province of Pomerania, German Empire (d. 1981)
  - Clifford Roach, Trinidadian cricketer and footballer; in Port of Spain, Trinidad and Tobago (d. 1988)
  - Luciano Trolli, Italian Olympic breaststroke swimmer; in Como, Province of Como, Italy (d. 1973)
- Died:
  - Antonietta Cimolini, 26, Italian soprano and aeronaut, drowned after a water landing in a hot air balloon during a performance in Buenos Aires, Argentina.
  - Joachim Joseph André Murat, 75, French politician
  - Ludovic Trarieux, 63, former French Minister of Justice

== March 14, 1904 (Monday) ==
- The United States Supreme Court issued its ruling in the case of Northern Securities Co. v. United States, determining by a margin of 5 to 4 that the creation of the Northern Securities Company was illegal.
- Born:
  - Armas Äikiä, Finnish communist writer and journalist; in Pyhäjärvi, Karelia, Grand Duchy of Finland, Russian Empire (d. 1965)
  - Francisco Garza Gutiérrez, Mexican footballer; in Mexico City, Mexico (d. 1965)
  - Doris Eaton Travis (born Doris Eaton), American actress; in Norfolk, Virginia (d. 2010, aneurysm)
- Died: Straton Campbell, 80, English cricketer and clergyman

== March 15, 1904 (Tuesday) ==
- In Ling, East Austria, German rioters interrupted a performance by Czech violinist Jan Kubelík, throwing objects at him and forcing the concert to end. Further demonstrations necessitating police action took place outside Kubelík's hotel.
- In Budapest, Hungary, demonstrators stoned the palaces of Emperor Franz Joseph I of Austria and Archduchess Clotilde because the buildings were not decorated in honor of the anniversary of the Revolution of 1848.
- At least three people, two of whom were teenagers, were killed and eight injured in an explosion of toy pistol caps at the Chicago Toy Novelty Company manufacturing plant in Chicago, Illinois.
- Born:
  - Brunolf Baade, German aeronautical engineer; in Berlin-Rixdorf, German Empire (d. 1969, complications of stomach cancer)
  - Fritz Berendsen, German politician, member of the Bundestag; in Ratzeburg, Germany (d. 1974)
  - George Brent (born George Brendan Nolan), Irish American actor; in Ballinasloe, Ireland (d. 1979)
  - Artur Camolas, Portuguese footballer (deceased)
  - J. Pat O'Malley, English actor; in Burnley, Lancashire, England (d. 1985, cardiovascular disease)
- Died:
  - Mosè Bianchi, 63, Italian painter
  - Arthur White Greeley, 28, American physiologist and ichthyologist, died after an operation for appendicitis.
  - Pius Keller, OSA, 78, German Augustinian friar
  - Pavel Koshetz, 40, Russian operatic tenor, died by suicide.
  - Thomas Robert McInnes, 63, Canadian physician and politician, Lieutenant Governor of British Columbia, died of heart disease.

== March 16, 1904 (Wednesday) ==
- At the city prison in Seoul, Korea, thirteen prisoners were executed by strangling for complicity in the 1895 murder of Empress Myeongseong. 22 highwaymen were executed on the same occasion.
- An earthquake changed the courses of rivers and formed new lakes on the Pacific coast of Washington state.
- Born:
  - Marcel Ilpide, French racing cyclist; in Chasseradès, France (d. 1961)
  - Doreen Warriner, English development economist and rescuer of refugees; in Long Compton, Warwickshire, England (d. 1972, stroke)
- Died:
  - Thomas K. Fraser, 60, American businessman and politician
  - Gaetano Giorgio Gemmellaro, 72, Italian geologist, paleontologist and politician
  - Wilhelm Joachim von Hammerstein, 66, Prussian politician and newspaper editor

== March 17, 1904 (Thursday) ==
- An outbreak of bubonic plague began in the Indian quarter of Johannesburg, South Africa.
- A tornado caused severe damage and killed one person in the village of Neyland, Texas.
- In Chicago, Illinois, General Frederick Dent Grant, attending the St. Patrick's Day banquet of the Irish Fellowship Club as the main guest, reportedly shocked society members by declining to respond to a toast to U.S. President Theodore Roosevelt, saying, "I do not know the President of the United States."
- Born:
  - Patrick Hamilton (born Anthony Walter Patrick Hamilton), English playwright and novelist; in Hassocks, Sussex, England (d. 1962, cirrhosis and kidney failure)
  - Granville West, Baron Granville-West (born Daniel Granville West), British politician; in Newbridge, Wales (d. 1984)
- Died:
  - Louis Mary Fink, O.S.B., 69, German-born American Roman Catholic prelate, Bishop of Leavenworth, died of pneumonia.
  - Prince George, Duke of Cambridge, 84, grandson of King George III, died of a stomach haemorrhage.
  - Gideon C. Moody, 71, American attorney and politician, member of the United States Senate from South Dakota
  - William Elbridge Sewell, 52, American naval officer, Governor of Guam, died of a liver abscess.
  - Horace Holmes Thomas, 72, American lawyer and Union Army officer, member of the Illinois General Assembly
  - Henry T. Thurber, 49, American attorney, Private Secretary to the White House during U.S. President Grover Cleveland's second term, died after an operation for appendicitis.

== March 18, 1904 (Friday) ==
- The Ancient Monuments Preservation Act was passed in British India.
- Two bombs exploded at Odessa University, and nine unexploded bombs were discovered. Two students were subsequently arrested.
- In Liège, Belgium, a bomb exploded outside the residence of the Commissioner of Police, killing a Belgian Army artillery officer who was examining it and seriously injuring six other people. An anarchist was believed to be responsible.

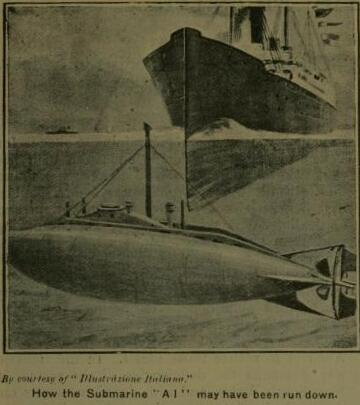
1904 artist's rendering of the collision of Berwick Castle with A1

- The Royal Navy submarine HMS A1 sank with all hands during a training exercise off the Isle of Wight while making a mock attack on the protected cruiser HMS Juno. A1 was struck by SS Berwick Castle, the master of which was unaware that there were submarines in the area.
- The New Orleans French Opera Company disbanded while on tour in New York City. The company's members had refused to perform the previous night because their salaries were overdue.
- By a vote of 45 to 16, the United States Senate confirmed President Roosevelt's August 8, 1903, promotion of U.S. Army General Leonard Wood to the rank of major general.
- General Frederick Dent Grant criticized the newspaper coverage of his remarks at the previous day's Irish Fellowship Club banquet, claiming that he had said he "did not know anything about the Presidency" and that "Presidency and President are distinct terms".
- In Cleveland, Mississippi, a masked lynch mob seized Fayette Sawyer and Burke Parris, African Americans charged with the murder of an African American porter, from jail and hanged them from a railroad bridge.
- Born:
  - Srečko Kosovel, Slovenian poet; in Sežana, Princely County of Gorizia and Gradisca, Austria-Hungary (d. 1926, meningitis)
  - Alfredo Poviña, Argentine sociologist; in San Miguel de Tucumán, Argentina (d. 1986)
  - Kōjirō Yoshikawa, Japanese sinologist; in Kobe, Japan (d. 1980)
- Died:
  - Allen P. Lovejoy, 78, American politician and businessman
  - Regine Olsen (married name Regine Schlegel), 82, Danish woman, former fiancée of Søren Kierkegaard
  - Henry Saunders, 62, English first-class cricketer and businessman
  - David Watson Stevenson, 61, Scottish sculptor

== March 19, 1904 (Saturday) ==
- A fire at the Laxey Mine in Laxey, Isle of Man, did not result in any casualties.
- In Buffalo, New York, U.S. Army Major Theodore A. Bingham was supervising the hoisting of a harbor launch when a falling derrick broke both of his legs. One of Bingham's legs would be amputated on May 20.
- Architect Alfred Gutbur, the last Russian World's Fair official remaining in St. Louis, departed for Saint Petersburg.
- Born:
  - Iris Adami Corradetti, Italian opera soprano and singing teacher; in Milan, Italy (d. 1998)
  - Tadeusz Kassern, Polish composer; in Lviv, Ukraine (d. 1957, cancer)
  - Eleanor Schill, English physician and psychiatrist; in Manchester, England (d. 2005)
  - John Sirica, United States federal judge; in Waterbury, Connecticut (d. 1992, cardiac arrest)
- Died: Oliver Duff Greene, 71, Union Army officer, recipient of the Medal of Honor, died of heart failure.

== March 20, 1904 (Sunday) ==
- At 1:04 a.m., an earthquake was felt throughout eastern New England, from Saint John, New Brunswick, to Taunton, Massachusetts, causing slight damage.
- Harvard University celebrated the 70th birthday of its President, Charles William Eliot, who was presented with a loving cup at University Hall.
- A major flood began on the Grand River in Michigan, believed to be the largest in the river's recorded history. It would continue through April 8, causing extensive damage.
- Mexican bullfighter "Cuckoo" was fatally gored by a dying bull in the arena at Juarez.
- Born:
  - Lady Alexandra Curzon, English noblewoman and charity administrator (d. 1995)
  - Walter M. Elsasser, German-born American physicist; in Mannheim, Germany (d. 1991)
  - Robert Marichal, French palaeographer and archivist; in Mandres, France (d. 1999)
  - B. F. Skinner, American behavioral psychologist; in Susquehanna Depot, Pennsylvania (d. 1990, complications from leukemia)
- Died:
  - Frank B. Fay, 83, American businessman and politician
  - Charles Winston Thompson, 43, American banker and politician, member of the United States House of Representatives from Alabama, died of pneumonia.

== March 21, 1904 (Monday) ==
- Admiral Tōgō's fleet bombarded Port Arthur intermittently from midnight until 11 a.m.
- In Samung, north of Gensan (now Wonsan), Korea, Japanese forces suppressed a Korean uprising, killing five Koreans and wounding 25.
- On a houseboat on the White River in St. Charles, Arkansas, Jim Searcy, a white man, and two African American brothers, Henry and Walker Griffin, argued over a game of chance. One of the Griffin brothers struck Searcy. Upon arresting Griffin for assault, a police officer told him that he would be hanged. Griffin struck the officer and fled with his service weapon. The hunt for Griffin would result in the series of events known as the St. Charles Lynching of 1904.
- A tornado and hailstorm caused severe damage in Higginsville, Missouri, and two other neighboring towns.

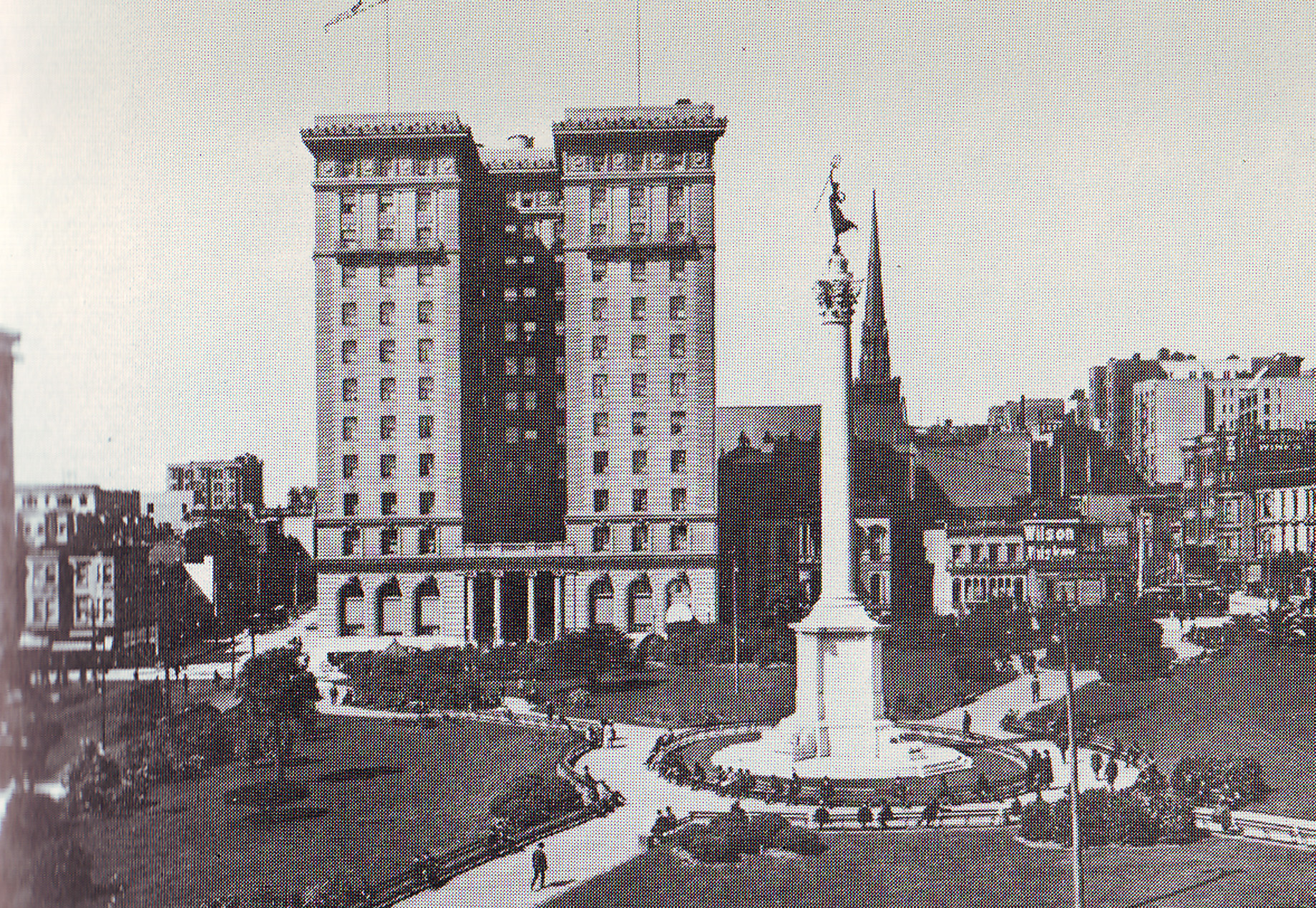
The St. Francis Hotel shortly after its opening

- The St. Francis Hotel (now the Westin St. Francis) opened on Union Square, San Francisco, California.
- The tone poem Symphonia Domestica by Richard Strauss received its world premiere at Carnegie Hall in New York City, conducted by the composer.
- Born:
  - Fedir Abramov, Ukrainian geologist and mining specialist; in Lysychansk, the Donbas, Ukraine (d. 1982)
  - Jehane Benoît, Canadian author and journalist; in Montreal, Quebec, Canada (d. 1987)
  - Edward Cronjager, American cinematographer; in New York City, New York (d. 1960)
  - Karl Leonhard, German psychiatrist; in Edelsfeld, Bavaria, German Empire (d. 1988)
  - Forrest Mars Sr., American businessman, inventor of M&M's; in Wadena, Minnesota (d. 1999)
  - Bernard Schmetz, French Olympic champion fencer; in Orléans, Loiret, France (d. 1966)
  - Nikos Skalkottas, Greek violinist and composer; in Chalcis, Euboea, Greece (d. 1949, ruptured hernia)
  - Max Steenbeck, German physicist; in Kiel, Germany (d. 1981)
- Died:
  - Aurélie Ghika (born Henriette Aurélie Soubiran), 83, French writer
  - William Russell Grace, 71, Irish American politician and businessman, former Mayor of New York City, died of pneumonia.

== March 22, 1904 (Tuesday) ==
- In Liège, Belgium, a presumed anarchist bomb on the windowsill of Police Commissioner Binet's residence was discovered before it could do any damage.
- The Wright brothers applied for a French patent on the Wright Flyer. They would apply for a German patent on March 24.
- Stanford University athlete Norman E. Dole set an unofficial world record of 12 feet 0.75 inches (3.6767 m) in the pole vault. The record could not be officially accepted because it was not set in open competition.
- Born:
  - Jack Z. Anderson, American farmer and politician, member of the United States House of Representatives from California; in Oakland, California (d. 1981)
  - Itche Goldberg, Polish-born American Yiddish-language author; in Opatów, Poland (d. 2006)
- Died:
  - William Stephen Coleman, 74–75, English painter and book illustrator
  - James H. Jones, 73, American lawyer and politician, Confederate States Army officer, member of the United States House of Representatives from Texas
  - Art McCoy, 39, American Major League Baseball second baseman
  - Thomas A. Morris, 92, Union Army general, railroad executive and civil engineer
  - Karl Moritz Schumann, 52, German botanist

== March 23, 1904 (Wednesday) ==
- At Philharmonic Hall, Liverpool, E. D. Morel's Congo Reform Association held its first meeting.
- In St. Charles, Arkansas, white men on horseback rode through the countryside accosting African Americans in response to the incident between Jim Searcy and the Griffin brothers on March 21. A posse led by Deputy Sheriff P. A. Douglass shot and killed three African American men — Will Baldwin, Randall Flood and Will Madison — after they refused to provide information about the Griffins' location. Between 60 and 70 African Americans, including men, women and children, were imprisoned in a St. Charles warehouse surrounded by white mobs who threatened to burn the warehouse down with the prisoners inside. A white witness later stated that the mob "wanted to exterminate the negro race."
- Born:
  - Mosher Joseph Blumenfeld, United States federal judge; in Saint Paul, Minnesota (d. 1988)
  - Joan Crawford (born Lucille Fay LeSueur), American actress; in San Antonio, Texas (d. 1977, coronary arrest). (Other sources report her year of birth as 1905, 1906, or 1908.)

== March 24, 1904 (Thursday) ==
- In St. Charles, Arkansas, five African American men were removed from the group of prisoners in the warehouse and arrested on charges of defiance toward the white officers. The five men — Abe Bailey, Mack Baldwin, Garrett Flood and Charlie and Jim Smith — were subsequently lined up and shot to death by about 50 white men. The same morning, several white men shot and killed African American Aaron Hinton, who had fired into a posse.
- Born:
  - Hans Ertel, German natural scientist; in Berlin, German Empire (d. 1971)
  - Pamplona (born Estanislau de Figueiredo Pamplona), Brazilian footballer; in Belém, Pará, Brazil (d. 1973)
- Died:
  - Sir Edwin Arnold KCIE CSI, 71, English poet and journalist
  - Emma Herwegh (born Emma Siegmund), 86, German writer

== March 25, 1904 (Friday) ==
- The opera Armida, the final work of Czech composer Antonín Dvořák, received its world premiere at the National Theatre in Prague. Dvořák, dissatisfied with the production, left the performance early due to kidney pain.
- A serious flood began on the Mohawk River in New York; it would continue through March 31.
- In St. Charles, Arkansas, African American Perry Carter was found dead in the woods.
- Born:
  - Ivanhoe Gambini, Italian architect and painter; in Busto Arsizio, Province of Varese, Italy (d. 1992)
  - Johann Baptist Gradl, German politician, member of the Bundestag; in Berlin, Germany (d. 1988)
  - Pete Johnson (born Kermit H. Johnson), American boogie-woogie and jazz pianist; in Kansas City, Missouri (d. 1967)
- Died: Charles R. Johnson, 73–74, American merchant, died of apoplexy.

== March 26, 1904 (Saturday) ==
- Composer Antonín Dvořák's physician recommended peace and quiet at home for his illness.
- In Hyde Park, London, 20,000 demonstrators gathered to protest against the importation of Chinese labourers to South Africa by the British government.

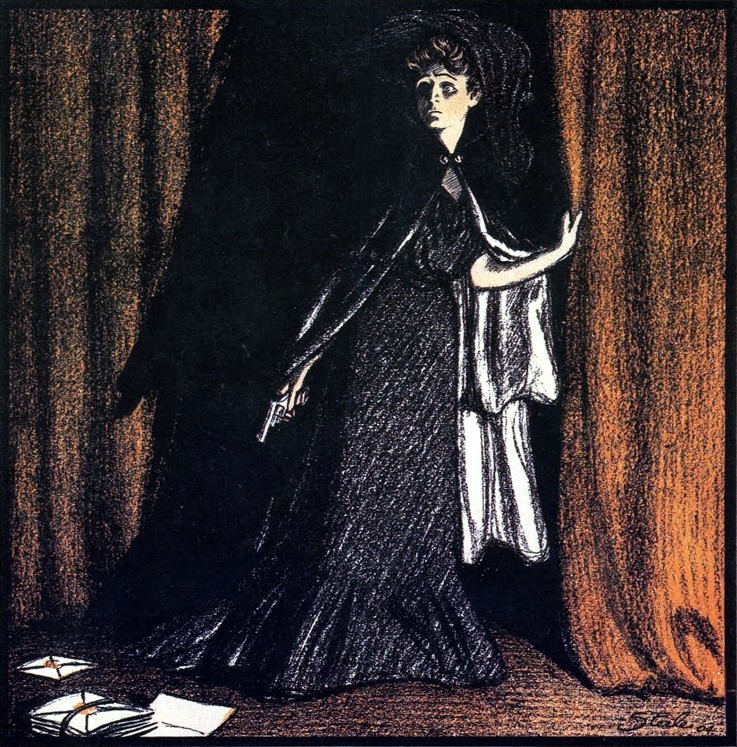
An unexpected killer in "The Adventure of Charles Augustus Milverton"

- The Sherlock Holmes short story "The Adventure of Charles Augustus Milverton" by Sir Arthur Conan Doyle was published for the first time in Collier's in the United States.
- In St. Charles, Arkansas, African American Kellis Johnson and the brothers Henry and Walker Griffin, who had quarreled with Jim Searcy on March 21, were murdered. This concluded the massacre with a total death toll of 13, all African American men.
- Born:
  - Gustave Biéler, French-born Canadian hero of World War II; in Beurlay, France (d. 1944, executed by firing squad)
  - Joseph Campbell, American author on mythology; in White Plains, New York (d. 1987, complications of esophageal cancer)
  - Emilio Fernández, Mexican film director, actor and screenwriter; in Sabinas, Coahuila, Mexico (d. 1986)
  - Attilio Ferraris, Italian Olympic and professional footballer; in Rome, Italy (d. 1947 during match)
  - Leck Fischer (born Otto Peter Leck Fischer), Danish writer and playwright; in Copenhagen, Denmark (d. 1956)
  - Wilhelm Fischer, German politician, member of the Bundestag; in Fürth, Bavaria, German Empire (d. 1951)
  - Sigmund Frogn, Norwegian footballer; in Kristiania, Norway (d. 1990)
  - Hugon Hanke, Polish politician, Prime Minister of the Republic of Poland in Exile; in Siemianowice, Poland (d. 1964)
  - Corrado Mancioli, Italian painter; in Rome, Italy (d. 1968)
  - Xanti Schawinsky (born Alexander Schawinsky), Swiss American painter, photographer and theater designer; in Basel, Switzerland (d. 1979)
  - Hermann Schroeder, German composer; in Bernkastel, German Empire (d. 1984)
- Died:
  - Dan Daly, 40, American comedian, died of a pulmonary hemorrhage due to tuberculosis, two weeks after the death of his wife.
  - Giuseppe Marconi, 83, Italian landowner, father of Guglielmo Marconi
  - Ferdinand Pauwels, 73, Belgian history painter

== March 27, 1904 (Sunday) ==
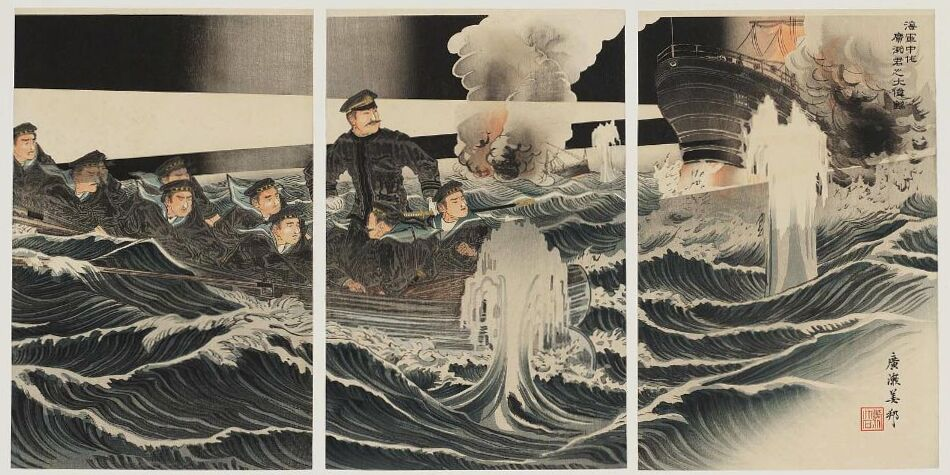
Commander Hirose's Great Achievement by Hirose Yoshikuni

- Japanese forces failed to block the channel at Port Arthur by sinking merchant steamships when Russian forces disabled four vessels before they could reach the entrance to the harbor.
- Russian authorities imposed martial law in Niuzhuang.
- The Lord Curzon of Kedleston, Viceroy of India, was appointed Lord Warden of the Cinque Ports.
- In New Haven, Connecticut, nearly 20 people were injured, eight of them seriously, in a human crush caused by a false shout of fire during a morning service at St. Michael's Italian Church.
- In Quincy, Illinois, a fire at the Hotel Newcomb caused the deaths of two guests, one of whom jumped from a third-story window.
- In Beaumont, Texas, Frederick Hoppert, a white lumber mill watchman, was shot and killed, reportedly as part of an ongoing labor and racial conflict that had already included the lynching of John Maynard, an African American man, in Montgomery, Texas, for the robbery and murder of Martin Surovak, a white lumberman.
- Born: Danilo Innocenti, Italian Olympic pole vaulter; in Sesto Fiorentino, Province of Florence, Italy (d. 1949)
- Died:
  - Hirose Takeo, 35, Imperial Japanese Navy officer, was killed in action at Port Arthur.
  - Thomas O. Osborn, 71, American lawyer, Union Army general and United States Minister to Argentina, died of apoplexy.
  - Édouard Richard, 60, Canadian historian and politician

== March 28, 1904 (Monday) ==
- In Chongju, Korea, a land engagement resulted in three Russian deaths, five Japanese deaths and a retreat by Russian troops.
- Thomas Daly, a brother of comedian Dan Daly, who had died on March 26, died in Revere, Massachusetts. Thomas' death was the fifth in nine weeks in the Daly acting family.
- As part of the ongoing racial conflict in East Texas, African Americans Bob Childress and George Odum reportedly shot and killed white lumberman Tobe McKinney at Hooks station. Childress was wounded in a retaliatory attack and arrested, but Odum escaped. That night in Silsbee, Texas, Henry Bullock, a white man, was reportedly shot and killed, and two other white men seriously wounded, in an ambush by a group of African Americans.
- Born:
  - Day Keene (pseudonym for Gunnar Hjerstedt), American novelist, short story writer and radio and television scriptwriter; in Chicago, Illinois (d. 1969)
  - V. Nagayya (born Vuppaladadiyam Nagayya Sarma), Indian actor, director and producer; in Repalle, Madras Presidency, British India (d. 1973)
  - Hjalmar Nyström, Finnish Olympic wrestler; in Helsinki, Grand Duchy of Finland, Russian Empire (d. 1960)
  - Margaret Tucker (born Margaret Clements), Aboriginal Australian activist and writer; at Warrangesda Mission, near Narrandera, New South Wales, Australia (d. 1996)
- Died:
  - E. W. Cave, 72, American newspaper editor, Secretary of State of Texas, died of injuries caused by a fall from a streetcar.
  - John Alfred Wilson, 70, Union Army soldier and Andrews' Raider, one of the inaugural recipients of the Medal of Honor

== March 29, 1904 (Tuesday) ==
- The office of the Viceroy of British India reported that the number of deaths in India from bubonic plague had increased by more than 20 percent in the most recent reports, with 40,327 dead in a seven day period from March 13 to March 19, an increase of 7,000 from almost 33,000 deaths in the previous seven days.
- Born:
  - Jacques Canthelou, French Olympic and professional footballer; in Elbeuf, Seine-Inférieure, France (d. 1973)
  - Anibal José, Portuguese Olympic and professional footballer; in Setúbal, Portugal (d. 1976)
- Died:
  - F. W. Cox, 87, English-born Australian Congregationalist minister and numismatist
  - Burton Harrison, 65, American lawyer and politician, private secretary to Jefferson Davis
  - Frank E. Manson, American sailor, survivor of the Jeannette expedition
  - William H. F. Payne, 74, Confederate States Army brigadier general

== March 30, 1904 (Wednesday) ==
- Composer Antonín Dvořák caught a chill while taking a walk at the Vinohrady train station in Prague.
- Born:
  - Akarova (born Marguerite Acarin), Belgian dance artist; in Saint-Josse-ten-Noode, Brussels, Belgium (d. 1999)
  - Alexandrina of Balazar (born Alexandrina Maria da Costa), Portuguese Roman Catholic mystic, victim soul and blessed; in Balazar, Póvoa de Varzim, Portugal (d. 1955)
  - Ripper Collins (born James Anthony Collins), American Major League Baseball first baseman; in Altoona, Pennsylvania (d. 1970, heart attack)
  - Edgar P. Jacobs (born Edgard Félix Pierre Jacobs), Belgian comic book creator; in Brussels, Belgium (d. 1987)
  - Shin Matsushita, Japanese supercentenarian (d. 2019)
  - Pietro Scapinelli di Leguigno, Italian soldier and test pilot; in Vicenza, Italy (d. 1941, plane crash)
  - Wilfred White, English Olympic champion equestrian; in Bickerton, Cheshire East, Cheshire, England (d. 1995)
- Died: Frank A. Cady, 45, American lawyer and businessman, member of the Wisconsin State Assembly, committed suicide by jumping from the third-floor veranda of a hotel in Hot Springs, Arkansas.

== March 31, 1904 (Thursday) ==
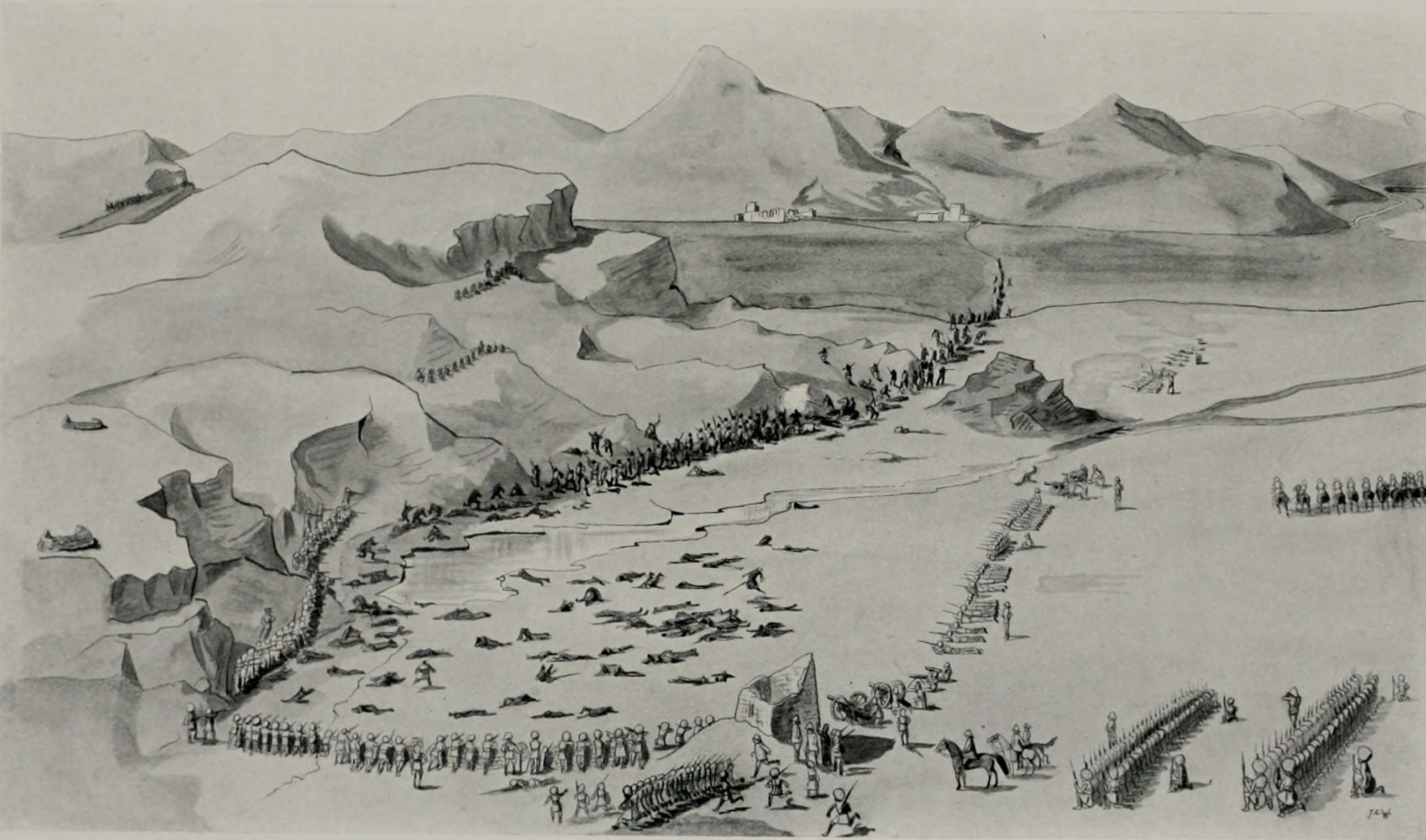
Diagram of Chumik Shenko massacre

- At the Battle of Guru (also known as the Massacre of Chumik Shenko), 1,000 troops of the British expedition to Tibet under Colonel Francis Younghusband defeated up to 2,000 ill-equipped Tibetan troops, killing 600.
- The Treaty of Sofia was signed between the Principality of Bulgaria and the Kingdom of Serbia.
- Antonín Dvořák resumed bed rest. He would die on May 1.
- French driver Louis Rigolly set a new world land speed record of 95.401 miles per hour (153.533 km/h), driving a Gobron-Brillié racing car in Nice, France.
- English music hall performer Little Tich married Spanish-born dancer Julia Recio at the St Giles, London, Register Office.
- Born:
  - Đorđe Andrejević-Kun, Serbian painter and academic; in Breslau, Germany (d. 1964)
  - Harald Berglund, Swedish cinematographer; in Stockholm, Sweden (d. 1980)
  - Aracy Cortes (born Zilda de Carvalho Espíndola), Brazilian singer, dancer and actress (d. 1985)
  - Sam Dailey, American Major League Baseball pitcher; in Oakford, Illinois (d. 1979)
  - Lindsay C. Howard, American sportsman; in San Francisco, California (d. 1971)
  - István Kossa, Hungarian politician, Minister of Finance; in Balatonlelle, Austria-Hungary (d. 1965)
  - Gustav Kristiansen, Norwegian Olympic cyclist; in Oslo, Norway (d. 1988)
  - Federico Norcia, Italian chess master; in Lugo di Romagna, Italy (d. 1985)
  - Red Rollings (born William Russell Rollings), American Major League Baseball reserve infielder; in Mobile, Alabama (d. 1964)
  - Royce H. Savage, United States district judge of the United States District Court for the Northern District of Oklahoma; in Blanco, Indian Territory (d. 1993)
  - Ichiji Sugita, Imperial Japanese Army and Japan Ground Self-Defense Force officer (d. 1993)
  - Tatsuo Toki, Japanese Olympic decathlete; in Nakagawa, Tokushima, Japan (d. 1967, cancer)
  - Emmanuel Véry-Hermence, French socialist politician; in Sainte-Marie, Martinique (d. 1966)
- Died:
  - Gerard Francis Cobb, 65, English Anglican musician, Junior Bursar of Trinity College, Cambridge
  - William Dick, 82, Canadian lumber merchant and politician
  - Valentine Blake Dillon, 58–59, Irish politician, Lord Mayor of Dublin
  - André Hennebicq, 68, Belgian painter
  - Sophia Karp (born Sara Segal), 42–43, Romanian-born actress and soprano, died of pneumonia.
  - Nathan Menderson, 83, German-born American businessman and baseball executive
  - Matthew Teed, 75, English-born American carpenter and politician, member of the Los Angeles Common Council
  - Alson Wood, 76, American businessman and politician
