= Emma Hellenstainer =

Austrian pioneer (1818–1904)

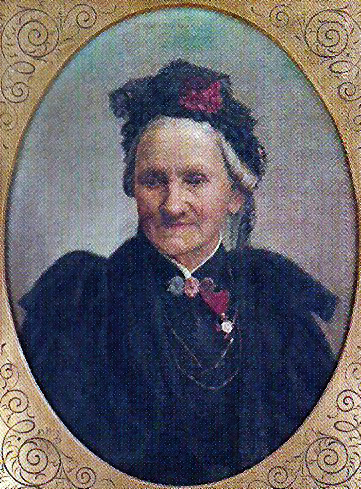
- 1895
- Born: Emerentiana Hausbacher; 23 April 1818; St. Johann, Tyrol, Austrian empire
- Died: 9 March 1904 (aged 86); Meran(o), Tyrol, Austrian empire
- Occupations: Businesswoman; Tourism Pioneer; Restauranteuse; Bremery manager Hotelier
- Spouse: Joseph Carl Hellensteiner (1809-1858)
- Children: 7
- Parents: Johann Hausbacher (1776-1838) (father); Maria Panzl (1783-1866) (mother)

Emma Hellenstainer (sometimes Emma Hellensteiner or simply Frau Emma: born Emerentiana Hausbacher: 23 April 1818 - 9 March 1904) was a pioneer of Tirolean Gastronomy. She exhibited formidable talents, both as a businesswoman and in terms of what, during the twentieth century, would have become widely understood as marketing.

== Biography ==
=== Provenance and early years ===
Emerentiana Hausbacher was born at St. Johann in Tirol during the economically troubled aftermath of the Napoleonic Wars. Both of her parents were ambitious and energetic. Johann Hausbacher, her father, is described variously as a tanner, a war commissary ("Marschkommissär"), a businessman and a retail grocer (or general stores keeper). Of more significance in terms of her own later career choice may have been her mother's work. Maria Hausbacher (born Maria Panzl) took over the running of the "Gasthaus zum grauen Bären" ("Grey Bear Guest House"), a popular restaurant in the main square at St. Johann, when Emma was fifteen. In 1832, Johann and Maria Hausbacher purchased the establishment. After Johann Hausbacher's death in 1838, his widow stayed on as the landlady.

=== Schooling and apprenticeship ===
Emma started working in the restaurant at early age, serving the customers at their tables: this hands-on apprenticeship was interrupted when she was sent away to Innsbruck where she received from the Ursuline sisters a basic training in household management (which in this case included embroidery) and her first lessons in Italian. After that she was sent to Salzburg in order to master cookery and catering at the "Drei Allierten Hotel" ("Three Allies Hotel"). (Note: The reference in the hotel's name to "three allies" is to the Russian, Austrian and Prussian armies that had eventually put an end to what had been seen, from the Austro-Hungarian perspective, as the Napoleonic nightmare. The hotel had recently been purchased from Georg and Therese Nelböck by a businessman from Alsace: it is still identified in some sources as the "Hotel Nelböck". The change in ownership had been followed in 1829, marked by a determination to make the "Drei Allierten Hotel" one of the best such establishments in the city.) While still working her apprenticeship in Salzburg, Emerentiana Hausbacher found time to write her first book: it was, perhaps inevitably, a book of recipes. It is clear that Maria Hausbacher had a very clear career plan for her daughter, which at this stage involved taking over at the "Grauen Bären" in St. Johann. These plans changed, however, when Maria Hausbacher, unexpectedly acquired - in place of a substantial and otherwise irrecoverable debt - the brewery on the banks of the fast-flowing Rienz at Toblach (as Dobbiaco was known at that time). Johann Hausbacher had been gravely ill for some years before he died: Emma's mother already had more competing business responsibilities with which to cope than she could easily manage in St. Johann, even before she was widowed.

=== Toblach/Dobbiaco and brewery ===
The brewery at Toblach represented both a challenge and a major opportunity. Emma's elder sister, Anna Hausbacher, would take over the running of the "Grauen Bären" on 1841. Meanwhile, still aged 20, accompanied by her childhood nurse, and pursued by helpful advice from her concerned mother including, memorably, "lachen darfst du nie" ("you should never smile"), Emerentiana Hausbacher moved in at Toblach. Armed with considerable experience of her mother's restaurant business and what was by now an extensive training in management and hospitality, Emma Hausbacher was able take charge of the brewing business in Toblach without apparent difficulty. (Note: Although the entire South Tyrol region became part of Italy in 1919, there was no reason to believe at any point during Emma Hellenstainer's life time that it would ever be anything other than Austrian. When she first moved to Toblach, located at the point where the Rienz joins the Puster Valley, it really was not unreasonable to describe Italy as a "[mere] geographical expression": Metternich, the Austrian chancellor (government leader) till 1848, often did.)

=== Marriage and a return to hotel management ===
On 19 April 1842, soon after moving to the South Tyrol, Emerentiana Hausbacher married Joseph Carl Hellensteiner from Niederdorf (Villabassa in Italian-language sources), a village just over an hour's walk to the west of Hausbacher's recently acquired brewing business at Toblach. Hellensteiner was the son of the Niederdorf postmaster. He had also recently inherited, from an uncle, the "Schwarzadler" ("Black Eagle") guest house and of the Pragser Wildsee, a spectacularly sited small lake in the mountains a short distance to the south of the main valley. After a brief engagement, with the permission of the pastor at Toblach, the couple drove over to St. Johann. Here the wedding service was conducted by Johann Hausbacher, the assistant pastor from nearby Zell am Ziller, who was also the bride's brother. The marriage would be followed, between 1844 and 1856, by the births to the couple of at least five daughters and two sons. Following the wedding, and after securing her mother's agreement, Emma Hellensteiner oversaw the sale of the brewery at Toblach in order to concentrate, with her husband, on the "Schwarzadler" guest house in the next village.

=== Hotel hostess ===
The commercial potential of the guesthouse had been greatly enhanced through the opening in 1833 of the Strada d'Alemagna (Road to Germany), now an imperial route linking Venice and the Mediterranean to Cortina and Toblach. Toblach was an important road junction (and from 1871 also the location an important railway station) where travellers could either turn east towards Vienna or west towards Brenner and the main route from Milan to Augsburg and the western German heartland beyond. The times were also propitious. The long period of economic stagnation that had followed a quarter century of warfare had given way to several years of cautious expansion. In Lombardy to the south and in Austria to the north, tentative industrialisation was leading to the expansion of a middle class which would accelerate through the nineteenth century, increasing the number of people with time and money for travel, whether for business or on vacation. Europe's first tourism boom was about to take hold in Austria. Joseph and Emma Hellensteiner were among the first alpine guest-house proprietors to improve quality and raise prices to levels closer to those being charged in the cities. Typical guests at had hitherto been carriers, merchants and others stopping off en route to other places; but increasingly, by the middle of the nineteenth century, the "Schwarzadler", perfectly located in the main square at Niederdorf/Villabassa was also welcoming tourists. Following the creation of an "imperial route" through the little town, a customs office had also been erected in the town square, close to the hotel, further increasing the number and diversity of well-funded guests for the hotel and its restaurant. "Frau Emma" (as she was becoming known) grabbed at the opportunity to move upmarket, building up from the basic Puster Valley cuisine to a broadened range of dining options, introducing the consistently high standards of the "Biedermeier Cuisine" about which she had learned during her apprenticeship in Salzburg. She also replaced the furniture and fittings in the rooms, raising the quality of the overall offering. If Emma Hellensteiner is remembered today for her reputation as a tourism pioneer, both for her insistence on raising standards and for her personality and the charm with which she unfailingly greeted and looked after the guests, that reputation was based in the first instance on the real-world experience of the hotel guests. (She was by this time completely bilingual in German and Italian.) Hotel guests - especially those motivated by tourism - ere appreciative of the trouble she took when making suggestions as to which way they should walk to find the most scenic routes, the bluest lake, the largest area of open meadow on which to sit and rest, or indeed where to go if they wished to pray in the little church with the best renaissance frescoes: accessing the little "Mooskirche", a fifteen minute stroll from the hotel, built and adorned with frescoes by Paolina Gonzaga, the gifted daughter of Ludovico III of Mantua by his marriage to Barbara of Brandenburg, involved walking past a stretch of uninvitingly marshy ground and would have been almost impossible to find without the detailed directions which "Frau Emma" patiently provided. Every guest was put at ease and made to feel important: each was made to feel at home. Sources insist that Emma Hellenstainer really was the perfect hotel proprietress and hostess.

Despite all this, she undoubtedly also had a rare awareness of the importance of publicity. She is frequently cited as the first hotelier to advertise in the international press. The anecdote concerning a postcard sent by a hotel guest from America, correctly delivered despite being addressed simply to "Frau Emma in Europa, Autriche", acquired a momentum of its own which contributed further to her fame.

As the local economy continued to prosper through the 1840s and 1850s, Joseph Hellenstainer, as the local postmaster, concentrated increasingly on "external matters", which meant addressing the growing need for transport services along the valley. He operated a scheduled carriage service connecting Brixen/Bressanone to Lienz, which naturally also served Niederdorf/Villabassa, Toblach/Dobbiaco and the other intervening towns and villages. The associated parcels delivery service was also booming. Emma was left at the "Schwarzadler" to focus on "internal matters" (and the couple's growing family), concentrating not just on the guests, but also on organisation of the staffing, catering and the wine cellar, the management of the garden and - perhaps even more important - of the hotel's extensive vegetable garden and dedicated farm.

=== Widow ===
On 14 May 1858, Joseph Hellensteiner died unexpectedly after seventeen years of marriage: it was determined that he had died from kidney failure. The sudden bereavement, at a time when even the eldest of their children were barely teenagers, was a major shock. Between 1858 and her formal retirement 1887 Emma Hellenstainer took charge of the family businesses on her own, supported increasingly as they grew older by the children. In addition to the various business activities directly associated with the hotel, she now also took charge of the thriving postbus business that her husband had built up.

After the death of her husband Emma Hellenstainer, already a tourism pioneer as a producer of tourism services, also became something of a tourism pioneer as a consumer. She was able to take a succession of day trips away from home for some combination of pleasure, intellectual curiosity and in pursuit of a cure from certain ill-defined but evidently persistent maladies. Around this time a number of fresh water springs that were believed, in their immediate localities, to confer certain health benefits, were beginning to attract visitors from neighbouring. Hellenstainer "took the waters" at a number of springs that, following her visits, almost instantly became known as little "health spas", such as the "deer spring" at nearby Prags/Braies, the "Weiherbad" and "Maistatt" springs on the edge of Niederdorf/Villabassa itself, the "Waldbrunn" spring at Welsberg/ Monguelfo and the "Salmon spring" at Antholz/Anterselva. There was clearly also a commercial motive for these well publicised trips. All the health-giving water springs in question were close enough to Niederdorf/Villabassa to be featured in a leisurely day trip from the "Schwarzadler". Those who were persuaded by the publicity to make their own visits to the little health spas in or close to the Puster Valley included not a few high-profile musicians, writers and painters. Even one or two "crowned heads" were moved to visit the valley, whether for the available health benefits or for the simple delight - enhanced by the fine hospitality of the "Schwarzadler" - to be found from the mountain ambience.

As the tourism boom accelerated and "Frau Emma's" reputation continued to grow, some of the empire's most socially exalted Vienna-based aristocrats stopped off at the "Schwarzadler", including the Count Esterházy, the popular Empress "Sissi" and her nephew, the emperor's heir (after his father's death in 1896), known in English language sources as the Archduke Ferdinand (1863-1914). All the visitors, whether from the top shelf of society or not, endured a long uncomfortable journey in order to enjoy the spectacular Dolomites landscape and the obligatory stop at the "Schwarzadler" in Niederdorf/Villabassa. The former guest house was transformed into one of the best-known hotels in Europe, and "Frau Emma" became one of the most famous hoteliers in (and far beyond) the Tyrol.

=== Mountain activities ===
She also organised walks and more demanding excursions into the mountains. She motivated and urged on young climbers. Her reputation, and that of the steep sided deep pink mountains of the region, had by now spread so far that these were arriving in increasing numbers, not just from other parts of Austria, but also from England and Ireland. These were some of the nineteenth century pioneers of mountaineering. These were the years during which the summits of the High Puster valley were identified and "conquered". Monte Pelmo is believed to have been the first significant Dolomite peak to be scaled. The mountaineer who achieved the feat, on 19 September 1857, was the Irishman John Ball (1818-1889). Then it was the turn of the Austrians Viktor Wolf von Glanvell (1871-1905) from Klagenfurt and Paul Grohmann (1838-1908) from Vienna. Grohmann conquered in rapid succession some of the largest of the Dolomite peaks. Emma Hellenstainer became convinced that she had spotted the early stages of another trend, and in 1869 she reacted by becoming the first female member of the Munich-based Deutscher Alpenverein, ("German Alpine Club"/ DAV) which had been established a few months earlier (with a constitution which stipulated than only men should be allowed to join). She subsequently co-founded a local High Puster valley branch of the DAV. In order to underwrite this new trend on behalf of her business and its customers, Hellenstainer head-hunted the noted Alpine guide, Josef Appenbichler: she persuaded him to leave his position with the Hotel Schneiderhof at Prags/Braies and to relocate the short distance to Niederdorf/Villabassa. Guests of the "Schwarzadler" could climb the mountains in safety.

=== Continuing tourism boom ===
17 November 1871 marked a turning point for the valley, thanks to the opening by the Austrian Southern Railway Company, of the railway connecting Franzensfeste/ Fortezza, some distance to the west of Niederdorf/Villabassa with Innichen/San Candido, and rather closer, and to the east. The population centres of Innsbruck and Vienna were suddenly closer. Emma Hellenstainer had applied her prodigious powers of persuasion to having the course of the line moved to the very edge of Niederdorf/Villabassa, on its southern side. While many among the townsfolk were appalled by the noise and dirt created by a railway so close to their homes, local businesses were delighted to have the station so close. For Emma Hellenstainer, the station's location, approximately 200 meters from the "Schwarzadler", was perfect, providing excellent access for guests from out of town, but avoiding the worst of the disturbance to be expected from the first train in the morning. During the 1870s there was a rapid increase in tourism numbers, and despite the development of an elaborate (by the standards of the times) tourism infrastructure, including the construction of new guest houses and hotels in villages along the valley, Emma Hellenstainer, with her flair for publicity and networking, along with her leading role in the regional DAV, was well placed to benefit commercially from it. But the years that followed were not without further setbacks.

In 1882, the hotel was badly affected by flooding which left Niederdorf/Villabassa under water after the normally docile Rienz//Rienza overtopped its banks, not during the spring thaw but, unusually, after many days of heavy rain during the first half of September. Many houses closest to the river were destroyed. Damage to the railway closed down the line for four months. The hotel buildings had to be evacuated on 17 September. Hellenstainer remained calm. A hotel guest from Vienna, greatly impressed by her reaction, wrote in the hotel guest book of "...how much the woman, threatened by the danger and badly tested, was concerned for and devoted herself only to the guests, throughout the catastrophe: that will remain, with deepest gratitude, my lasting memory". (Note: "Wie sehr die von der Gefahr bedrohte und hart geprüfte Frau auch während der Katastrophe für ihre Gäste besorgt gewesen und ihrer gedacht hat, wird diese stets in dankbarster Erinnerung bleiben".)

During the closing decades of the nineteenth century Emma Hellenstainer continued to ride the still accelerating boom in Alpine tourism with aplomb. By the start of the twentieth century she and her family owned much of the property in and around Niederdorf/Villabassa. She had taken personal charge of the culinary education of the hotel kitchen staff, and while they were growing up she had paid close attending to the education of her sons and daughters. She always placed particular stress of building their multi-cultural awareness and language skills. She therefore became not just the mother of a large family and the proprietress-manager of a flourishing hotel business, but also the matriarch of a hands-on hotelier dynasty.

=== Later years ===
In 1887, a few months before her seventieth birthday, Emma Hellenstainer retired from hands-on hotel management. She moved to the former Tyrolean capital of Meran(o), still an important regional centre, where her elder son Eduoard and her daughter Josefine ran the "Hotel Stadt München" ("Hotel City of Munich"). She still returned to spend her summers Niederdorf/Villabassa, till the completion in 1899 of family's new lakeside grand hotel higher up the mountains, where she preferred to spend summer during her final years. At the time of her retirement her energies were far from spent. Soon after her retirement her son, Eduard Hellenstainer (1853-1903), started work on a new project for a 70 bedroom grand hotel (increased to 102 bedrooms after an annex was added in 1902) in the mountains, almost 1500 m above sea level, on the shores of the Pragser Wildsee (lake), which Johann Hellenstainer had inherited from an uncle half a century earlier: several sources indicate that many aspects of the new development were a collaborative enterprises between mother and son. Construction commenced in 1897 and the hotel opened in July 1899. A brisk three-hour walk from the village, and not always easy to access by cart or carriage, the hotel was built with its own small power generation facility, which meant that the rooms featured electric lighting: guests unwilling to face the stairs could use the electric lift/elevator instead. Even in Vienna and Milan, these were unusual features in hotels of the time. Reflecting its remote location, the hotel also boasted its own post office, bakery, butchers shop and dairy. It also had its own water supply, directly from a conveniently nearby thermal source, as well as fashionably modern and lavish bathrooms fittings. Guests included royalty and other celebrities of the day. Today the hotel is unique among grand hotels from the nineteenth century in being still owned and managed by a direct descendant of its creator (and, indeed, of his mother). It became a matter of great pride to the family that whereas other hotels and hotel complexes in the area were built by outsiders and funded by corporate investors and banks from the cities, the extensive portfolio of hotels in and around the Puster Valley built and operated by members of the Hellensteiner dynasty were always funded from the family's own resources.

Emma Hellenstainer lived out her final winter in Meran(o) at the "Hotel Stadt München", where she died in the presence of her children aged 85 or 86 (sources differ) on 9 March 1904.

== Legacy ==
- Many sources pay tribute to the many awards and prizes that Emma Hellenstainer received during her life. Particularly treasured was the silver medal which she was awarded for her "tea butter" at the 1884 Vienna Cookery Fair. In due course the recipe found its way into the imperial. Characteristically, Hellenstainer took the opportunity to upscale production and market her tea butter commercially. Although the nature and extent of the Postbus business she had inherited from her husband had changed with the opening of the railway in 1871, she continued to sustain the travel and transport operation, which she was able to integrate into a wholesaling business, obtaining and providing to the local retailers attractively priced "exotic products" from Italy - including olives, pomegranates, melons, figs and lemons, along with hard lowland cheeses such as Parmesan - all delivered in relatively fresh condition.
- The emperor awarded her the Golden Service Cross in 1882, following it up, while on a visit during 1899 to Welsberg, by personally awarding her the Golden Service Cross with crown. Since various of his nearer family members had been guests at her hotel, it is not to be wondered at that he evidently knew just who she was. After the little ceremony he stopped for short chat: "So you're the world-famous Frau Emma? I am delighted to meet you in person in your old age, and still fully fit for work. With this richly deserved award, I wish you many more years of good life". (Note: "Also Sie sind die weltbekannte Frau Emma? Ich freue mich, Sie persönlich kennen zu lernen in Ihrem hohen Alter und bei der Ihnen noch gegönnten Rüstigkeit zur Arbeit. Mit der wohlverdienten Auszeichnung wünsche ich Ihnen noch viele Jahre des Wohlergehens!")
- After she died, Emma Hellenstainer's children agreed to build in Meran(o) a new grander grand hotel, the "Hotel Emma". It opened in 1908. Josephina Hellenstainer (1847–1936), the third of Emma's five daughters, took on the management, supported by her brother Hermann. The spectacular Jugendstil building still stands, communicating with its extravagant decorations the confidence in the inevitability of a better future that seemed to have died by 1918. (Hermann Hellenstainer had died unexpectedly in 1915.) During both the two big European wars the hotel was converted for hospital use. Nevertheless, through most of the twentieth century, when times were relatively good, it welcomed more than its fair share of celebrity guests. But fashions in tourism were changing: after 1945 Merano suffered from a massive over-supply of hotel bedrooms, and when, in the 1960s, mass tourism recovered, it was beach holidays rather than Alpine spa resort holidays that best caught the spirit of the times. In 1985 the west wing - roughly 40% of the total floor space - at the Hotel Emma was converted into residential apartments and offices. In 1995 the residual hotel in the remaining 60% closed down. There were plans to convert the remaining 60% of the building for residential use, but in the end, given the shortage of teaching accommodation in the city, it was sold to the municipality in 1999 as a ready-to-use school or college facility. As matters turned out, the rooms were not well designed for classroom use, and preservation orders severely limited the extent to which the ground floor rooms could be adapted. However, after a number of interior walls were removed and ceilings lowered on the upper floors, and "sensitive adaptations" to the ground floor rooms had been implemented, in 2001 the "Marie Curie College of Tourism and Biotechnology" moved in. Nevertheless, for many students of buildings history and architecture, the construction of the Hotel Emma is probably of more interest than the hotel's celebrity guests or its chequered commercial fate during the war-torn twentieth century. The principal load-bearing structures were made from concrete reinforced with steel rods. This made it, in 1907, a "European first" in hotel construction. Emma Hellenstainer's taste for pioneering new methods in business had evidently been passed on to the next generation.
- In 2005, the television documentary film "Frau Emma Europa – eine berühmte Gastwirtin in Tirol" ("... a famous Tyrolean hotelier"), directed by Jochen Unterhofer and featuring a script authored by Markus Larcher, won the "Farfalla del Trentino prize" at Trent(o)'s 53rd International Mountain Film Festival.
- Early in 2015, the (West) German sculptor Stephan Balkenhol created a jolie-laide painted bronze portrait-sculpture of Emma Hellenstainer as a contribution to that year's "Menschen Bilder / Human Shapes / Figure Umane" arts-project. It has been sited along the "Passerpromenade" ("Passer Riverside walk") on Meran(o).
- In 2021, her accomplishments are remembered and celebrated through the naming of the "Emma Hellenstainer regional academy for Hospitality and Gastronomy" ("Landesberufsschule für das Gast- und Nahrungsmittelgewerbe „Emma Hellenstainer“") in Brixen. Her pioneering work in developing the tourism industry is also the subject of permanent exhibitions at the "Touriseum" in Meran(o), the little "Fremdenverkehrsmuseum Hochpustertal" ("Upper Puster Valley Tourism Museum") in the "Haus Wassermann" at Niederdorf/Villabassa and, in the town of her birth, the "Museum St. Johann in Tirol".
