= Seekofel =

Mountain in Italy

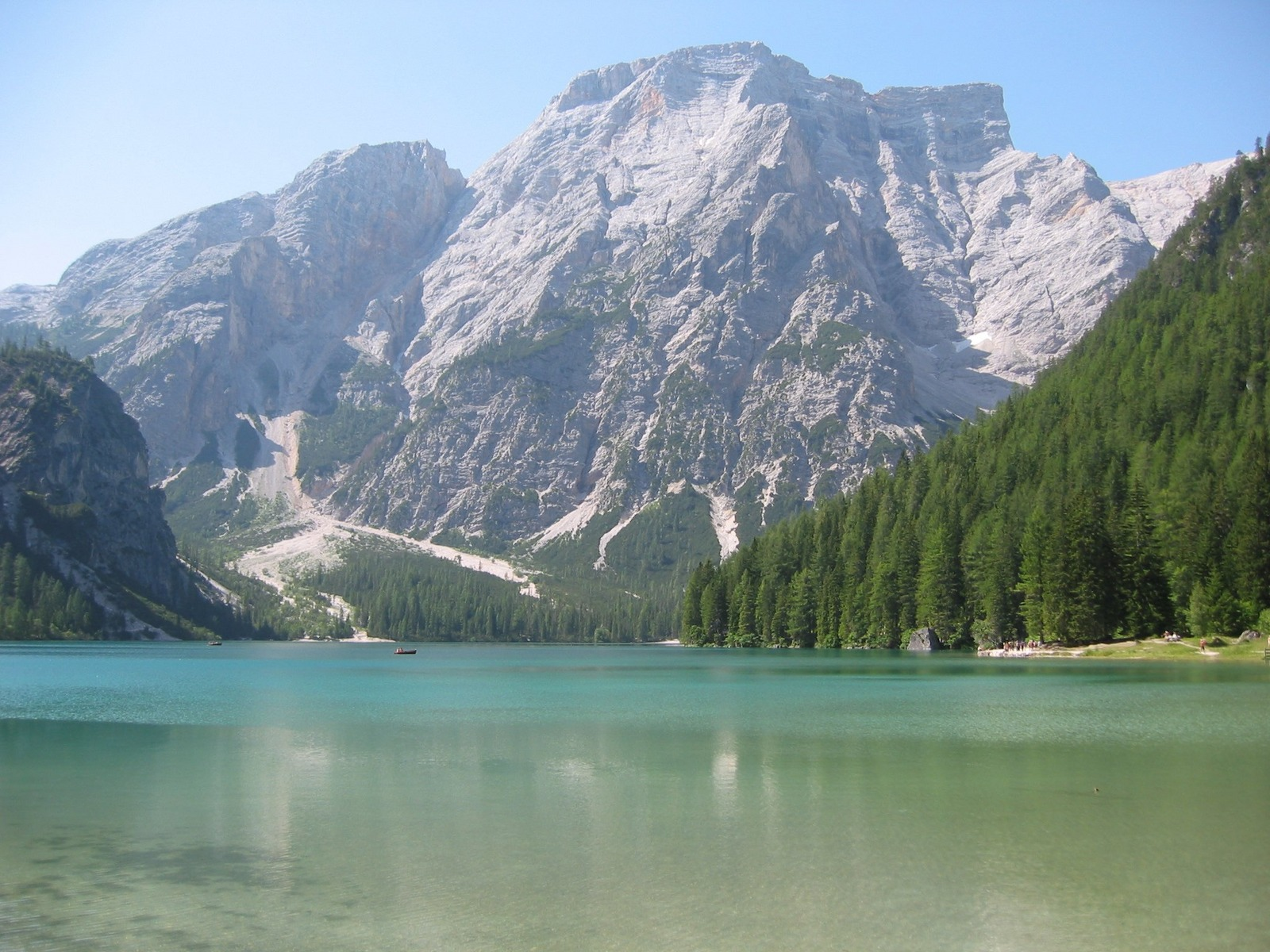

Highest point
- Elevation: 2,810 m (9,220 ft)
- Coordinates: 46°40′30.8″N 12°04′22.0″E

Geography
- Location within Italy
- Location: South Tyrol (Italy)
- Parent range: Dolomites

The Seekofel (Ladin: Sass dla Porta; Italian: Croda del Becco; German: Seekofel) is a mountain in the Dolomites on the border between South Tyrol and the Province of Belluno, Italy.

== Climate ==
Based on the Köppen climate classification, Seekofel is located in an alpine climate zone with long, cold winters, and short, mild summers. Weather systems are forced upwards by the mountains (orographic lift), causing moisture to drop in the form of rain and snow. The months of June through September offer the most favorable weather for visiting or climbing in this area.

== Gallery ==
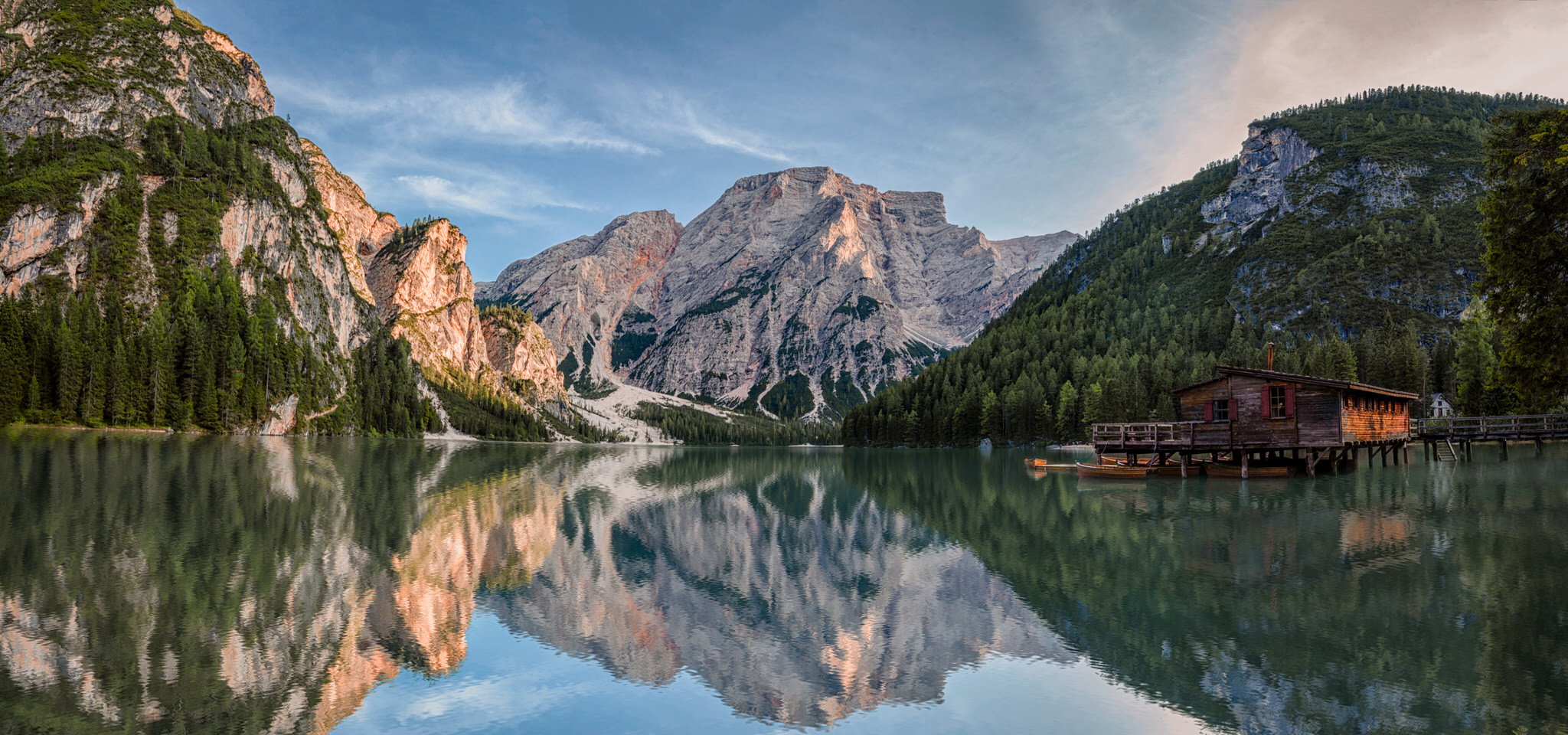
Seekofel centered and reflected in Pragser Wildsee

== See also ==
- Southern Limestone Alps
