= Pragser Wildsee =

Lake in the Dolomites in South Tyrol, Italy

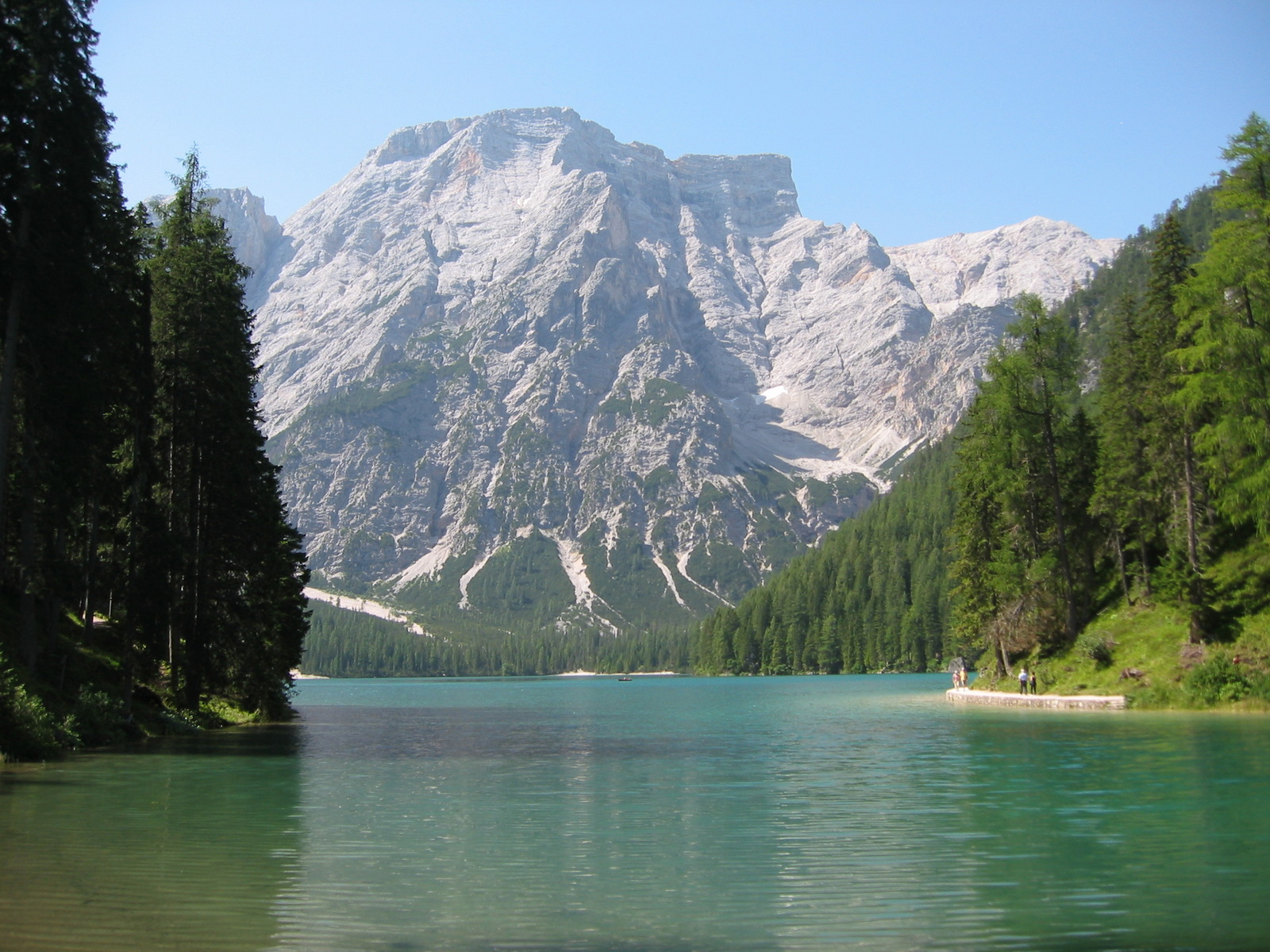
- Pragser Wildsee and Seekofel seen from the bay

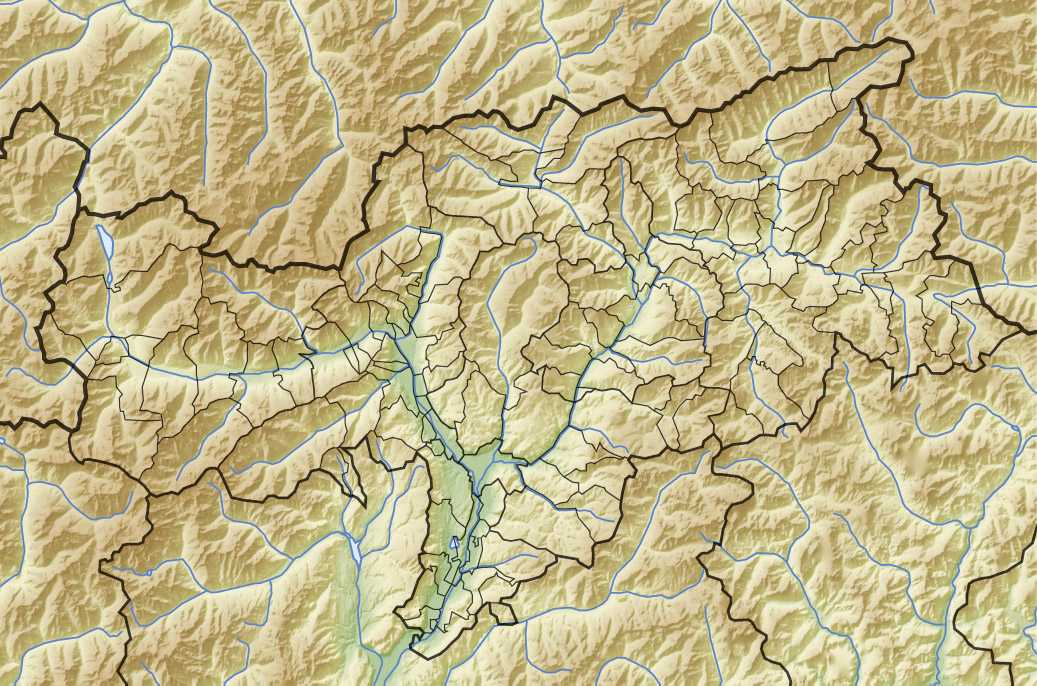
- Location within South Tyrol
- Location: South Tyrol
- Coordinates: 46°41′41″N 12°5′4″E
- Catchment area: 30.09 km^{2} (11.62 sq mi)
- Basin countries: Italy
- Surface area: 31 ha (77 acres)
- Average depth: 17 m (56 ft)
- Max. depth: 36 m (118 ft)
- Water volume: 5,300,000 m^{3} (0.0013 cu mi)
- Shore length^{1}: 3.05 km (2 mi)
- Surface elevation: 1,496 m (4,908 ft)
- Settlements: Prags
- ^{1} Shore length is not a well-defined measure.

The Pragser Wildsee, or Lake Prags, Lake Braies (Italian: Lago di Braies; Ladin: Lech de Braies; German: Pragser Wildsee) is a natural lake in the Prags Dolomites in South Tyrol, Italy. It belongs to the municipality of Prags which is located in the Prags Valley.

During World War II, it was the destination of the transport of concentration camp inmates to Tyrol.

While the lake earned the nickname "Pearl of the Alps" due to its increasing popularity among tourists, tourism had become excessive as of 2020, with 17,000 people visiting the area on a single summer day. As of the summer 2023, vehicle access was restricted because of overtourism.

== Toponym ==
The name of the lake is attested in 1296 as Hünz an den Se, in 1330 as Praxersee, in 1400 as See in Prags, in 1620 as Pragsersee and in 1885 as Pragser Wildsee; the appellation of the wild is therefore nineteenth-century, and perhaps to be connected to mountaineering which in that period began to become a mass phenomenon. The Italian name "Lago di Braies" dates back to 1940, while in the first Handbook of 1923 it still appears only as "Pragser Wildsee".

== Geography ==
The lake lies at the foot of the imposing rock face of the Seekofel (Italian Croda del Becco, Ladin Sass dla Porta 2,810 m) and is located within the Fanes - Sennes - Prags nature park.

It has an extension of about 31 hectares with a length of 1.2 km and a width of 300-400 metres. It is one of the deepest lakes in the autonomous province of Bolzano, with a maximum depth of 36 meters and an average depth of 17. The maximum water temperature is 14 °C. It is a barrage lake, as its creation is due to the barrage of the Prags River due to a landslide detached from the Herrstein.

The lake is a tourist destination, which attracts visitors for the blue/emerald green color of its clear waters and for the natural scenery in which it is immersed. In fact, the lake is surrounded on three sides by Dolomite peaks, including the Seekofel. The lake is the starting point of the Alta via no. 1 of the Dolomites called "The classic" which reaches Belluno at the foot of the Schiara Group.

== Filmography ==
In the summer of 2010, on the shores of Pragser Wildsee, the Italian television series "Un passo dal cielo" was shot, broadcast by Rai 1 since 2011, focusing on the life of a team commander of the Forestry Corps of the autonomous province of Bolzano from Innichen. In the summer of 2012, the second series of the fiction was shot, the third, the fourth, and in 2018 the fifth season.

On 28 December 2016, the second episode of the documentary series Speciali Storia - Hostages of the SS was broadcast on Rai Storia, which reconstructed the story of April 1945 of the prisoners of the Pragser Wildsee.

== Tourism ==
Thanks to the popularity of the 2011 Italian TV series Un passo dal cielo, the Pragser Wildsee became one of the most visited places in the region Trentino-South Tyrol as it started to attract countless travel bloggers, influencers and professional photographers. The large inflow of tourism brought local administrators to think of ways to reduce the number of visits to preserve the mountain-lake ecosystem.

From July to September 2018, already 1.2 million visitors came to the Pragser Wildsee, per the Autonomous Region of Bolzano-South Tyrol in 2020. A peak of 17,874 visitors was recorded on one day in August. Since these excessive numbers are "not good for the natural environment in the long term", the region decided to restrict access for tourists per the Heimatverband Südtirol, which made it necessary to establish rules, to route them.

In the summer of 2023, for example, the road into the Pragser Valley was closed during daylight hours 10/07/2023 to 10/09/2023 and the reservation for a parking ticket cost 38 €.

The lake must be approached from its north side via the Prags Valley. It is possible to take a tour around the banks of the lake. This route is flat and wide on the west bank, while on the east bank, it is steep and narrow, with some stairways. During the winter period, these paths (especially the one on the eastern shore) are often closed, due to the danger of avalanches.

== Sports ==
Since 2012, curling competitions have been held on the frozen surface of the lake during the winter season.

== Gallery ==
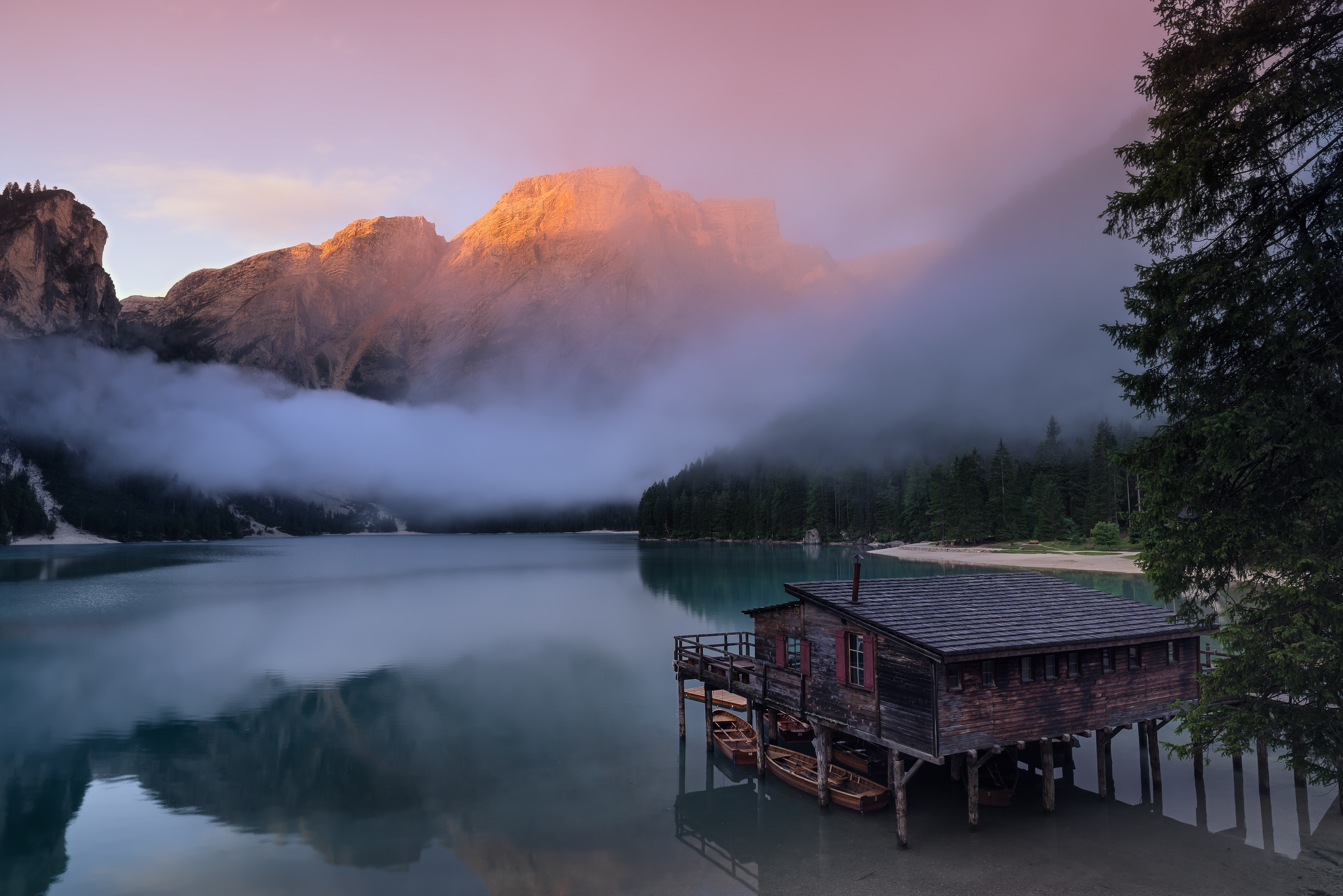
Sunrise

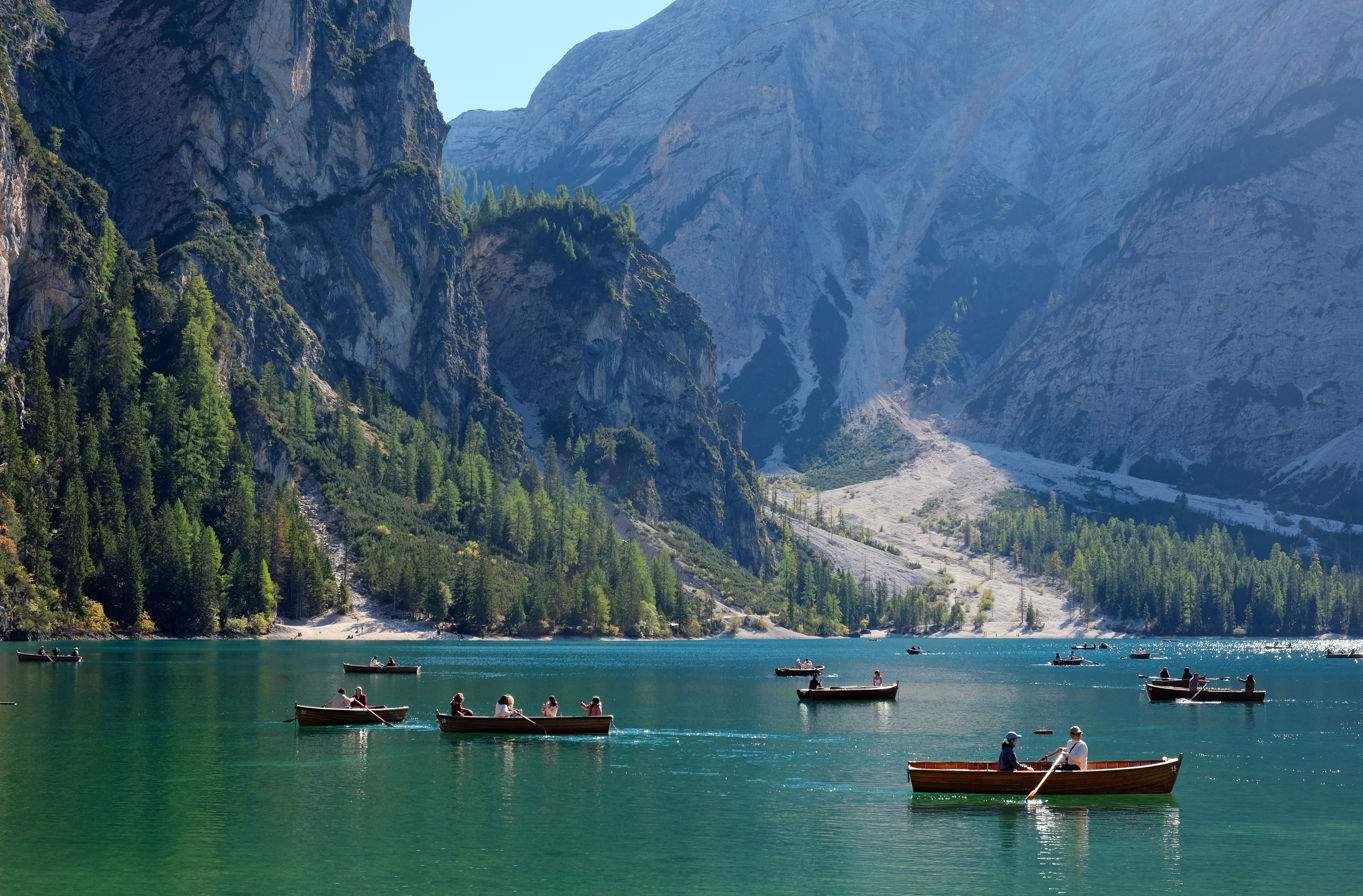
Rowing boats on the lake

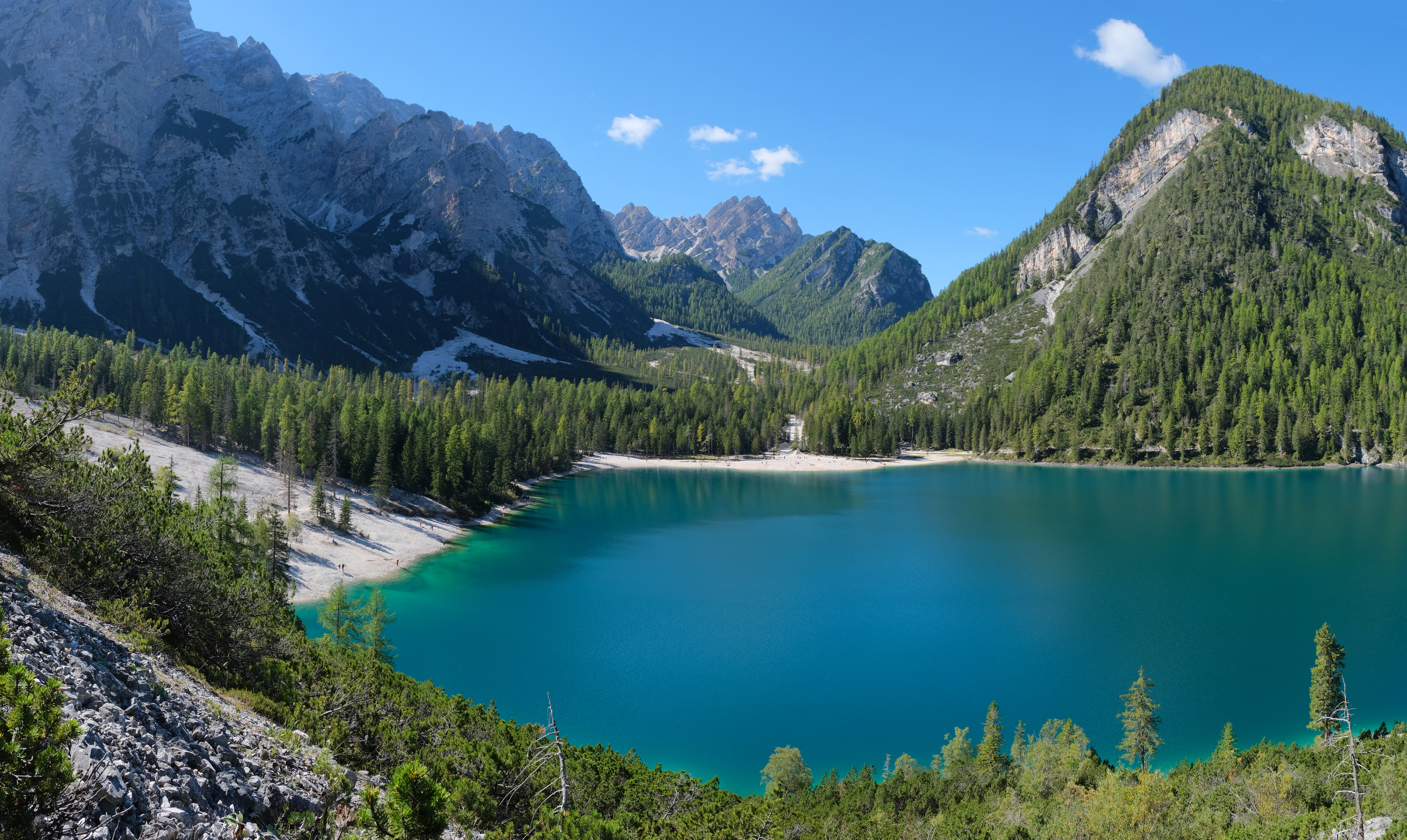
Southern part of the lake

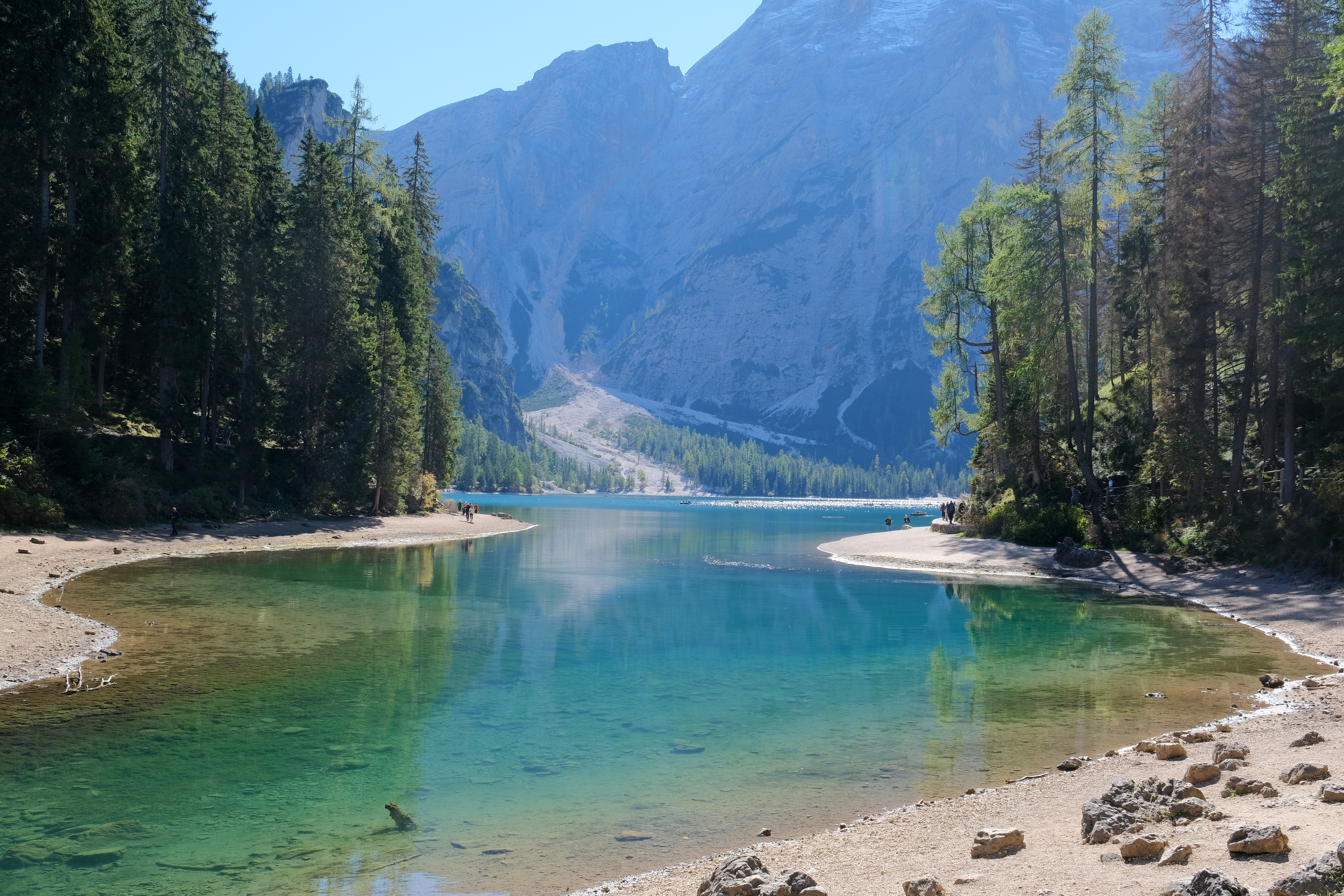
Northern Tip of the lake

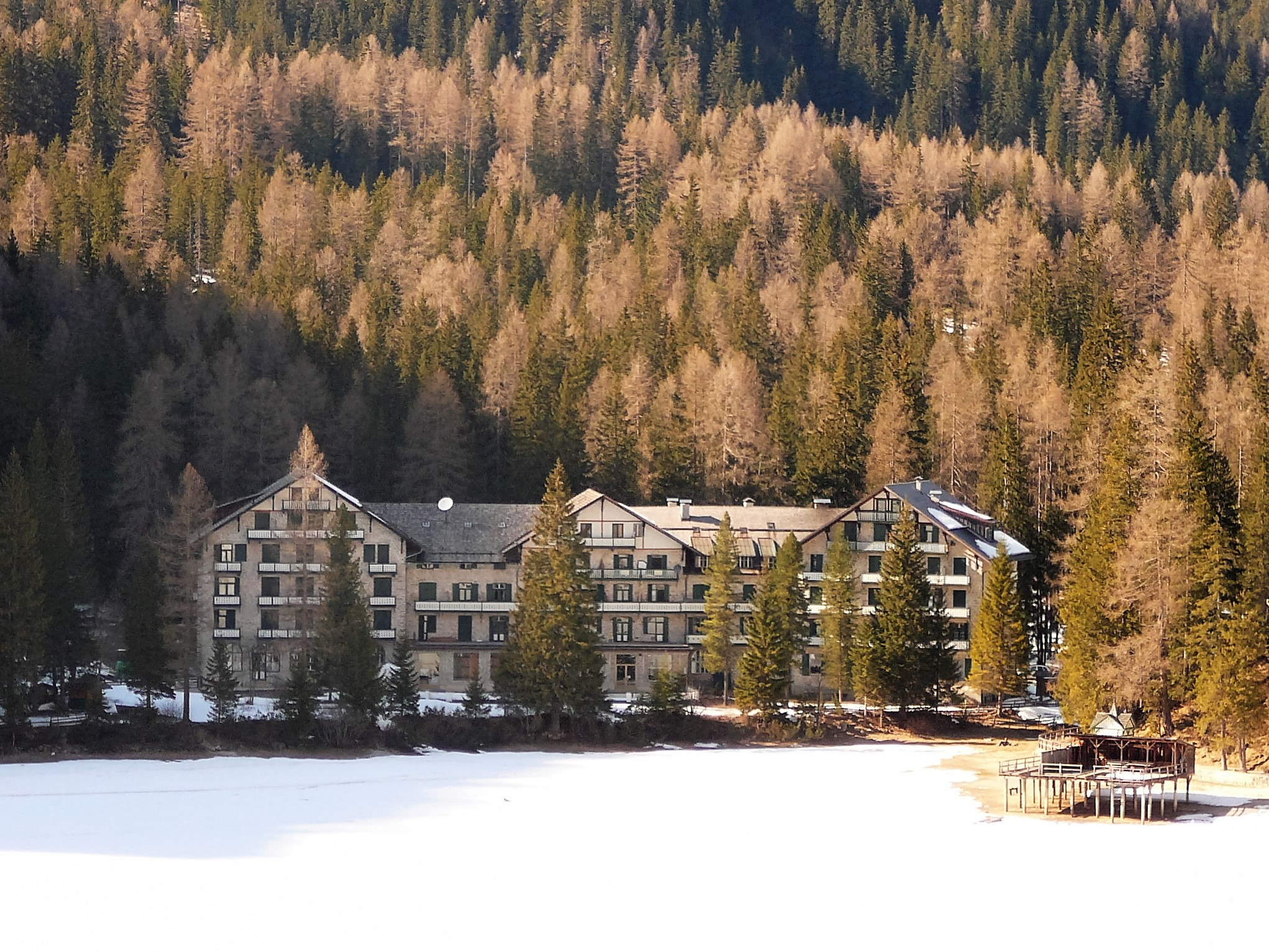
Hotel Pragser Wildsee

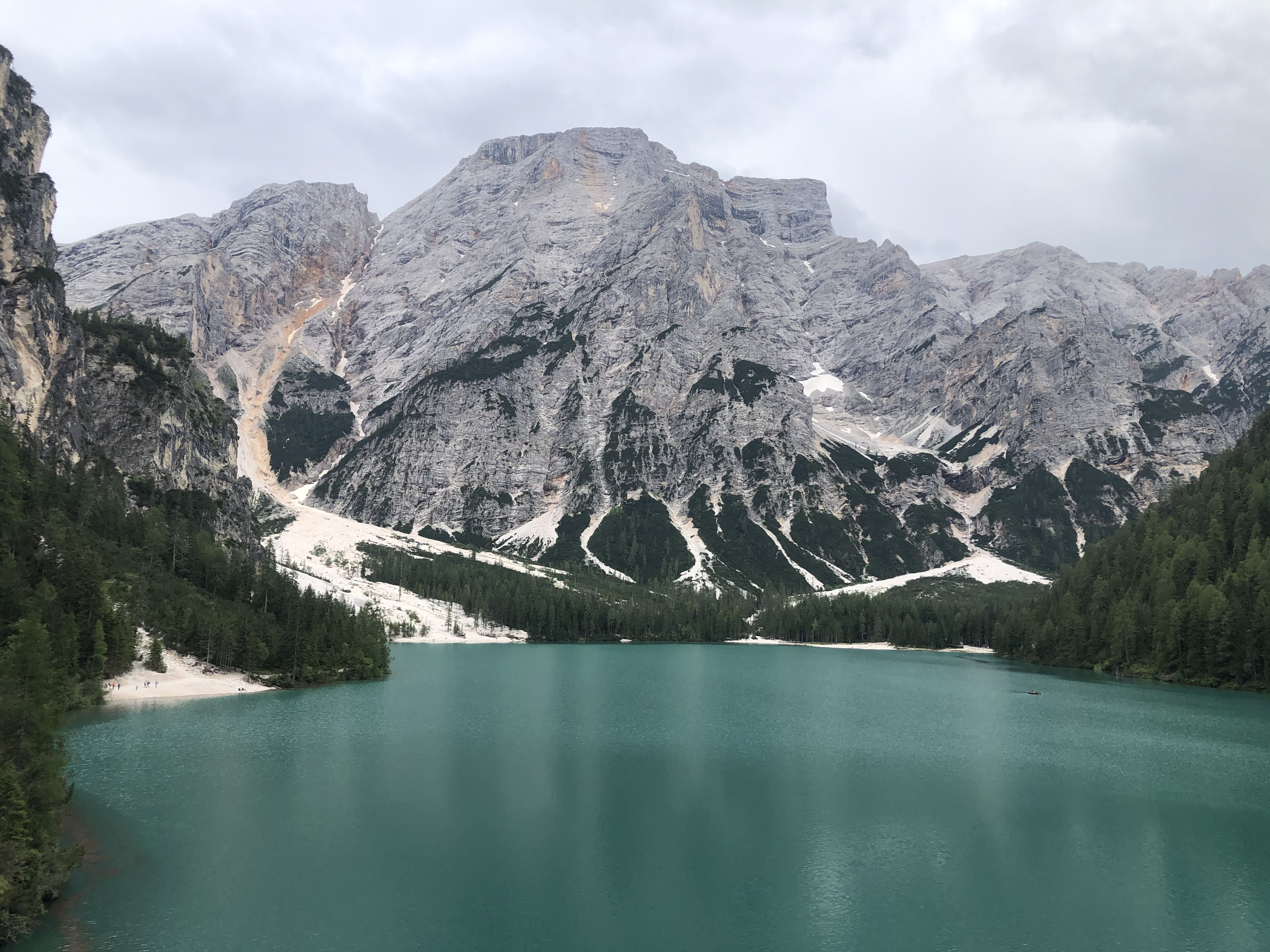
Lake Braies with Seekofel
