= Emmanuel Véry-Hermence =

Emmanuel Auguste Irénée Véry-Hermence (31 March 1904 in Sainte-Marie, Martinique – 19 June 1966 in Paris) was a socialist politician from Martinique who was elected to the French National Assembly in 1946.
