= Noah Raby =

American debunked centenarian (1822–1904)

Noah Raby in 1901

Noah Raby (April 1, 1772 or 1822 – March 1, 1904) was an American notable for his longevity claim of the early 20th century. He supposedly lived to be 131. He claimed not just a remarkable age, but also a historical deed (fought in the War of 1812).

Even before his death, Noah Raby's age claim was noted with some skepticism:

Noah Raby, also a pauper, an inmate of the almshouse at Piscatawa, [sic] near New Brunswick, New Jersey, celebrated what he said was his 125th birthday on April 1, 1897. He was born in Gates County, North Carolina, his father being a full-blooded Indian named Andrew Bass. He says he was discharged from the man-of-war "Braudywine" [sic] eighty-four years ago, but has lost his discharge papers; that he heard Washington make an angry public address at Norfolk; that he began smoking when he was five years old, and has continued to smoke ever since, and has always been a drinker of liquors. It is on his unsupported statement that the people of the neighborhood regard him with local pride.

However, census data indicate that Noah Raby was only 81 years old at the time of his death. He is listed as 28 years old in the 1850 census, born in North Carolina and living in New Jersey.

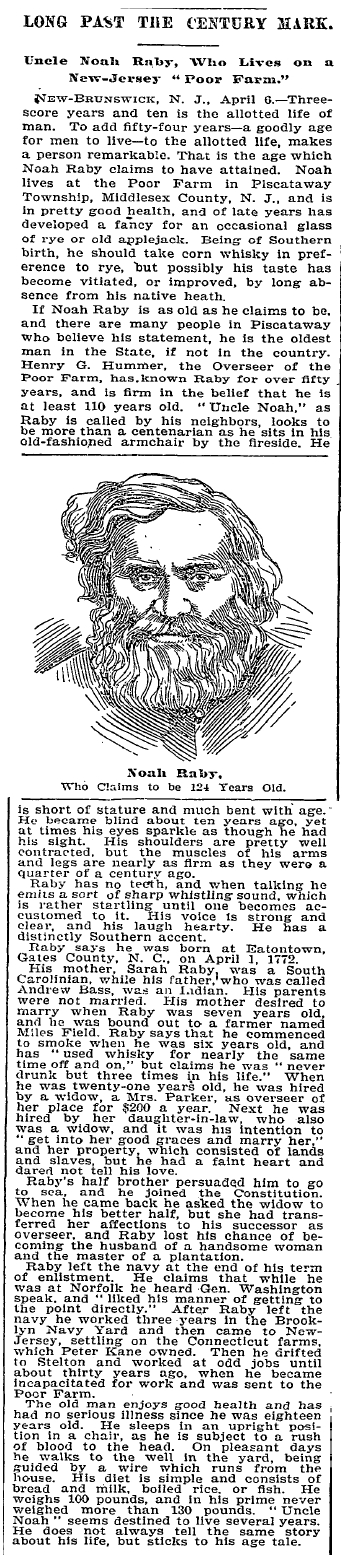
New York Times; April 7, 1896

== See also ==
- Longevity claims
- Longevity traditions
