= Giulio Cesare Uccelini =

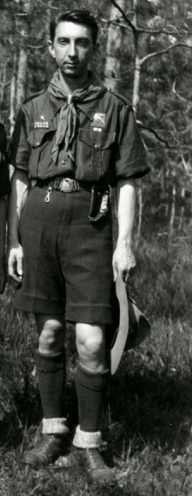
- 1936 in Groane
- Born: March 11, 1904; Milan
- Died: March 23, 1957 (aged 53); Milan
- Known for: Leading figure in Catholic Scouting in Lombardy and in the Italian resistance movement

Giulio Cesare Uccelini (Milan, March 11, 1904 – Milan, 23 March 1957) was a leading figure in Catholic Scouting in Lombardy and in the Italian resistance movement through the end of World War II.

Uccellini joined Scouting around 1917, when, despite the opposition of his father, he entered the Milan group II ASCI (Associazione Scouts Cattolici Italiani). Driven by a strong civic and religious sense, he renounced his professional career in the Bank of Italy and the creation of a family to dedicate his life to Scouting, even after 1928, when the fascist laws outlawed the Scout movement.

== Stray Eagles ==
When it was decreed that ASCI members must wear the Opera Nazionale Balilla on their uniforms in 1927, Uccellini refused, and again refused to hand over the ASCI insignia when Scouting was finally suppressed in 1928.

Uccellini did not accept the end of Scouting, and continued to keep his group alive clandestinely with some members, which he named it:Aquile randagie "Stray Eagles". He continued to pursue his ideas of freedom and non-violence, serving as a courageous role model, continuing in his efforts even after the police had beaten him up, causing serious hearing damage.

His group, which in the meantime had also welcomed new members and Scouts belonging to the other groups now dissolved, continued the clandestine activities, with annual summer camps and also participating in the 5th World Scout Jamboree in Vogelenzang, Netherlands. On August 9, 1937, Uccellini met 81-year-old Robert Baden-Powell, founder of the movement, who was impressed by the story of the Stray Eagles and urged Uccellini to continue his activities.

During the 6th World Scout Jamboree, held in Moisson, France in 1947, Uccellini received the nickname "Bad Boy" from J.S. Wilson, then director of the World Scout Bureau.

== World War II ==
During World War II, and especially after 8 September 1943, Uccellini, along with other Stray Eagle leaders, sought ways to help persons wanted by the Fascists, and participated in the birth of the Organizzazione Scout Collocamento Assistenza Ricercati.

== Death ==
Uccellini died March 23, 1957, at age 53 from a stomach tumor. He requested to be buried in uniform, with the fleur-de-lis over his heart and the Gilwell scarf around his neck, and his four beads, insignia of Deputy Camp Chief, a testimony of his attachment to a movement to which he had devoted his life.

== Honors and awards ==
Uccellini was awarded the gold medal from the province of Milan for educational merit. The Base Camp of Colico, south of Montecchio on Lake Como, for ASCI, Associazione Guide Italiane and later Associazione Guide e Scouts Cattolici Italiani leaders, ecclesiastical assistants, Rovers and Explorers was dedicated in his memory.

== In popular culture ==
Stray Eagles (original title: "Aquile Randagie") (2019) historical film about the true story of an Italian group of boy scouts during the fascist dictatorship, and how they cooperated for the liberation of Italy from nazi-fascism.
