= Prags =

- Comune
- Gemeinde Prags; Comune di Braies
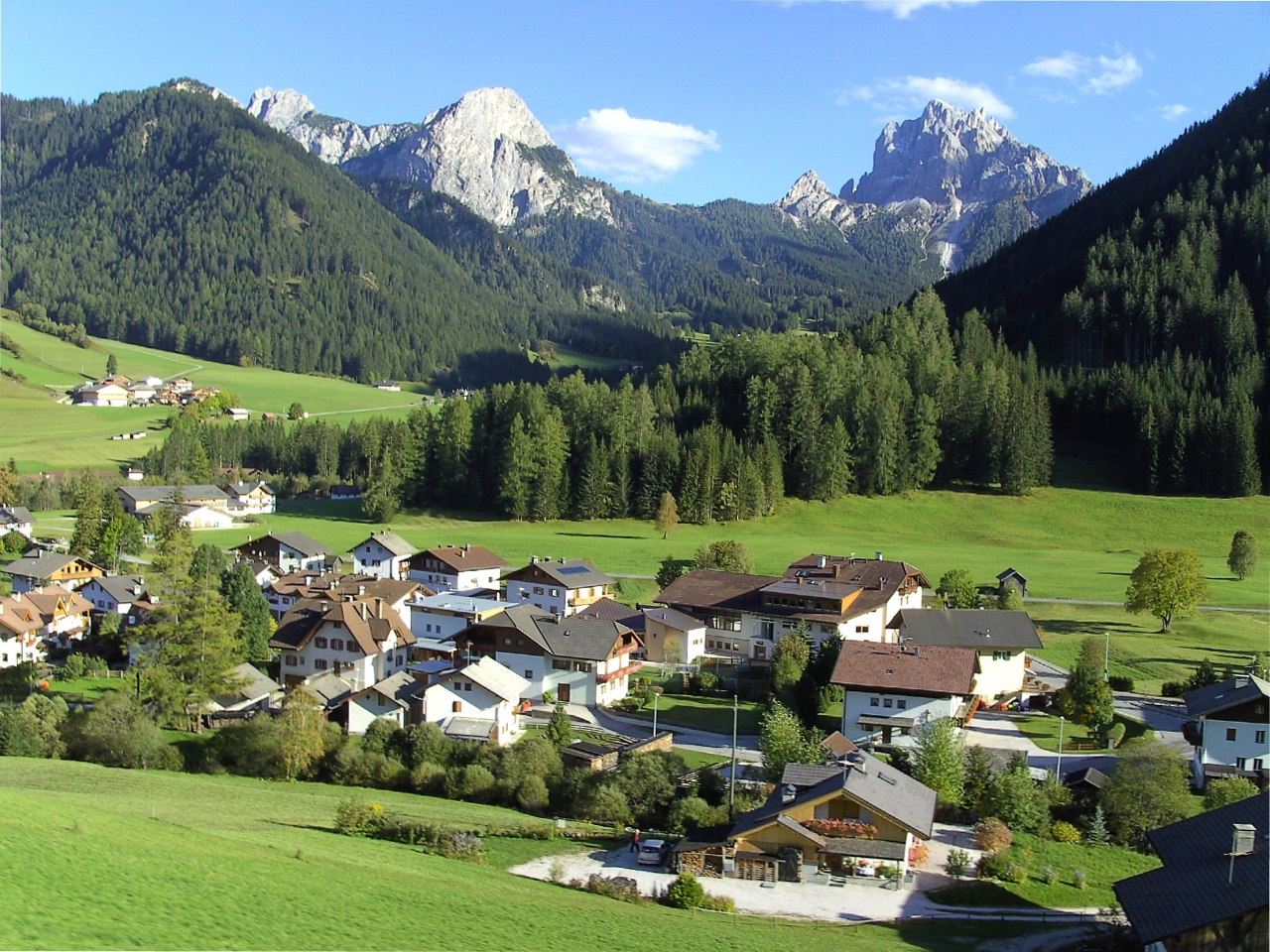
- View of Prags

- Coat of arms

- Location within Italy Location within Trentino-Alto Adige/Südtirol
- Coordinates: 46°43′N 12°8′E
- Country: Italy
- Region: Trentino-Alto Adige/Südtirol
- Province: South Tyrol (BZ)
- Frazioni: Außerprags (Braies di Fuori), Innerprags (Braies di Dentro), St. Veit (San Vito), Schmieden (Ferrara).

Government
  - Mayor: Friedrich Mittermair

Area
  - Total: 89.2 km^{2} (34.4 sq mi)

Population (Nov. 2010)
  - Total: 657
  - Density: 7.37/km^{2} (19.1/sq mi)
- Demonym(s): German: Pragser; Italian: di Braies
- Time zone: UTC+1 (CET)
  - Summer (DST): UTC+2 (CEST)
- Postal code: 39030
- Dialing code: 0474
- Website: Official website

Prags (German pronunciation: [praks]; Italian: Braies [ˈbraːjes]; Ladin: Braies) is a comune (municipality) and a village in South Tyrol in northern Italy, located about 60 kilometres (37 mi) northeast of Bolzano.

== Geography ==
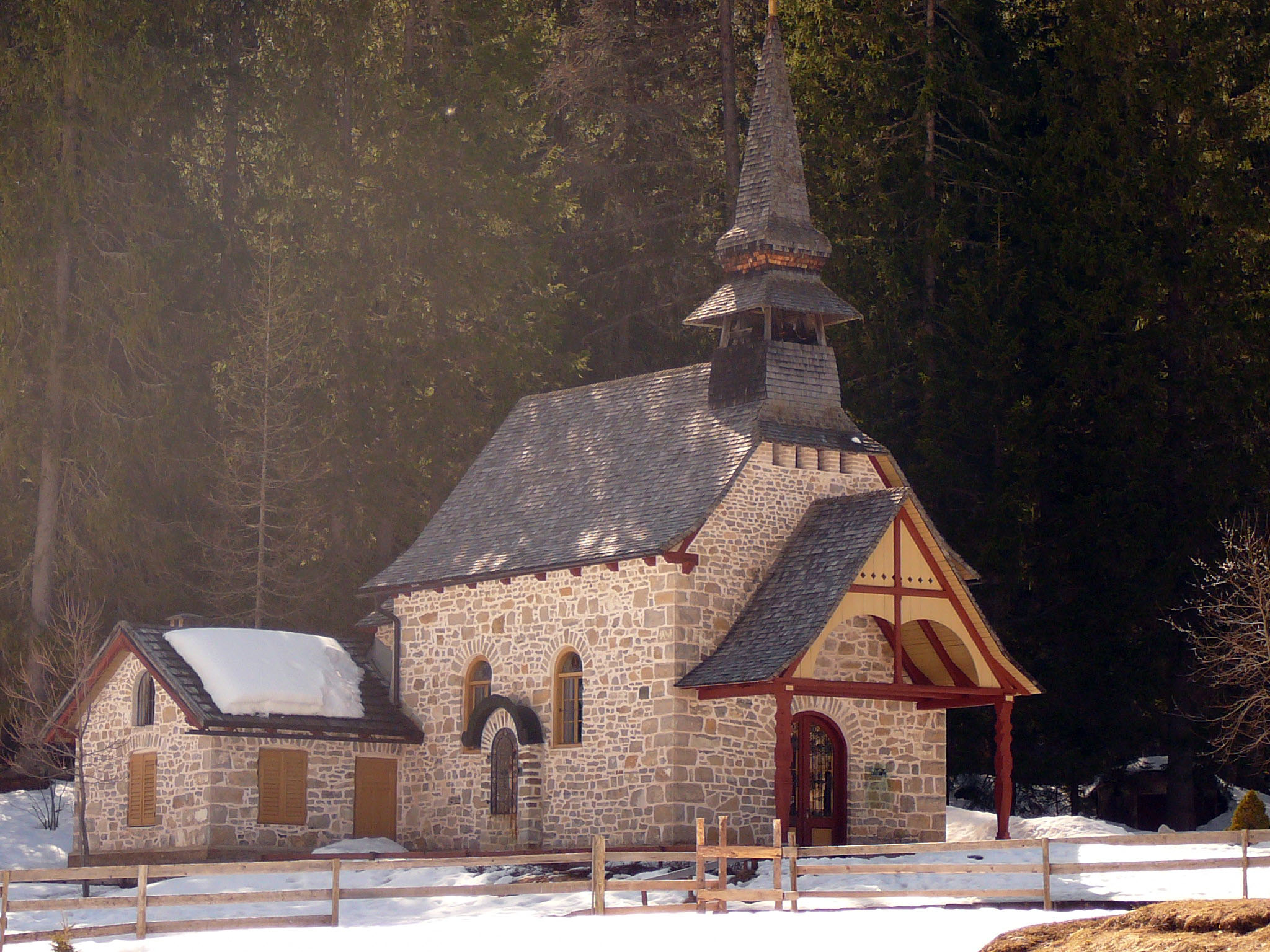
The Marienkapelle

As of 30 November 2010, it had a population of 657 and an area of 89.2 square kilometres (34.4 mi^{2}).

Prags is located in the Prags valley in the northern Dolomites. The valley is split into two branches, the western one ending at the Pragser Wildsee, a mountain lake, the eastern one at the Plätzwiese, an extended alpine pasture.

Prags borders the following municipalities: Cortina d'Ampezzo, Toblach, Mareo, Welsberg-Taisten, Olang, and Niederdorf.

=== Frazioni ===
The municipality of Prags contains the frazioni (subdivisions, mainly villages and hamlets) Außerprags (Braies di Fuori), Innerprags (Braies di Dentro), Schmieden (Ferrara) and St. Veit (San Vito).

== History ==
=== Coat-of-arms ===
The emblem represents a stag on a mountain with three vert peaks, crossed by a wavy stream of argent. The emblem was granted in 1968.

== Society ==
=== Linguistic distribution ===
According to the 2024 census, 96.75% of the population speak German, 3.10% Italian and 0.15% Ladin as first language.

Language	1991	2001	2011	2024
German	97.47%	96.89%	99.23%	96.75%
Italian	2.02%	2.79%	0.61%	3.10%
Ladin	0.51%	0.33%	0.15%	0.15%

=== Demographic evolution ===
Historical population

Year	Pop.	±%
1861	?	—
1871	?	—
1881	?	—
1901	?	—
1911	?	—

Year	Pop.	±%
1921	606	—
1931	690	+13.9%
1936	718	+4.1%
1951	682	−5.0%
1961	726	+6.5%

Year	Pop.	±%
1971	689	−5.1%
1981	644	−6.5%
1991	613	−4.8%
2001	633	+3.3%

Source: Data from ISTAT
