= Antonietta Cimolini =

Italian aviator and soprano

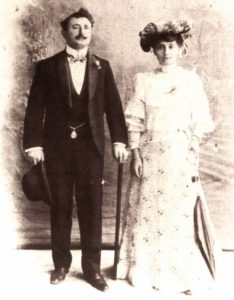
- Antonietta alongside her husband, Giuseppe
- Born: 1878; Casola Valsenio, Italy
- Died: 13 March 1904 (aged 26); Buenos Aires, Argentina
- Cause of death: Drowning
- Known for: Aeronaut, soprano

Antonietta Cimolini (1878 – 13 March 1904) was an Italian aviation pioneer. She is most well known for her participation in acrobatic hot air balloon shows which she performed alongside her husband, Giuseppe Silimbani, in Argentina.

== Early life ==
Antonietta Clotilde Cimolini was born in 1878 in the commune of Casola Valsenio in the Province of Ravenna, Italy. Her parents, Carlo Cimolini and Penelope Frassineti, belonged to the petty bourgeoisie.

In 1900, Cimolini received a degree in obstetrics. She later married Giuseppe Silimbani, a baker, tenor, and sportsman from Forlì, Italy against the wishes of her parents. Their disappointment was augmented after Antonietta and Giuseppe performed balloon air shows in Forlì and Ravenna. Their performances were popular with the public but reportedly brought a sense of dishonor to Cimolini's parents.

== Life in Argentina ==
In 1902, Antonietta and Giuseppe moved to Argentina. They brought their newborn daughter, Ofelia, with them and the pair settled in Buenos Aires. Cimolini was a soprano and, after moving, the couple first earned an income by performing duets together in theaters. They practiced their balloon shows in private in order to perfect them before presenting them to the public.

The tobacco industry was growing in Argentina at the turn of the twentieth century due in part to railroad expansion in the country. Due to the high saturation of tobacco industry within the country, each company was forced to compete for the favor of the public. This was achieved through the use of advertisements such as artistic packaging and the sponsorship of public events.

The Silimbanis capitalized on this sponsorship by partnering with the Flo brothers in 1903, Rosario-based cigarette manufacturers who produced Americana and Siglo XX. These companies would provide compensation to the couple in exchange for their logo being displayed on their Montgolfier balloon which was named "Forlì's Invincible" or, literally, "the Unbeatable of Forlì". They toured Argentine cities, performing trapeze stunts and releasing advertising flyers for the cigarette manufacturers from the balloon.

Their first air show in Argentina was held in Rosario on 17 January 1903 and the local press advertised the event. Instead of flying the balloons from the safety of a basket which was customary, the couple would take turns flying the balloon while hanging from a trapeze and then perform acrobatics for the crowd. Events also consisted of live music and promotions for the sponsoring tobacco company. The shows were an immediate success and the Silimbanis continued them in Buenos Aires and the surrounding area.

== Accidents ==
On 2 February 1903, Antonietta was flying the balloon and performing stunts when the balloon went off course. It landed beyond an unspecified penitentiary and got caught on barbed wire, causing some damage to the balloon. However, Antonietta herself was not injured.

On 24 February of the same year, Giuseppe was performing in the town of General Paz when he crashed into a ravine.

In May 1903, Antonietta was performing the second flight of a show in bad weather when she disappeared behind a cloud, frightening onlookers.

No further accidents occurred until 31 January 1904 when the balloon was blown off course by a north-ward wind. The balloon then quickly lost elevation and landed on a roof. Again, no serious injuries were reported.

== Death ==
On the afternoon of 13 March 1904, Giuseppe and Antonietta were performing their final show in Buenos Aires. The cigarette manufacturers did not take part, but the event drew a large crowd nonetheless. Antonietta decided to complete the show despite poor weather conditions after delays drew angry shouts from the spectators.

The balloon took off from inside the local Frontón Buenos Aires with Antonietta at the helm and quickly rose to a height of approximately 150 metres (490 ft). The balloon then moved in a south-southeast direction, slowly approaching Río de la Plata before descending and eventually landing in the water. A number of spectators and witnesses gathered at the site of the landing, but both the balloon and Antonietta were gone. According to an account by Efraín Bischoff, during the descent "the figure of a woman waved her arms, first gracefully, then desperately".

Antonietta's body was recovered from the river the following day. She had a large contusion on her head and an autopsy later revealed that she had died of asphyxiation.

== Legacy ==
The story of Antonietta is most well known in Italy and Argentina as they were the countries of her birth and most famous feats respectively. In Forlì, Italy, there is a street named after Cimolini and in 1954, a plaque was erected in her memory in Buenos Aires. The plaque was sponsored by both Aero Club Argentino and the Federación General de Sociedades Italianas.
