= Niederdorf, South Tyrol =

Niederdorf
- Comune
- Gemeinde Niederdorf; Comune di Villabassa
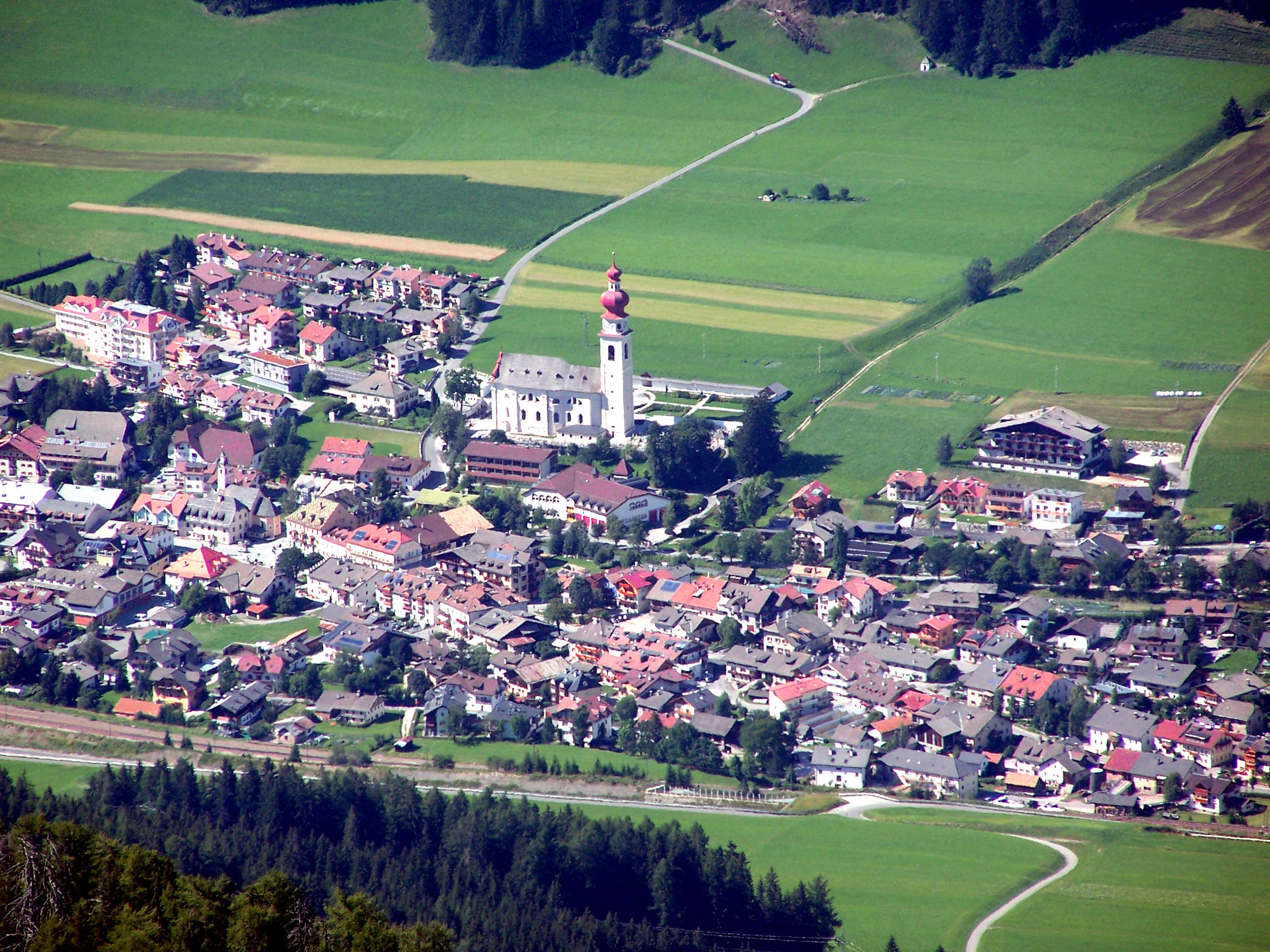
- View of Niederdorf

- Coat of arms

- Location within Italy Location within Trentino-Alto Adige/Südtirol
- Coordinates: 46°44′N 12°11′E
- Country: Italy
- Region: Trentino-Alto Adige/Südtirol
- Province: South Tyrol (BZ)

Government
  - Mayor: Günther Wisthaler

Area
  - Total: 17.8 km^{2} (6.9 sq mi)
- Elevation: 1,154 m (3,786 ft)

Population (Nov.2010)
  - Total: 1,469
  - Density: 82.5/km^{2} (214/sq mi)
- Demonym(s): German: Niederdorfer; Italian: Villabassino
- Time zone: UTC+1 (CET)
  - Summer (DST): UTC+2 (CEST)
- Postal code: 39039
- Dialing code: 0474
- Website: Official website

Niederdorf (German pronunciation: [ˈniːdɐdɔrf]; Italian: Villabassa [ˌvillaˈbassa]) is a municipality in South Tyrol in northern Italy, about 70 kilometres (43 mi) northeast of Bolzano.

== Geography ==
Niederdorf borders the following municipalities: Prags, Toblach, Welsberg-Taisten, and Gsies.

== History ==
The settlement is first mentioned as Nidrindorf in a record of the Freising bishopric, dating back to the years 993/94–1005.

=== Coat-of-arms ===
A fess, per fess gules, argent and gules (i.e. the Austrian flag), between:

1. in chief, Or, a sable eagle double-headed. This emblem was granted in 1966.
2. in base, per pale counterchanged and facing each other: Or, a half steinbock sable of Or and sable; and its mirror image. This is the insignia of the Lords of Kurz von Thurn who ruled the village from the 13th to the 18th century.

== Linguistic distribution ==
According to the 2024 census, 88.93% of the population speak German, 11.00% Italian and 0.07% Ladin as first language.

== External links (in German and Italian) ==
Media related to Niederdorf at Wikimedia Commons
