= Francesco Vitalini =

Italian painter (1865–1904)

- Born: 1865; Fiordimonte
- Died: 1904 (aged 38–39); Marmarole

Francesco Vitalini (1865–1904) was an Italian painter and engraver, active in depicting landscapes.

He was born in Fiordimonte in the region of Marche. He studied in Rome at the Institute of Fine Arts and then with Alessandro Morani at the Museo Industriale. He exhibited at the 1894–1897 Expositions of the Società Amatori e Cultori di Roma. He held exhibitions of his work in 1901 at the New Gallery in London and at the Salon of Paris in 1902. That year, he was invited by Adolfo Venturi to exhibit at the Gabinetto Nazionale delle Stampe of Rome.

He died from a fall in Gravasecca nelle Marmarole sulle Dolomiti, while he was climbing mountains by himself, making drawings of the Dolomite Alps.
