= Campanile Ciastelin =

Mountain in Italy

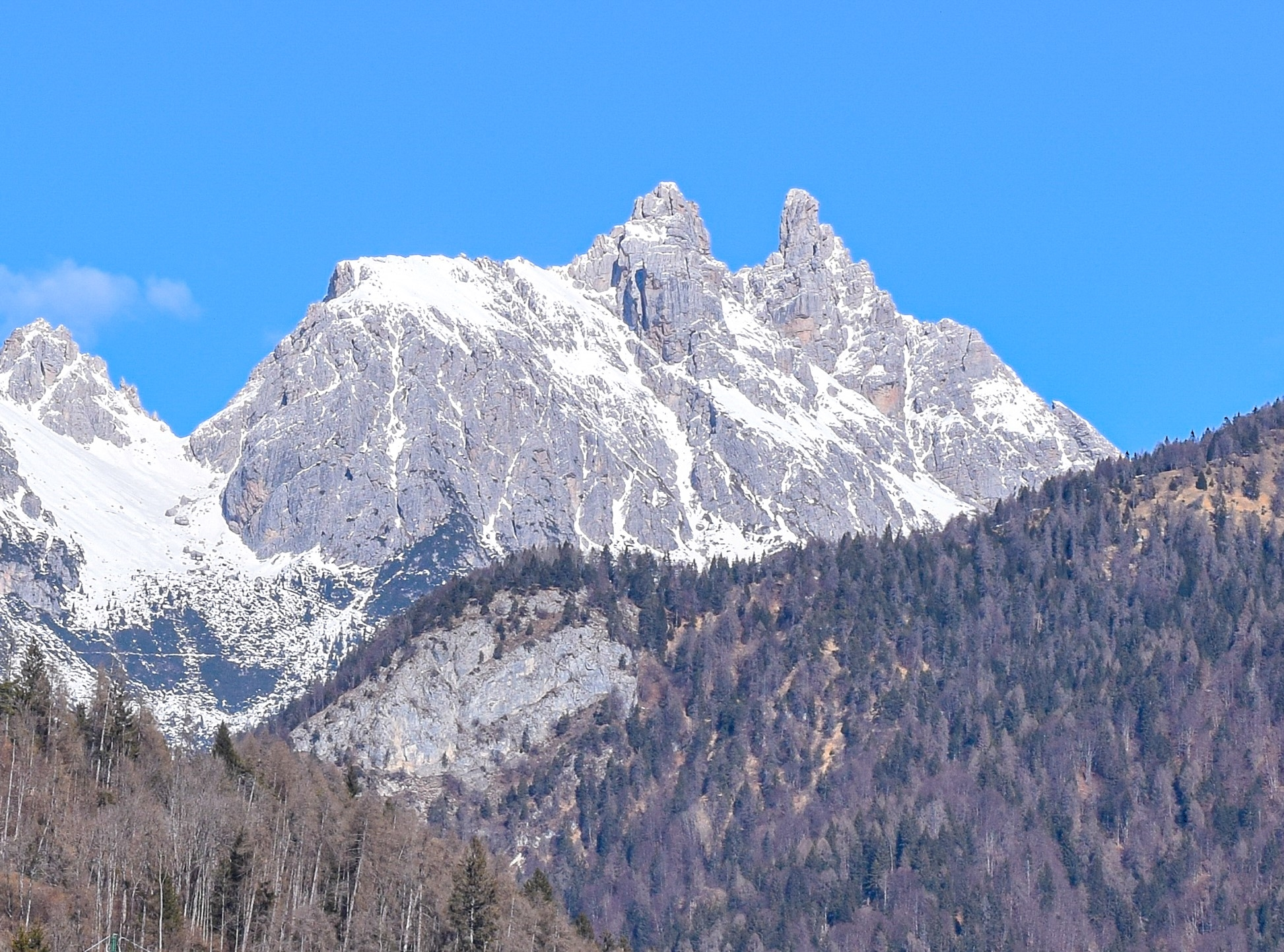
- Monte Ciastelin (2,570 m) centered Campanile Ciastelin to immediate right

Highest point
- Elevation: 2,602 m (8,537 ft)
- Prominence: 400 m (1,312 ft)
- Parent peak: Sorapiss
- Isolation: 2.09 km (1.30 mi)
- Listing: Prominent mountains of the Alps
- Coordinates: 46°30′39″N 12°22′37″E

Geography
- Location within Italy Location within Alps
- Interactive map of Campanile Ciastelin
- Country: Italy
- Province: Belluno
- Protected area: Dolomites World Heritage Site
- Parent range: Dolomites; Marmarole
- Topo map: Tabacco 016 Dolomiti del Centro Cadore

Geology
- Rock age: Triassic
- Rock type: Dolomite

Climbing
- First ascent: 1890

Campanile Ciastelin is a mountain in the province of Belluno in northern Italy.

== Description ==
Campanile Ciastelin is a 2,602-meter-elevation (8,537-foot) summit in the Marmarole group of the Dolomites, and as part of the Dolomites is a UNESCO World Heritage site. Set in the Veneto region, the peak is located five kilometers (3.1 miles) west-northwest of the municipality of Lozzo di Cadore and eight kilometers (5 miles) north of Pieve di Cadore. Precipitation runoff from the peak's slopes drains into tributaries of the Piave. Topographic relief is significant as the summit rises 900 meters (2,953 feet) along the northwest slope in one kilometer (0.6 mile), and 800 meters (2,625 feet) along the southeast slope in one kilometer. The nearest higher neighbor is Croda Bianca, 2.1 kilometers (1.3 miles) to the west-southwest. The first ascent of Campanile Ciastelin was accomplished on June 28, 1890, by Luigi Bernard, Ludwig Darmstädter, Hans Helversen, Veit Innerkofler, and Hans Stabeler via the northwest side. The mountain's toponym translates such that campanile (Italian) means "bell tower" and ciastelin (Ladin) means "little castle."

== Climate ==
Based on the Köppen climate classification, Campanile Ciastelin is located in an alpine climate zone with long, cold winters, and short, mild summers. Weather systems are forced upwards by the mountains (orographic lift), causing moisture to drop in the form of rain and snow. The months of June through September offer the most favorable weather for visiting or climbing in this area.

== Gallery ==
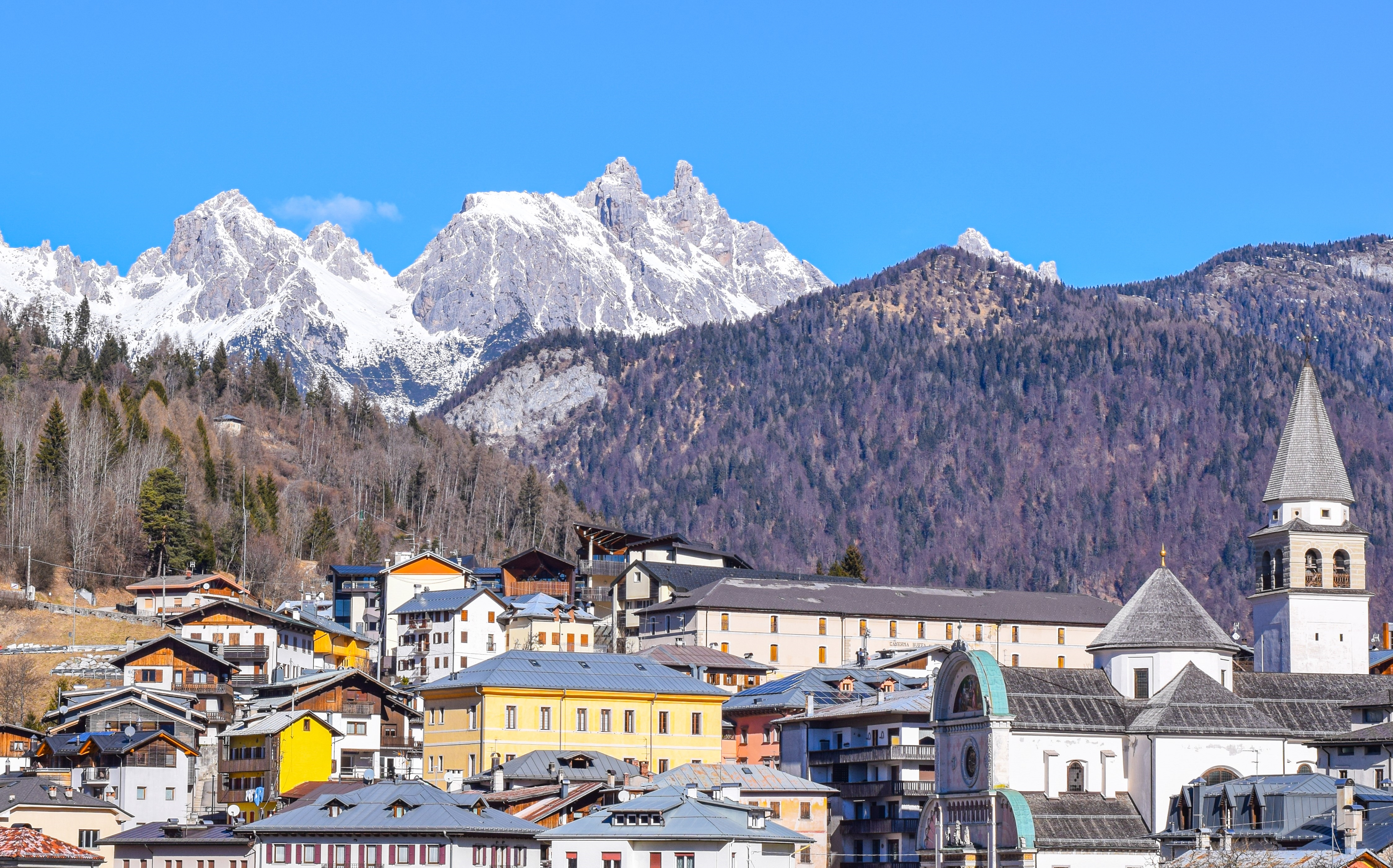
Campanile Ciastelin viewed from the south at Pieve di Cadore

== See also ==
- Southern Limestone Alps
