= Punta Nera (Dolomites) =

Mountain in Italy

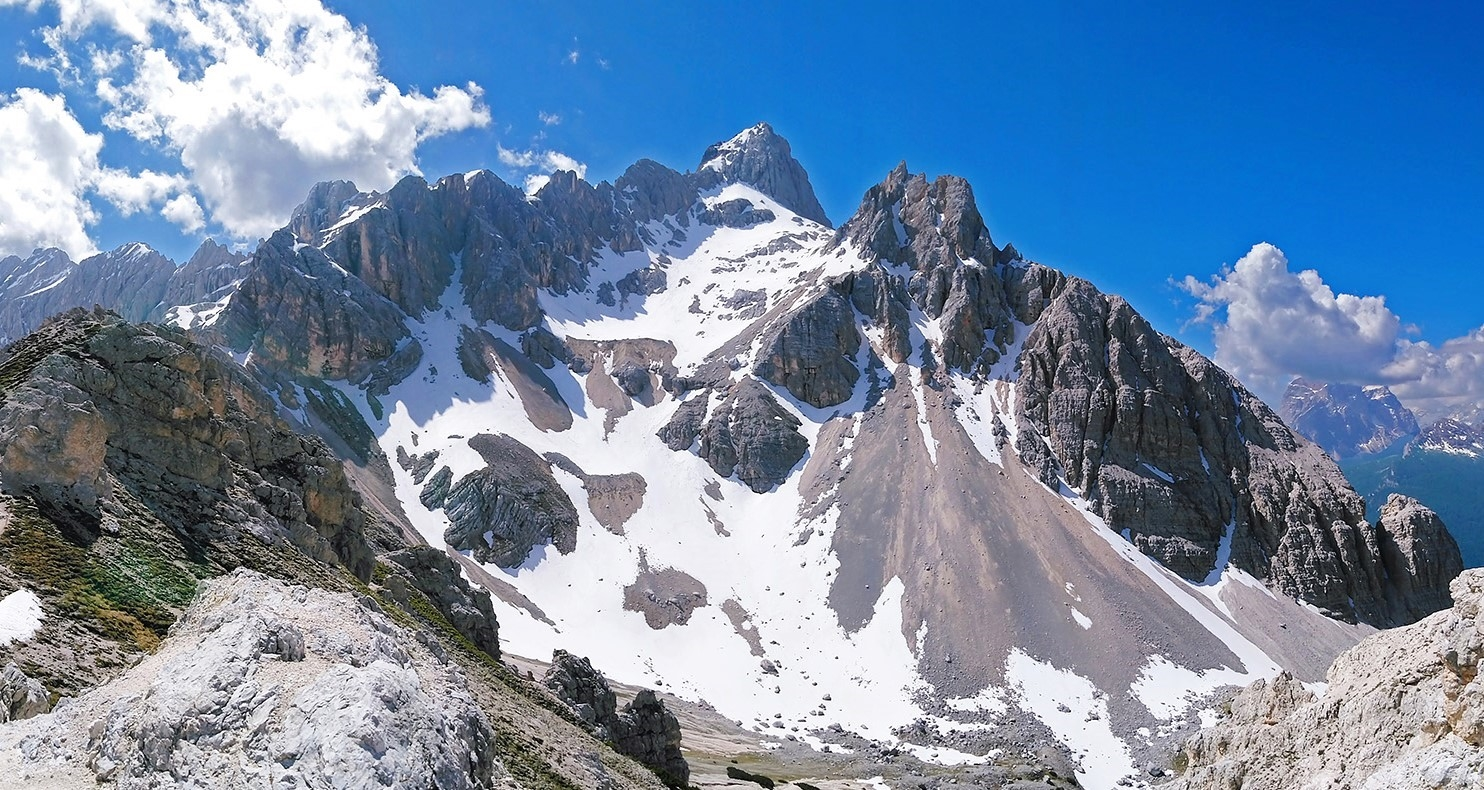
- North aspect

Highest point
- Elevation: 2,847 m (9,341 ft)
- Prominence: 431 m (1,414 ft)
- Parent peak: Sorapiss
- Isolation: 1.77 km (1.10 mi)
- Coordinates: 46°30′59″N 12°11′30″E

Geography
- Location within Italy Location within Alps
- Interactive map of Punta Nera
- Country: Italy
- Province: Belluno
- Protected area: Dolomites World Heritage Site
- Parent range: Dolomites; Ampezzo Dolomites
- Topo map: Tabacco 03 Cortina d’Ampezzo e Dolomiti Ampezzane

Geology
- Rock age: Triassic
- Rock type: Dolomite

Climbing
- First ascent: 1876

Punta Nera is a mountain in the province of Belluno in northern Italy.

== Description ==
Punta Nera is a 2,847-meter-elevation (9,341-foot) summit in the Dolomites, and as part of the Dolomites is a UNESCO World Heritage site. Set in the Veneto region, the peak is located four kilometers (2.5 miles) southeast of the town of Cortina d'Ampezzo. Precipitation runoff from the mountain's slopes drains into tributaries of the Piave. Topographic relief is significant as the summit rises 1,750 meters (5,741 feet) above the Boite Valley in 2.5 kilometers (1.55 miles). The mountain's toponym translates from Italian as "Black Peak." The nearest higher neighbor is Sorapiss, 1.77 kilometers (1.1 miles) to the southeast.

== Climate ==
Based on the Köppen climate classification, Punta Nera is located in an alpine climate zone with long, cold winters, and short, mild summers. Weather systems are forced upwards by the mountains (orographic lift), causing moisture to drop in the form of rain and snow. The months of June through September offer the most favorable weather for visiting or climbing in this area.

== Gallery ==
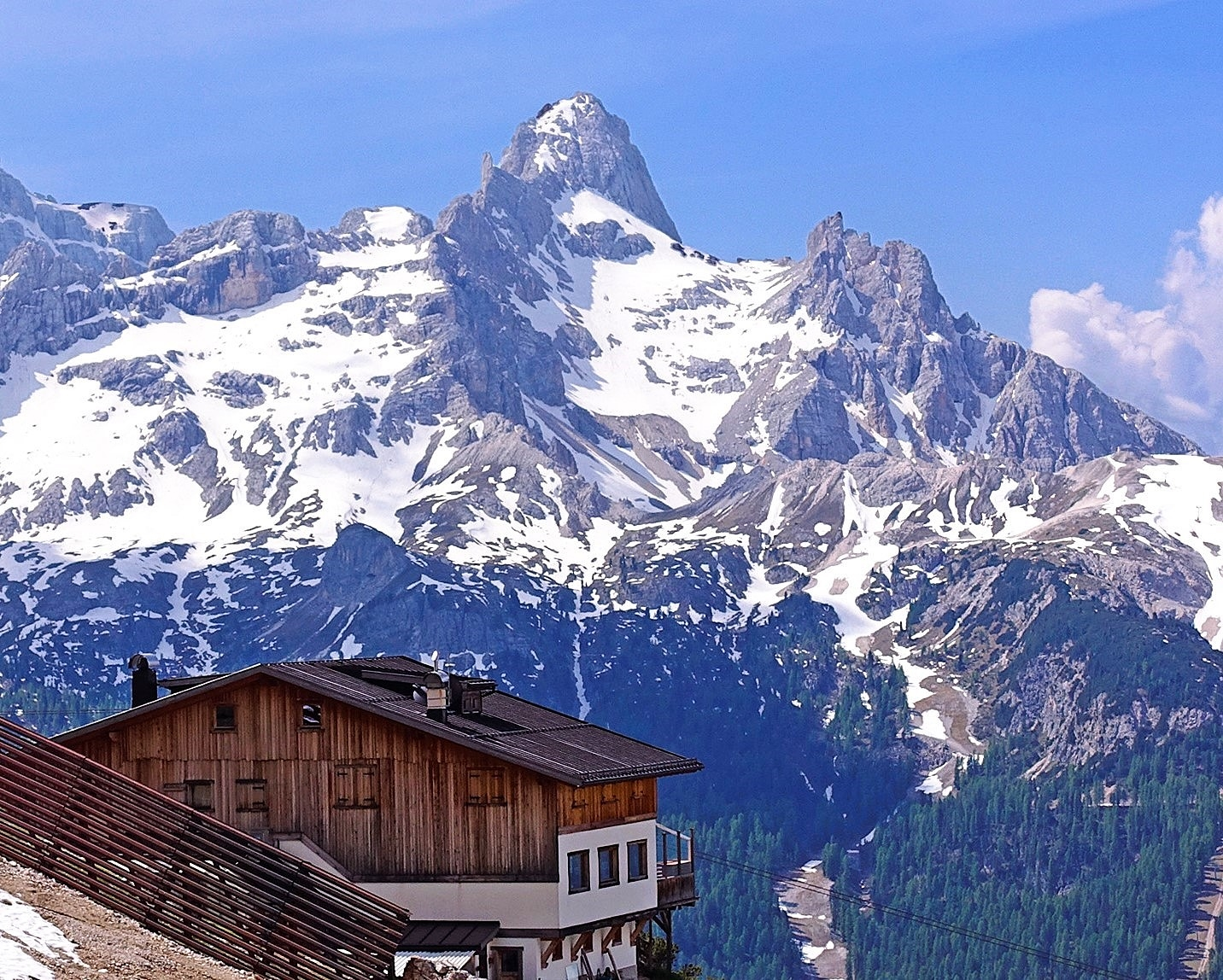
North aspect

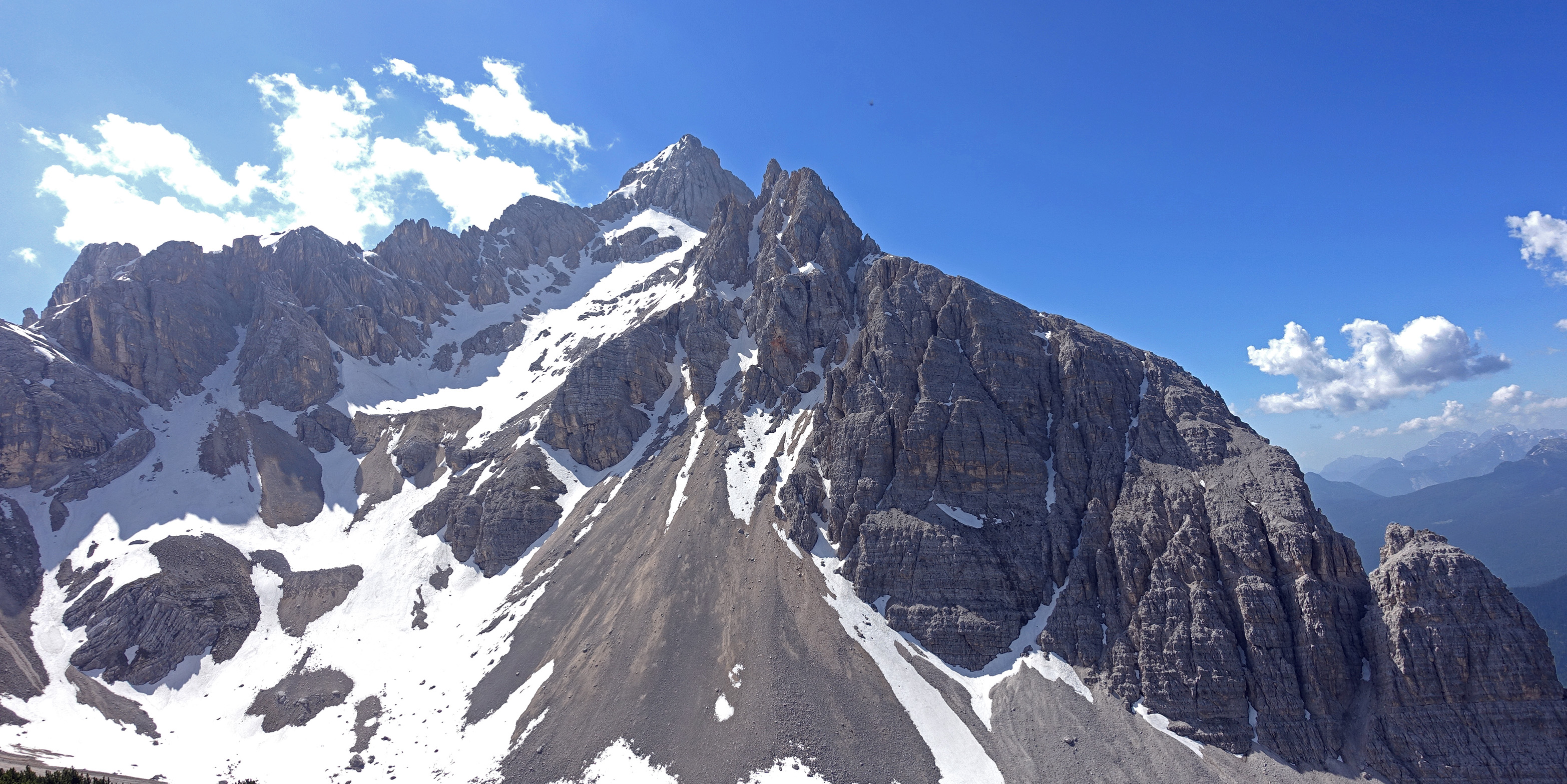
North aspect

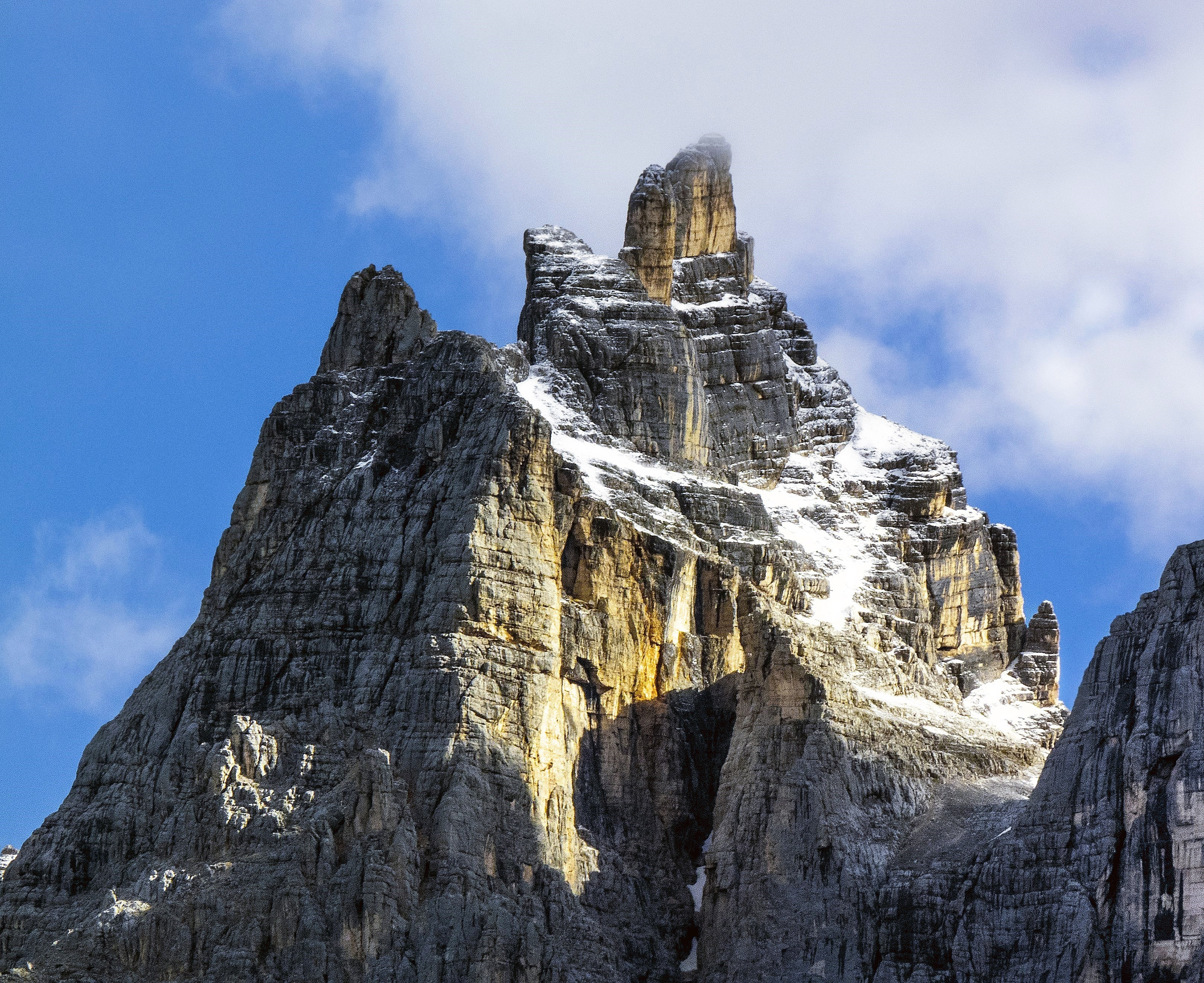
South end of Punta Nera's south ridge

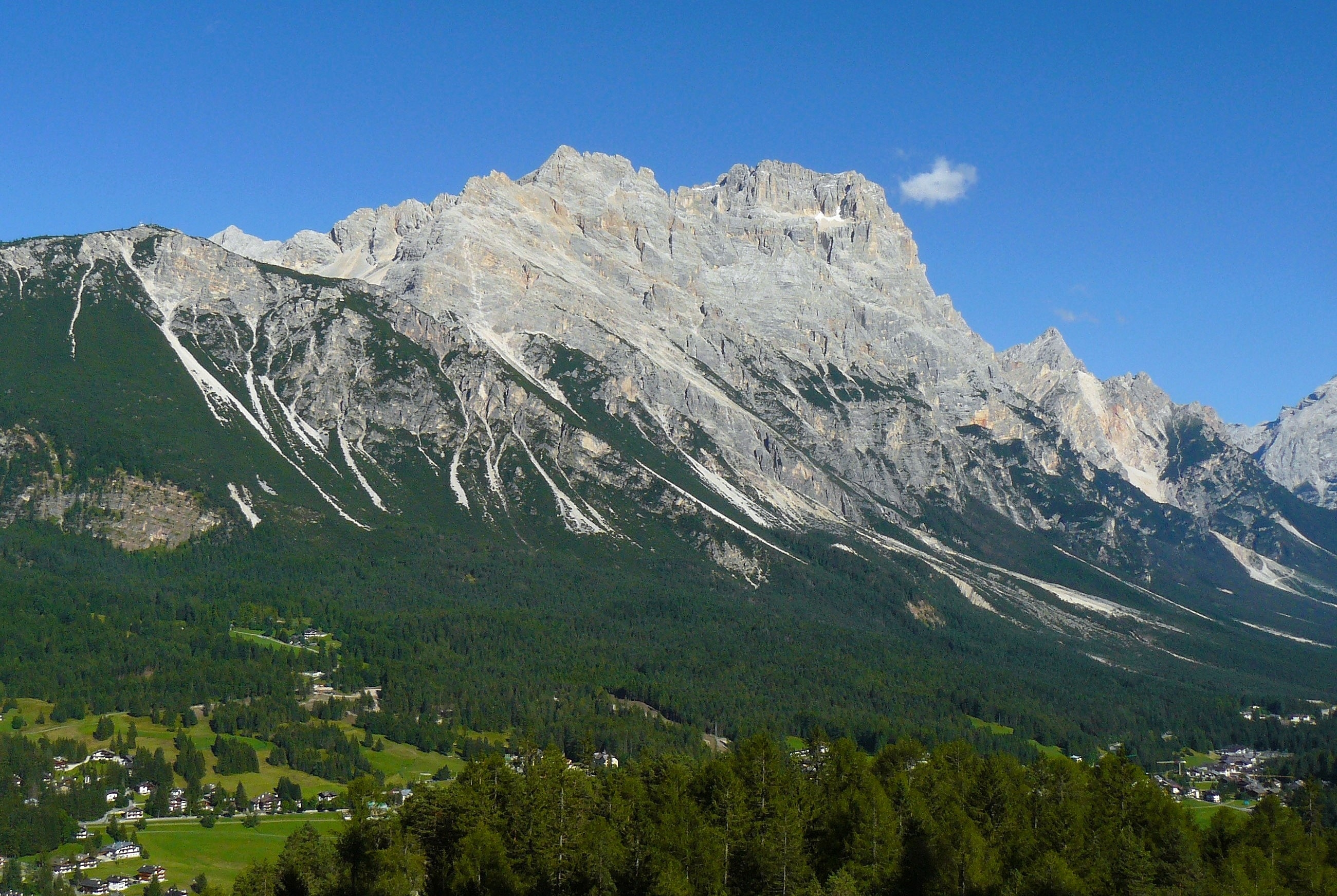
Punta Nera and Sorapiss

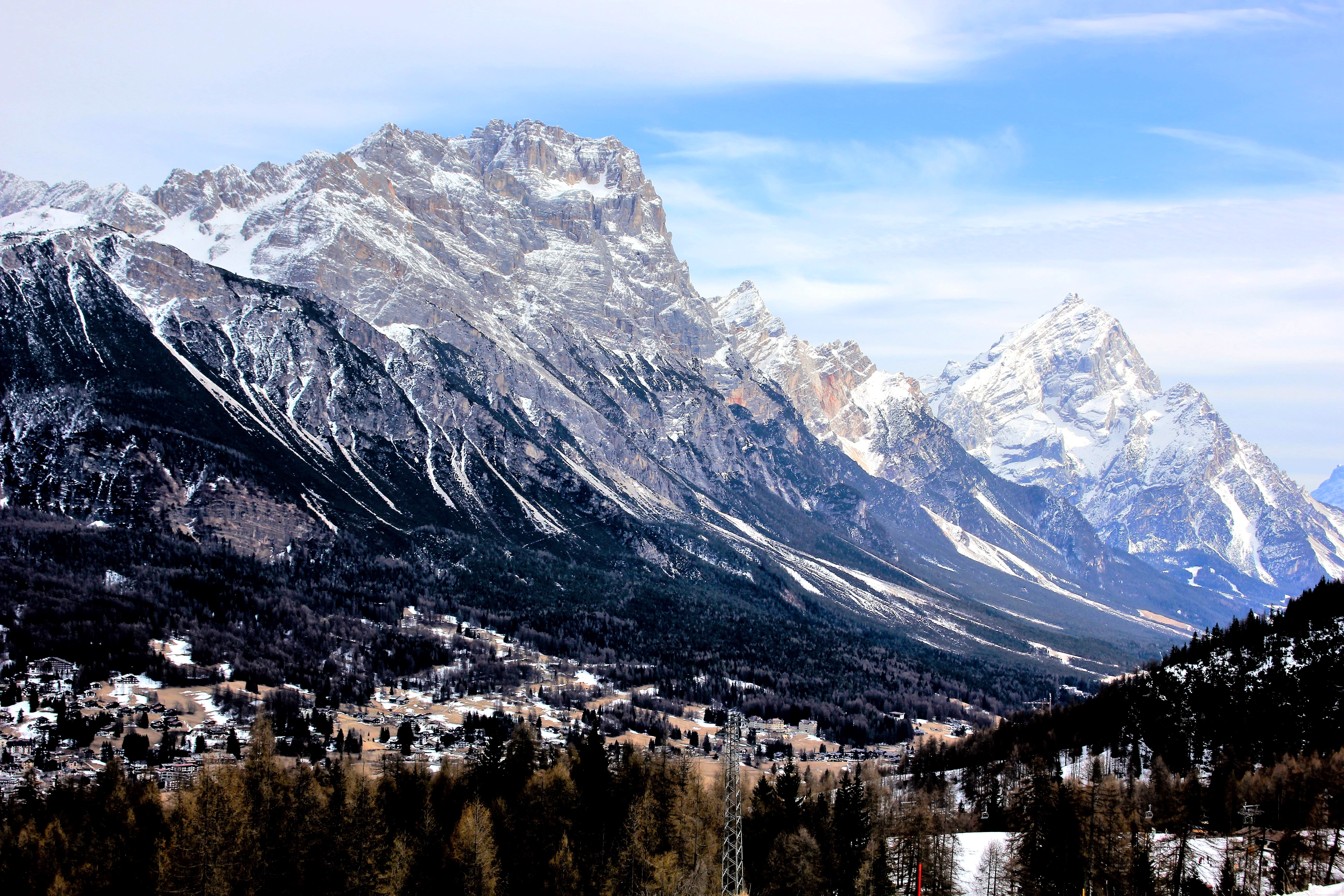
Punta Nera, Sorapiss, Cima Belprà, Antelao, with Cortina d'Ampezzo below

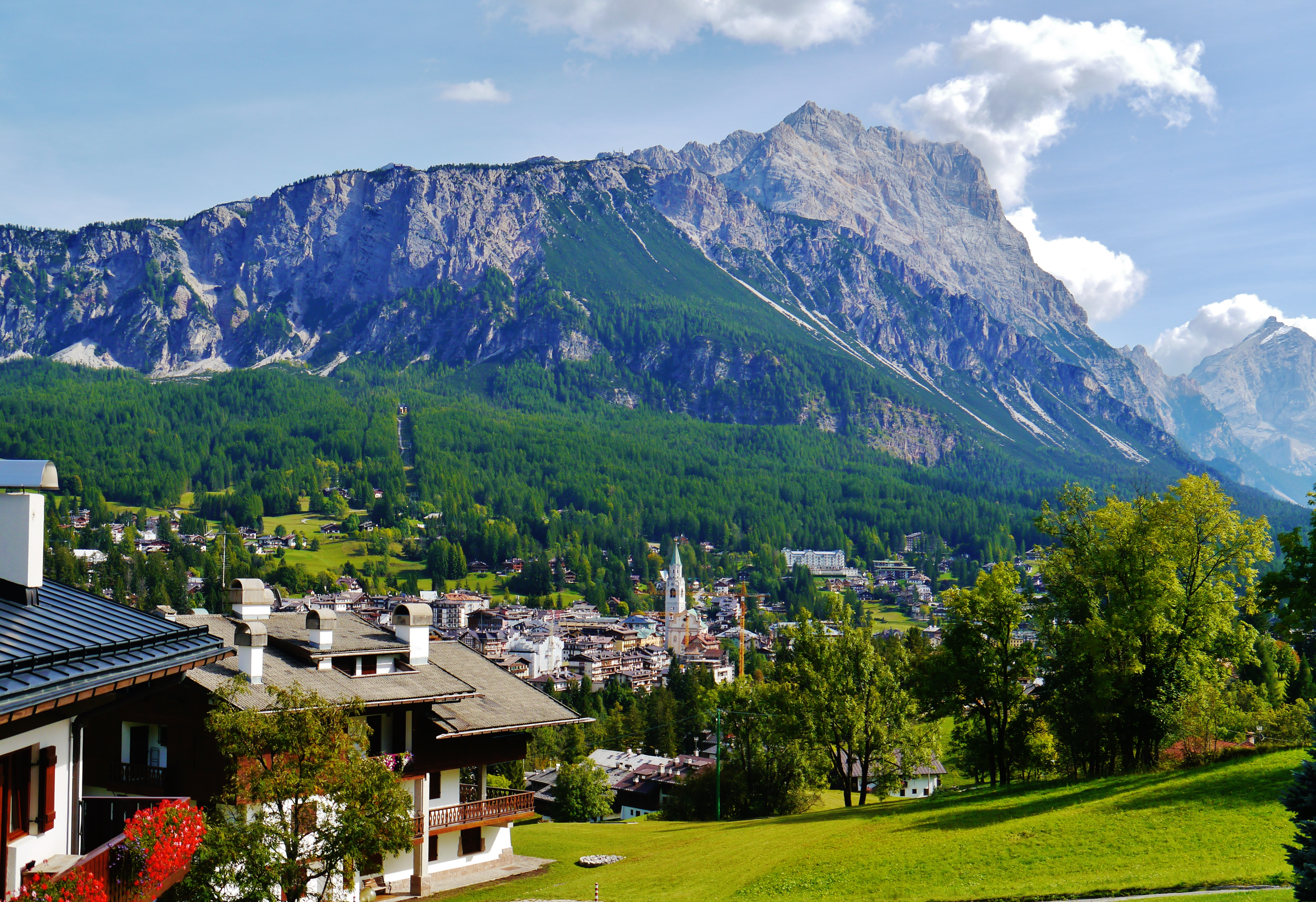
Punta Nera appears as the high point as seen from Cortina d'Ampezzo. Sorapiss directly behind.

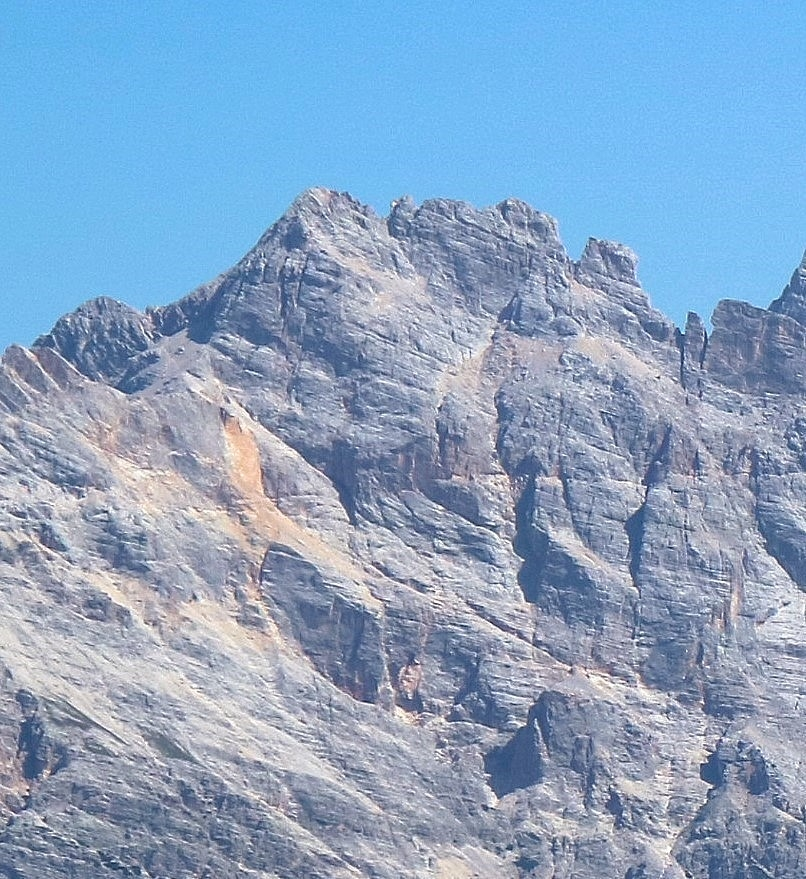
West aspect

== See also ==
- Southern Limestone Alps
