= San Francesco, Valfornace =

Church in Valfornace, Italy

Coordinates: 43°04′35″N 13°04′42″E

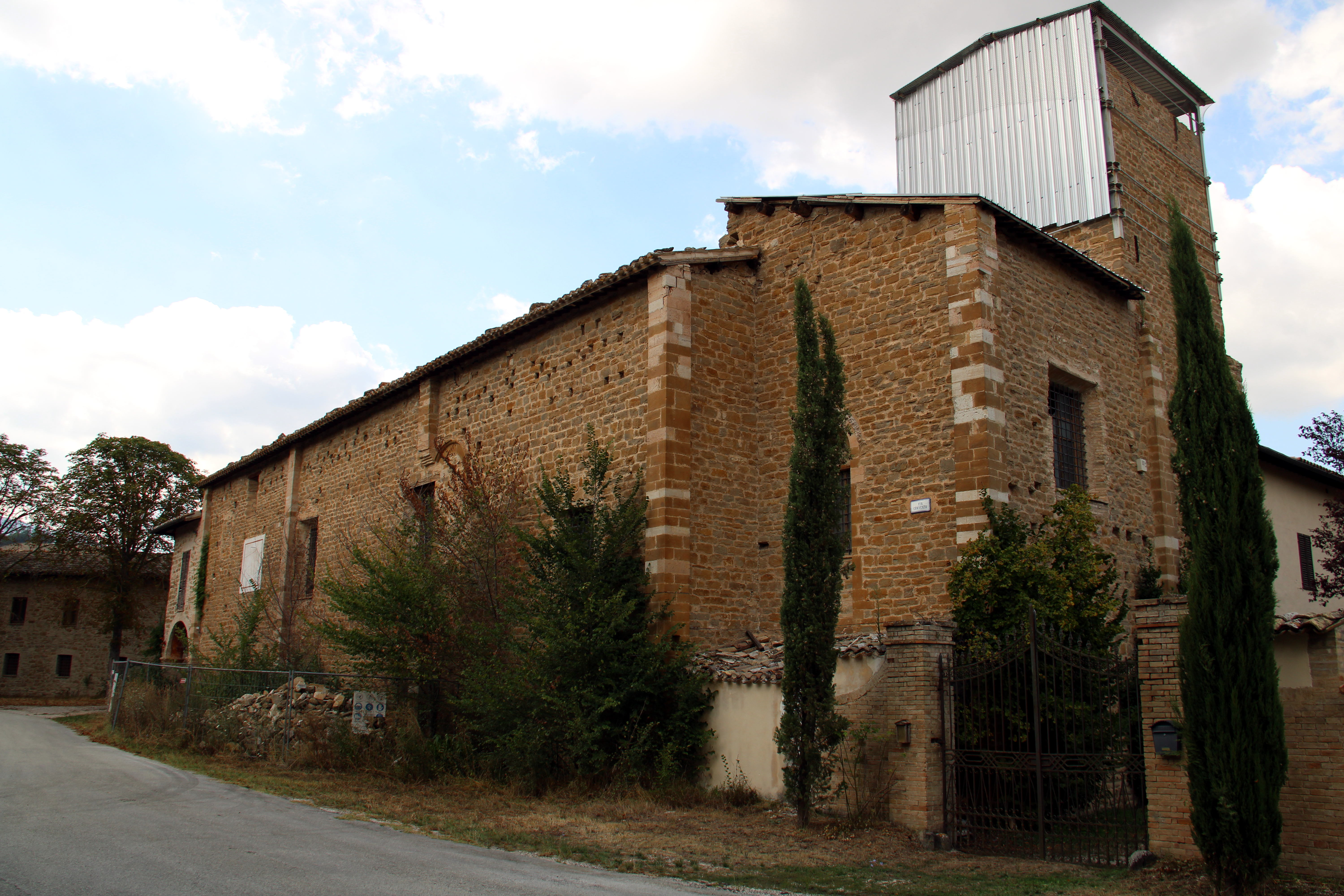
Cammino Francescano della Marca, Valfornace, Pievebovigliana, Convento

San Francesco is a Roman Catholic church and convent located inside the municipality of Valfornace, province of Macerata, region of Marche, Italy.

== History ==
The church was erected in 14th century, but along with the adjacent convent, underwent many reconstructions. Beyond the apse rises a belltower. The church has corner buttresses and has a trussed wooden roof, and has a 19th-century copy of the venerated Crucifix of San Damiano di Assisi. Tradition holds that this church once held the original, but that it was destroyed by a fire in 1892. The church has a single nave with lateral altars. Restorations in the 20th century uncovered frescoes in the apse and nave walls attributed to Cola di Pietro. A fresco depicting the Madonna della Misericordia is attributed to Girolamo Di Giovanni di Camerino.

The church of San Francesco in 1824 was annexed to a "country casino" owned by the Conforti nobili di Camerino family (1), it was accessible directly from inside the farmhouse/villa through the entrance located in the bell tower/sacristy.

On August 23, 1824, Antonio Conforti, nobleman of Camerino, married to Agnese De Angelis, who after his death had the Notary Domenico Melchiorri of Camerino dimine a detailed inventory of the assets of both the farmhouse/villa and the church that was public but still remained the property of the Conforti family.
