= Santa Maria Maddalena, Pievebovigliana =

Church in Macerata Province, Italy

Coordinates: 43°05′46.86″N 13°11′19.97″E

Santa Maria Maddalena is a rural and rustic, Romanesque-style, Roman Catholic church located outside the town of Pievebovigliana, province of Macerata, region of Marche, Italy.

== History ==
The church is a simple rectangular stone structure with thick internal pilasters on a hill of the same name. The exterior almost lacks any decoration: the portal is made of rounded stone with a single narrow window above. There are no windows in the nave. The interior has highly deteriorated frescoes depicting a crucifix, a Magdalen, and some angels attributed to Cola Di Pietro.
