= Cola di Pietro =

Italian painter

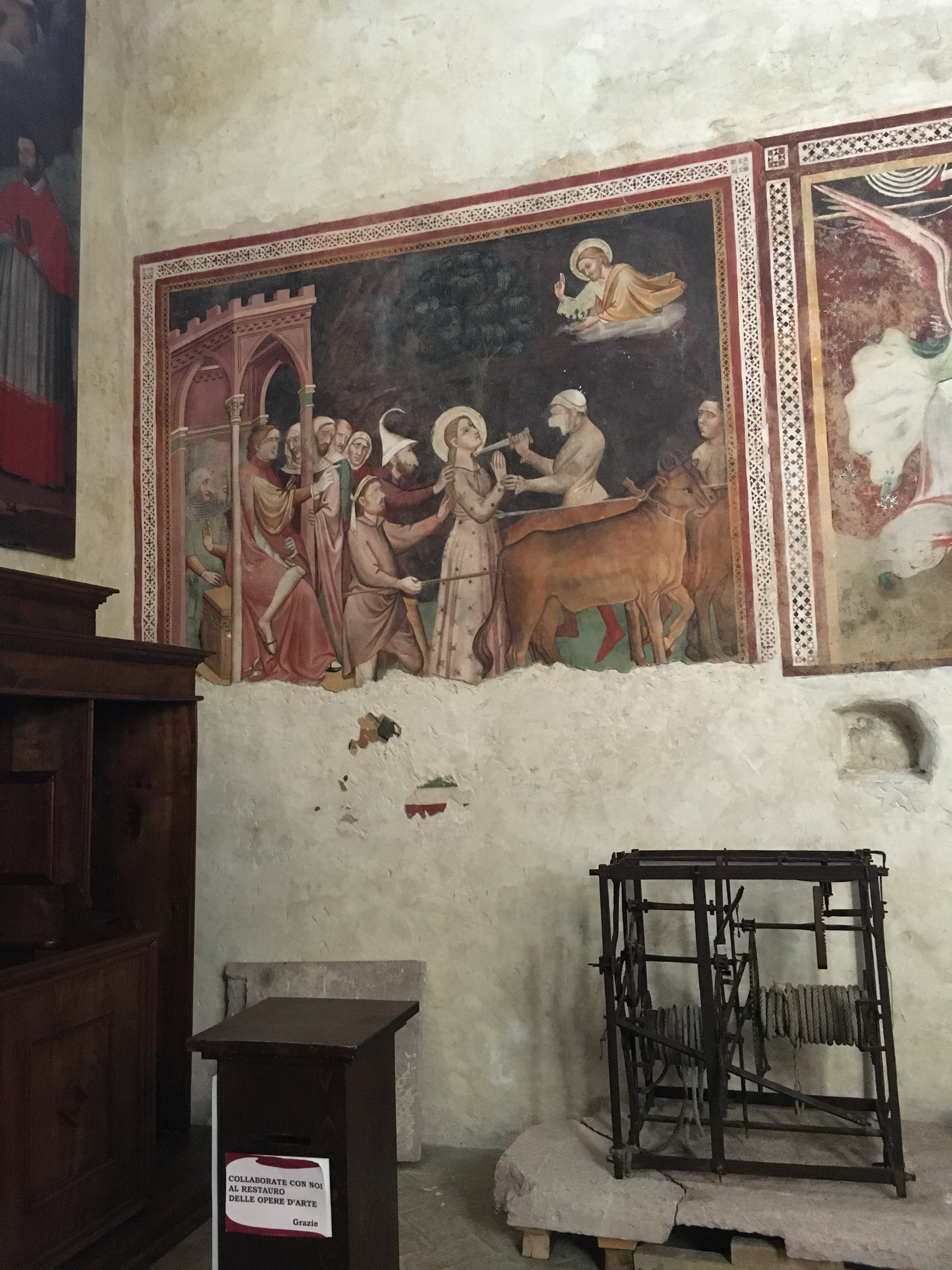
Martyrdom of St Lucy, fresco in Santa Maria Assunta in Vallo di Nera

Cola di Pietro (active late 14th-century) was an Italian painter, active in the Marche and Umbria regions in a late Gothic style.

Almost no biographical information is available. He was likely born in Camerino. It is not stated if he was associated with the early 15th-century painter from Camerino, Arcangelo di Cola, who painted in Tuscany and the Lazio. Frescoes attributed to Cola di Pietro are found in the churches of San Francesco and Santa Maria Maddalenain Pievebovigliana.

Other works

- Frescoes in the church of Santa Maria a Vallo di Nera, Umbria
- Frescoes in Pievetorna parish in the province of Macerata, Marche
