= Cima Bastioni =

Mountain in Italy

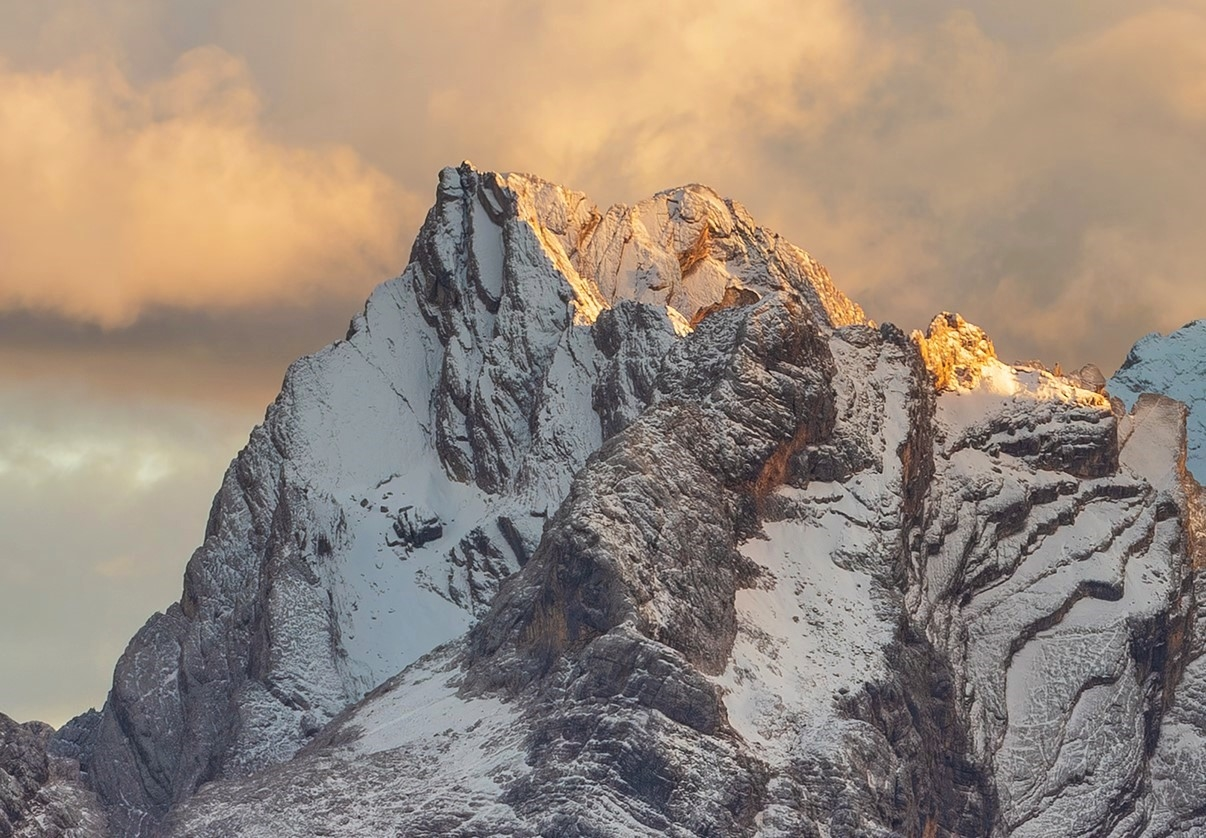
- North aspect

Highest point
- Elevation: 2,926 m (9,600 ft)
- Prominence: 557 m (1,827 ft)
- Parent peak: Cimon del Froppa
- Isolation: 3.7 km (2.3 mi)
- Coordinates: 46°29′07″N 12°16′05″E

Geography
- Location within Italy
- Interactive map of Cima Bastioni
- Country: Italy
- Province: Belluno
- Protected area: Dolomites World Heritage Site
- Parent range: Dolomites; Marmarole Group
- Topo map(s): Tabacco 025 Dolomiti di Zoldo, Cadorine e Agordine

Geology
- Rock age: Triassic
- Rock type: Dolomite

Climbing
- First ascent: 1890

Cima Bastioni is a mountain in the province of Belluno in northern Italy.

== Description ==
Cima Bastioni, labeled as Cima Bastion on the official IGM map, is a 2,926-meter-elevation (9,600-foot) summit in the Marmarole Group of the Dolomites, and as part of the Dolomites is a UNESCO World Heritage site. Set in the Veneto region, the peak is located five kilometers (3.1 miles) northeast of the town of San Vito di Cadore. Precipitation runoff from the mountain's slopes drains into tributaries of the Piave. Topographic relief is significant as the summit rises 1,200 meters (3,937 feet) above Torrente Oten in one kilometer (0.6 mile). The nearest higher neighbor is Punte Tre Sorelle, 3.7 kilometers (2.3 miles) to the northwest. The mountain's descriptive toponym translates from Italian as "Bastions Peak."

== Climate ==
Based on the Köppen climate classification, Cima Bastioni is located in an alpine climate zone with long, cold winters, and short, mild summers. Weather systems are forced upwards by the mountains (orographic lift), causing moisture to drop in the form of rain and snow. The months of June through September offer the most favorable weather for visiting or climbing in this area.

== Gallery ==
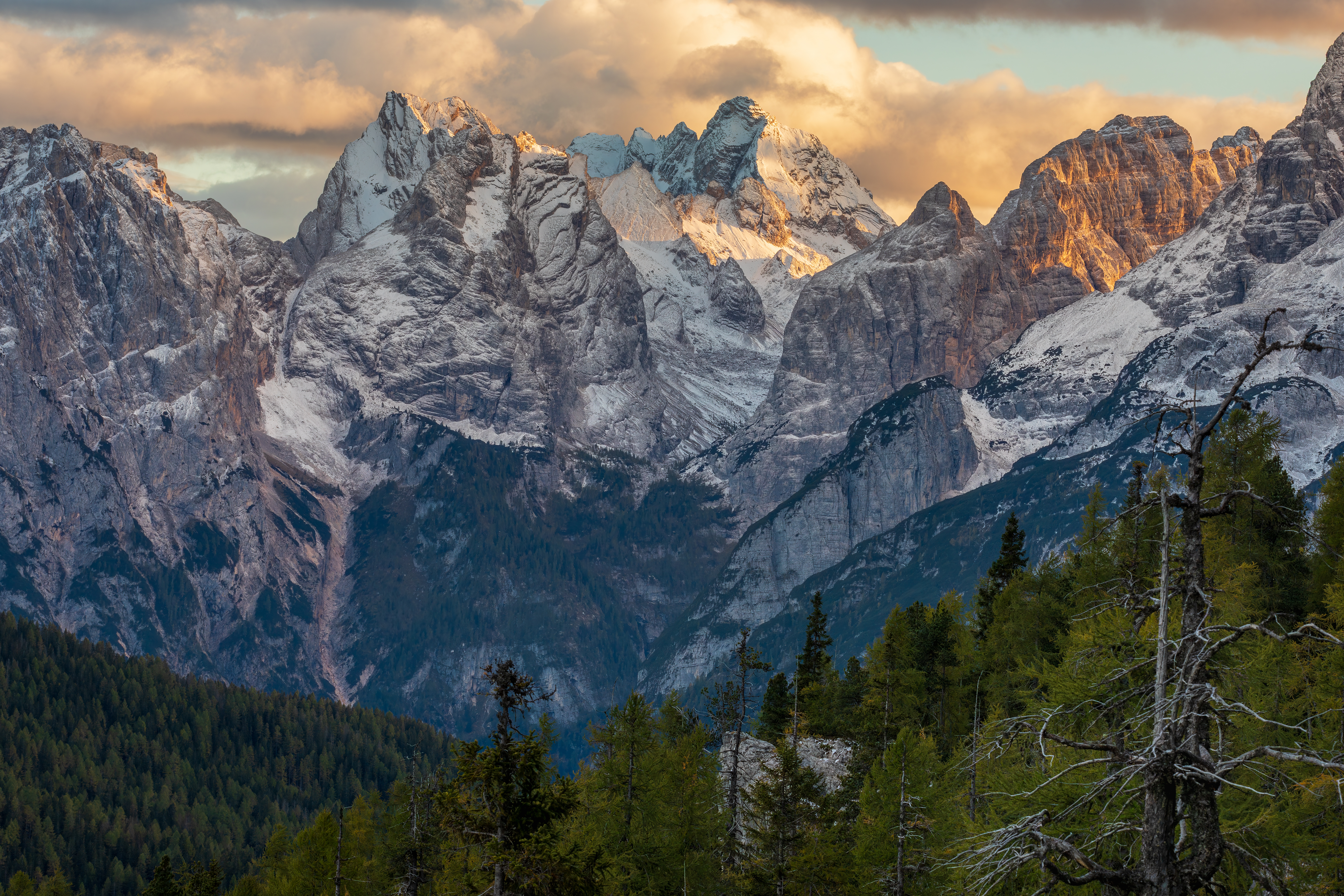
Antelao centered with Cima Bastioni to left

== See also ==
- Southern Limestone Alps
