= Cima Belprà =

Mountain in Italy

- Cima Bel Pra
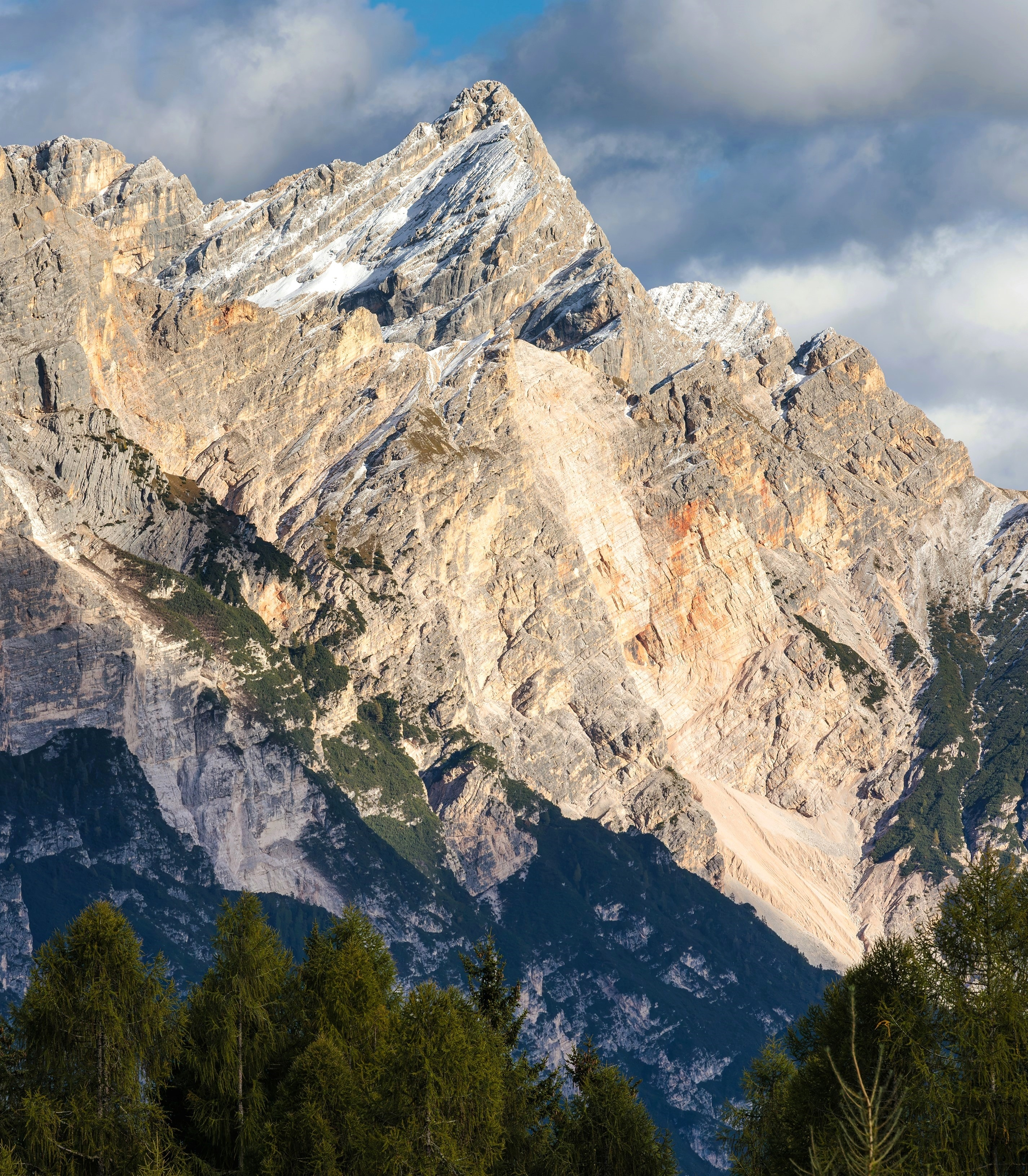
- West aspect

Highest point
- Elevation: 2,917 m (9,570 ft)
- Prominence: 447 m (1,467 ft)
- Parent peak: Cima Bastioni
- Isolation: 2.09 km (1.30 mi)
- Coordinates: 46°29′04″N 12°14′29″E

Geography
- Location within Italy Location within Alps
- Interactive map of Cima Belprà
- Country: Italy
- Province: Belluno
- Protected area: Dolomites World Heritage Site
- Parent range: Dolomites; Marmarole Group
- Topo map: Tabacco 03 Cortina d’Ampezzo e Dolomiti Ampezzane

Geology
- Rock age: Triassic
- Rock type: Dolomite

Climbing
- First ascent: 1880

Cima Belprà is a mountain in the province of Belluno in northern Italy.

== Description ==
Cima Belprà, labeled as Cima Bel Pra on the official IGM map, is a 2,917-meter-elevation (9,570-foot) summit in the Marmarole Group of the Dolomites, and as part of the Dolomites is a UNESCO World Heritage site. Set in the Veneto region, the peak is located 3.25 kilometers (2 miles) northeast of the town of San Vito di Cadore. Precipitation runoff from the mountain's slopes drains into tributaries of the Piave. Topographic relief is significant as the summit rises 1,900 meters (6,233 feet) above the Boite Valley in three kilometers (1.86 miles). The mountain's toponym translates from Italian as "Peak of the Beautiful Meadow." The nearest higher neighbor is Cima Bastioni, 2.1 kilometers (1.3 miles) to the east.

== Climbing history ==
The first ascent of the summit was made on September 4, 1880, by Carlo Brandolini, Luigi Cesaletti, Luigi Pitacco, and Antonio Zanucco via the east-northeast side. The southwest side and south ridge was first climbed on August 17, 1899, by Arcangelo Dibona, Pietro Dimai, Arcangelo Siorpaes, Ernestine and Otto Lecher.

== Climate ==
Based on the Köppen climate classification, Cima Belprà is located in an alpine climate zone with long, cold winters, and short, mild summers. Weather systems are forced upwards by the mountains (orographic lift), causing moisture to drop in the form of rain and snow. The months of June through September offer the most favorable weather for visiting or climbing in this area.

== Gallery ==
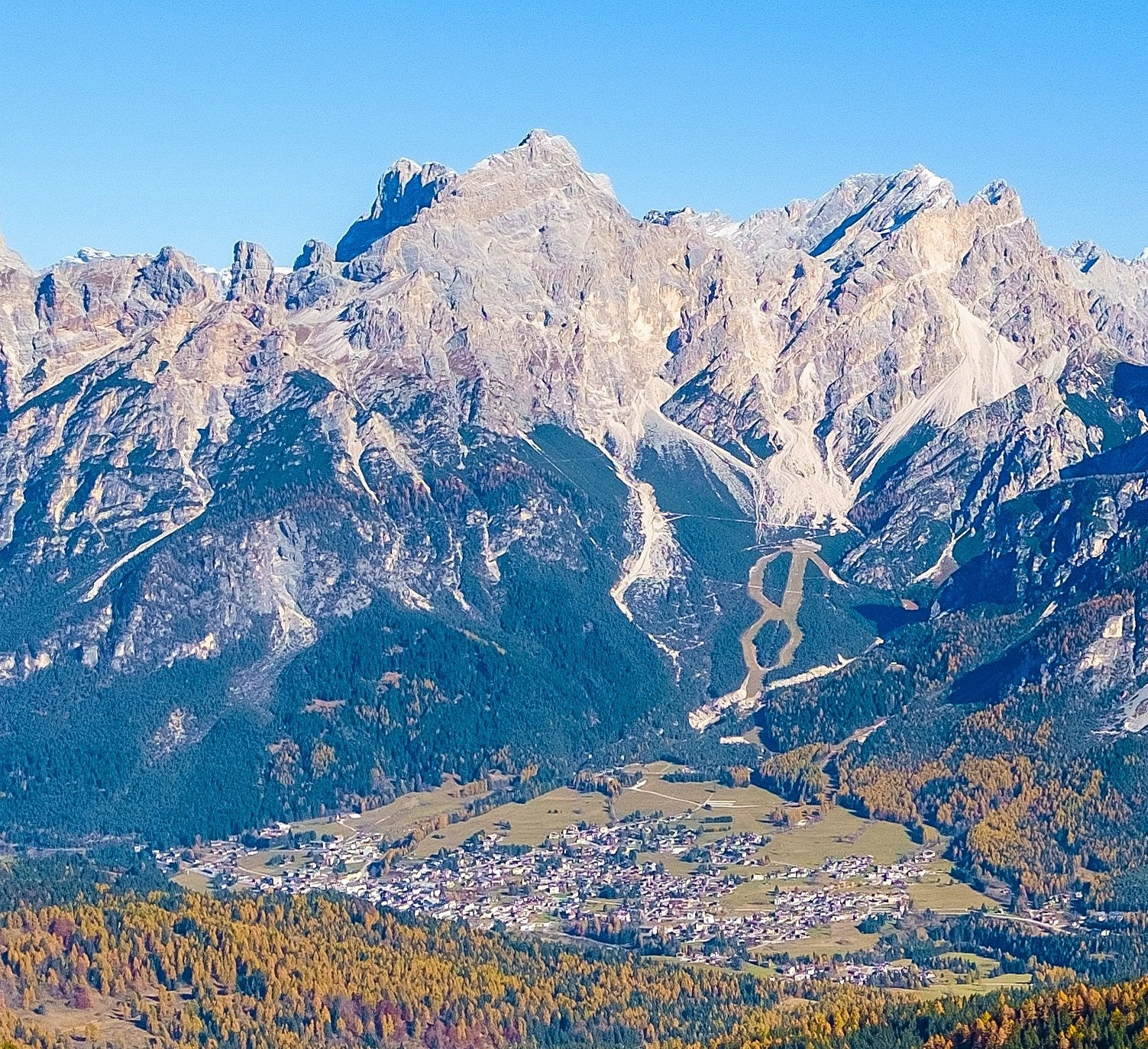
Southwest aspect of Cima Belprà rises above the town of San Vito di Cadore

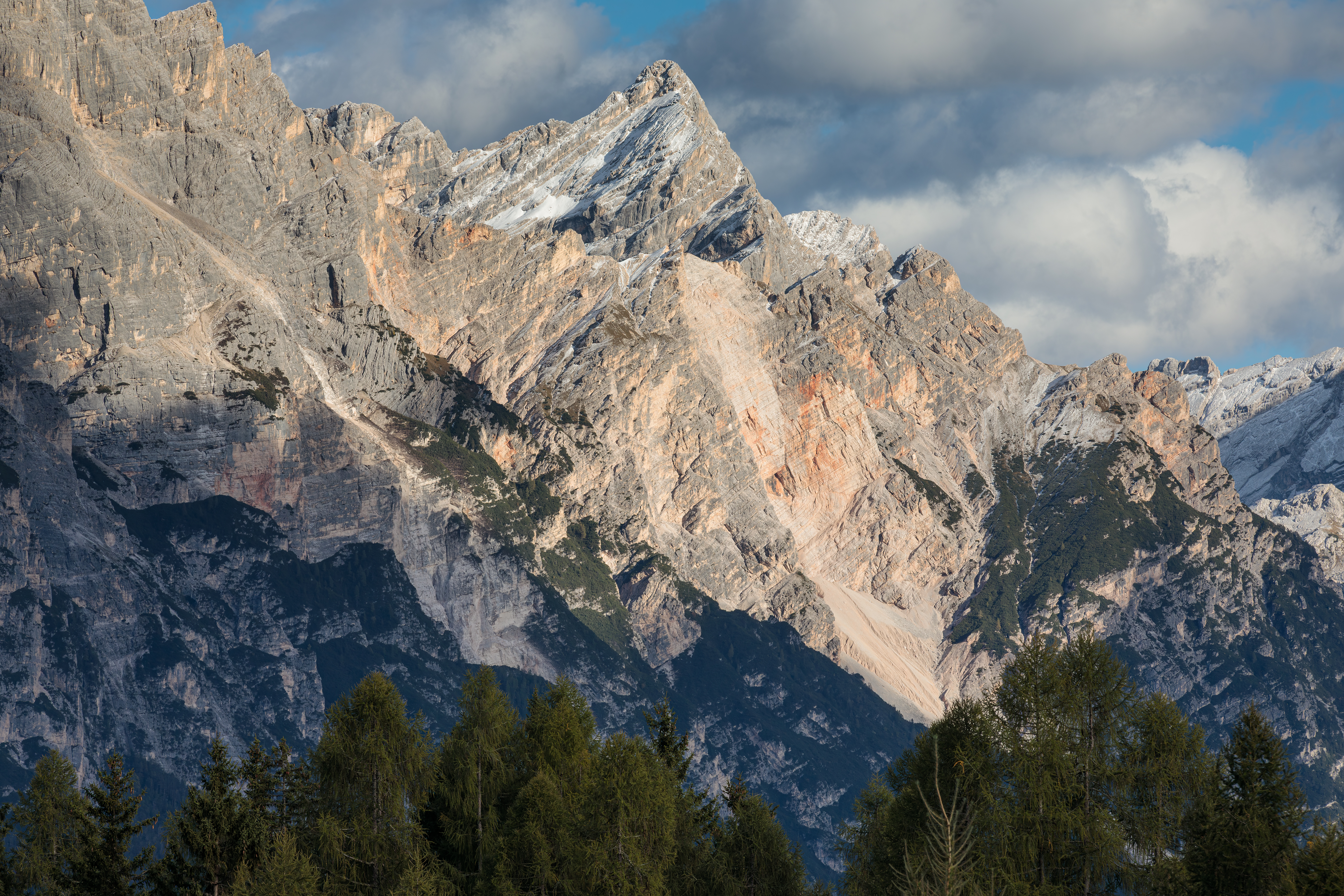
West aspect

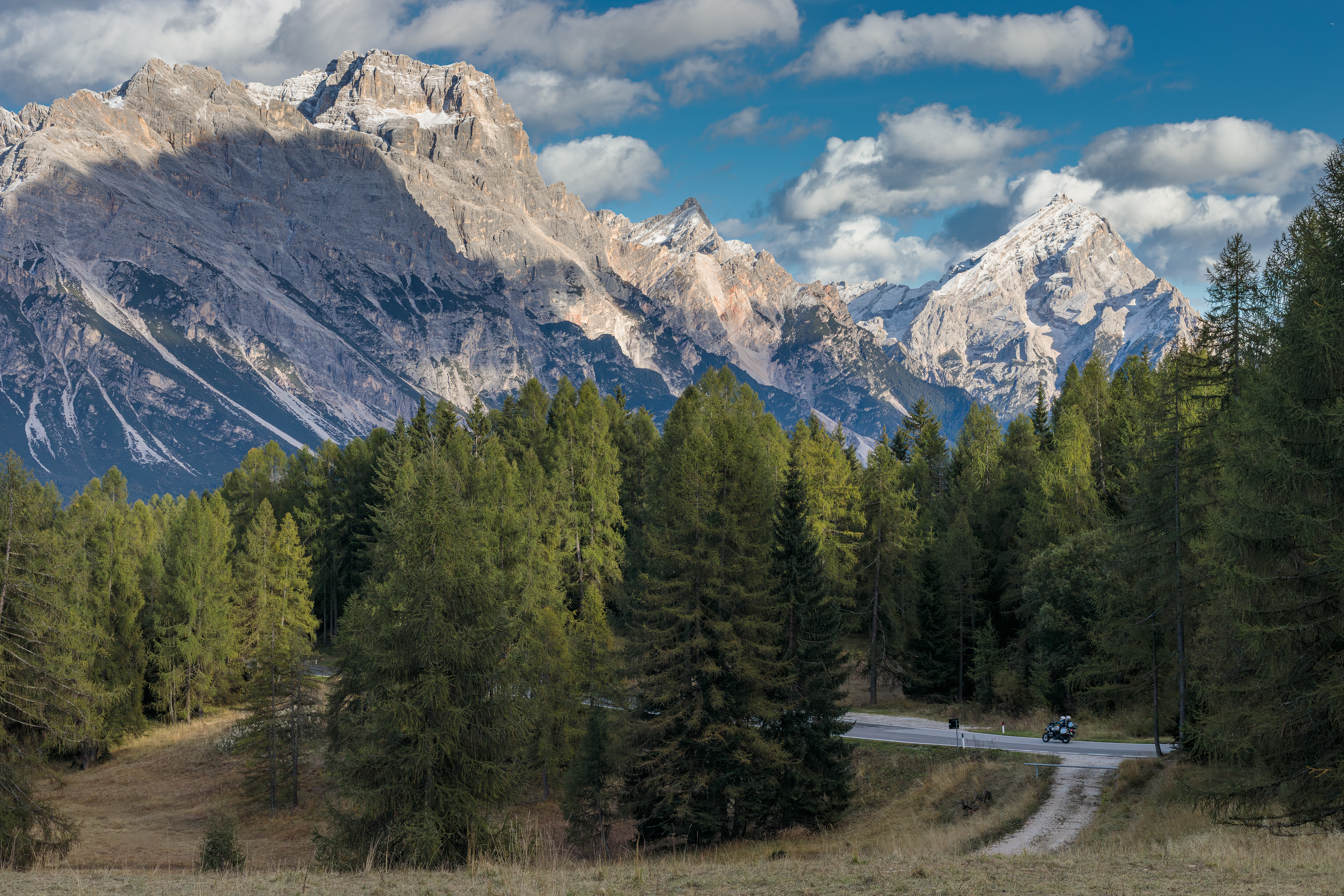
Sorapiss (left), Cima Belprà (center), and Antelao (right)

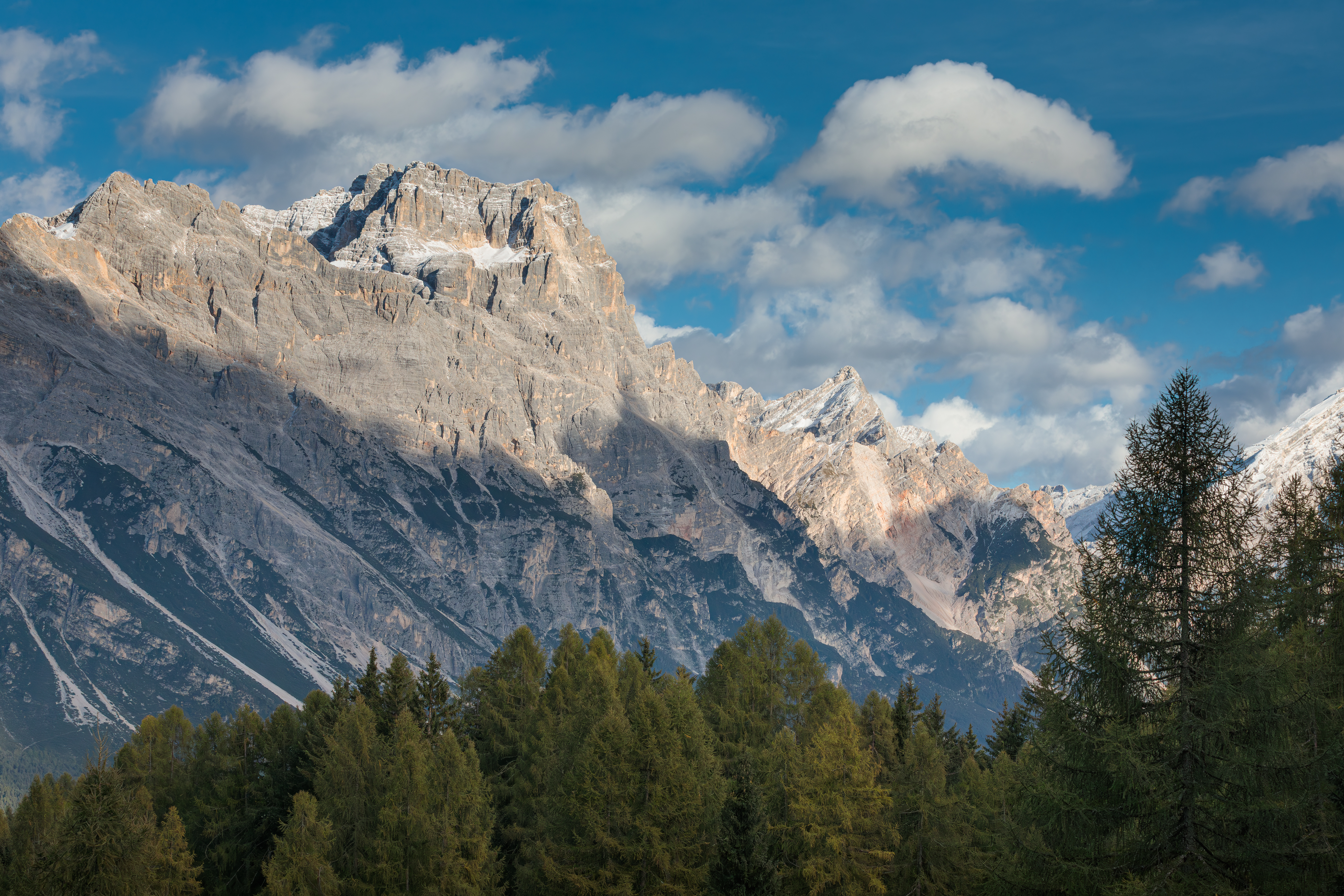
Sorapiss (left) and Cima Belprà (right of center)

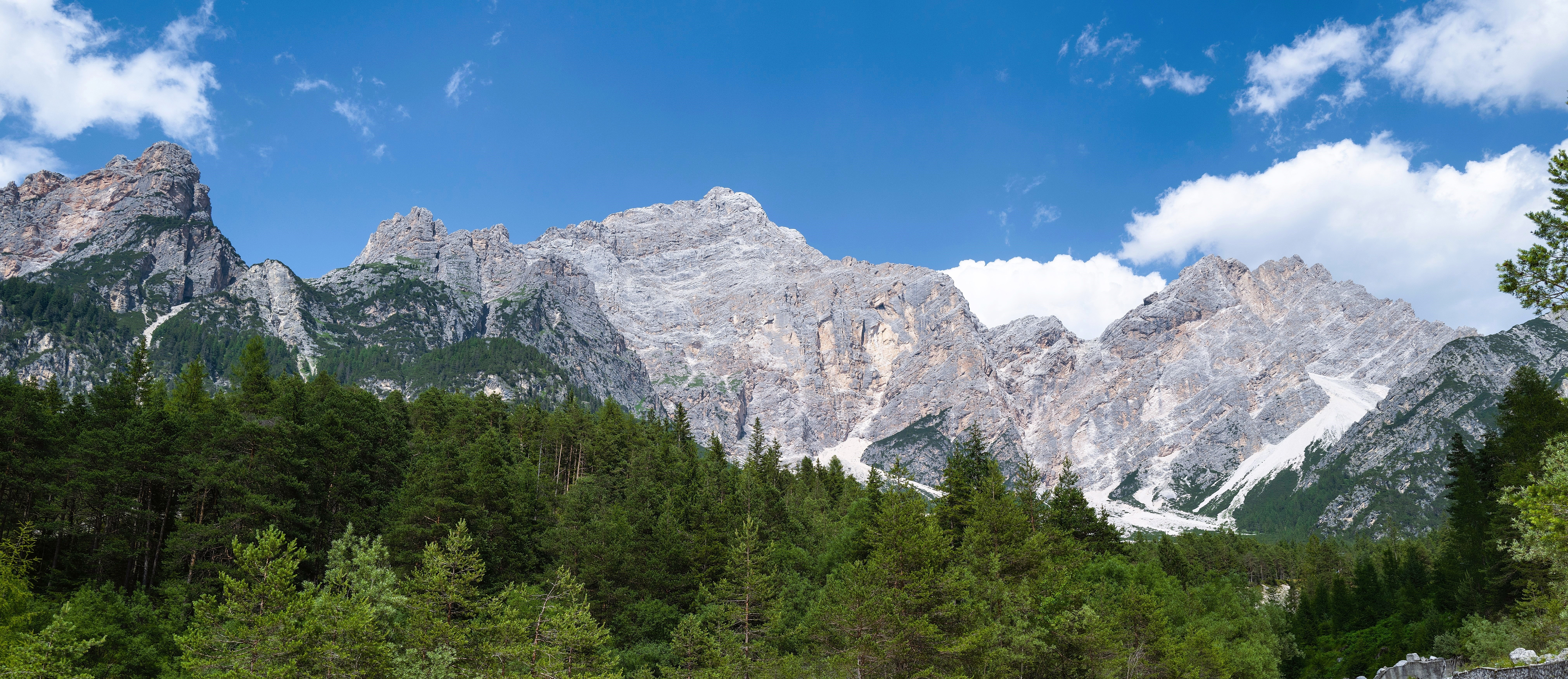
Southwest aspect of Cima Belprà centered

== See also ==
- Southern Limestone Alps
