= Cimon del Froppa =

Mountain in Italy

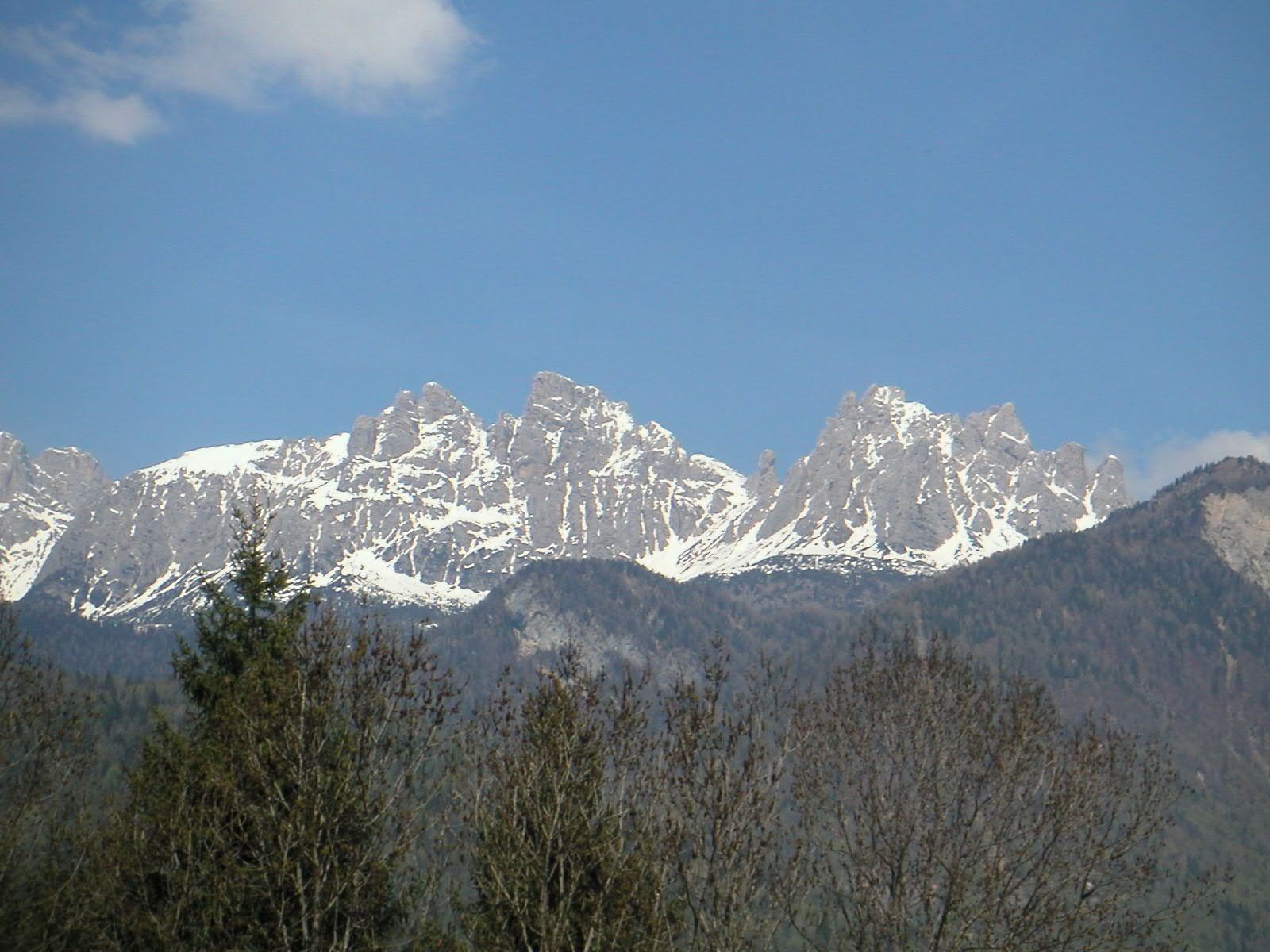
- Cimon del Froppa (centre)

Highest point
- Elevation: 2,932 m (9,619 ft)
- Prominence: 677 m (2,221 ft)
- Coordinates: 46°30′N 12°20′E

Geography
- Location within Italy Location within Alps
- Interactive map of Cimon del Froppa
- Country: Italy
- Province: Belluno
- Protected area: Dolomites World Heritage Site
- Parent range: Dolomites; Marmarole
- Topo map: Tabacco 016 Dolomiti del Centro Cadore

Geology
- Rock age: Triassic
- Rock type: Dolomite

Cimon del Froppa (2,932m) is the highest peak of the Marmarole range in the Dolomites in Veneto, north-eastern Italy. The mountain is rarely climbed, as it is somewhat overshadowed by its higher neighbours Antelao and Sorapiss. The usual route is from the south.

== Climate ==
Based on the Köppen climate classification, Cimon del Froppa is located in an alpine climate zone with long, cold winters, and short, mild summers. Weather systems are forced upwards by the mountains (orographic lift), causing moisture to drop in the form of rain and snow. The months of June through September offer the most favorable weather for visiting or climbing in this area.

== Gallery ==
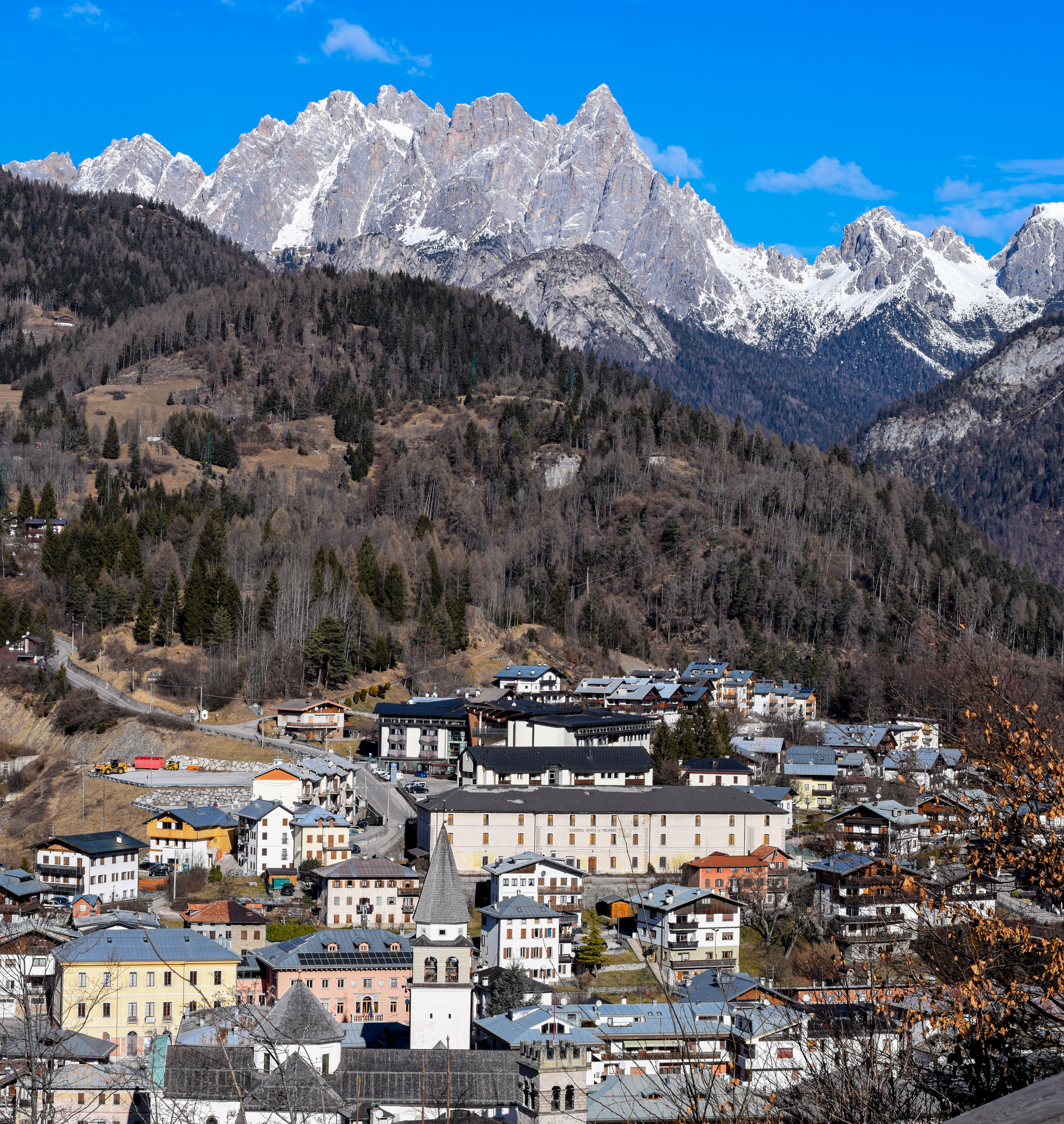
Cimon del Froppa and Croda Bianca viewed from Pieve di Cadore

== See also ==
- Southern Limestone Alps
