= Valfornace =

- Comune
- Comune di Valfornace
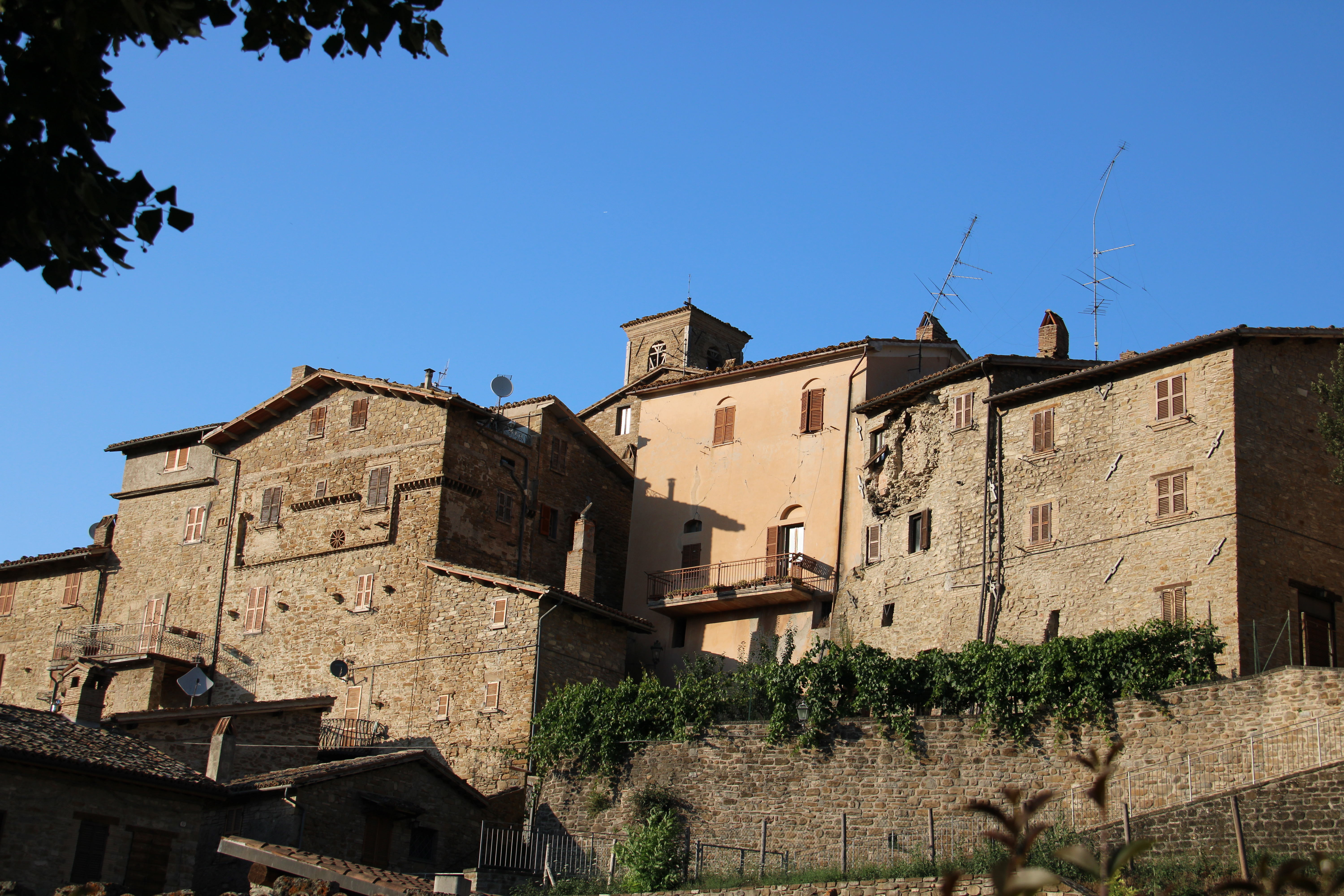

- Location within Italy Location within Marche
- Coordinates: 43°3′43″N 13°5′3″E
- Country: Italy
- Region: Marche
- Province: Macerata (MC)

Government
  - Mayor: Massimo Citracca

Area
  - Total: 48.61 km^{2} (18.77 sq mi)

Population (31 August 2017)
  - Total: 1,026
  - Density: 21.11/km^{2} (54.67/sq mi)
- Time zone: UTC+1 (CET)
  - Summer (DST): UTC+2 (CEST)
- Postal code: 62031
- Dialing code: 0737
- Website: Official website

Valfornace is a comune (municipality) in the Province of Macerata in the Italian region Marche.

It was established on 1 January 2017 by the merger of Fiordimonte and Pievebovigliana.
