= Fiordimonte =

- Frazione
- Location of Fiordimonte in Italy
- Coordinates: 43°2′N 13°5′E
- Country: Italy
- Region: Marche
- Province: Macerata (MC)
- Comune: Valfornace

Area
  - Total: 21.2 km^{2} (8.2 sq mi)
- Elevation: 569 m (1,867 ft)

Population (28 February 2009)
  - Total: 227
  - Density: 10.7/km^{2} (27.7/sq mi)
- Demonym: Fiordimontesi
- Time zone: UTC+1 (CET)
  - Summer (DST): UTC+2 (CEST)
- Postal code: 62030
- Dialing code: 0737

Fiordimonte is a frazione of the comune of Valfornace in the Province of Macerata in the Italian region Marche, located about 70 kilometres (43 mi) southwest of Ancona and about 40 kilometres (25 mi) southwest of Macerata. It was a separate comune until 1 January 2017, when it was merged with Pievebovigliana, which created the Valfornace comune.
