= Croda Bianca =

Mountain in Italy

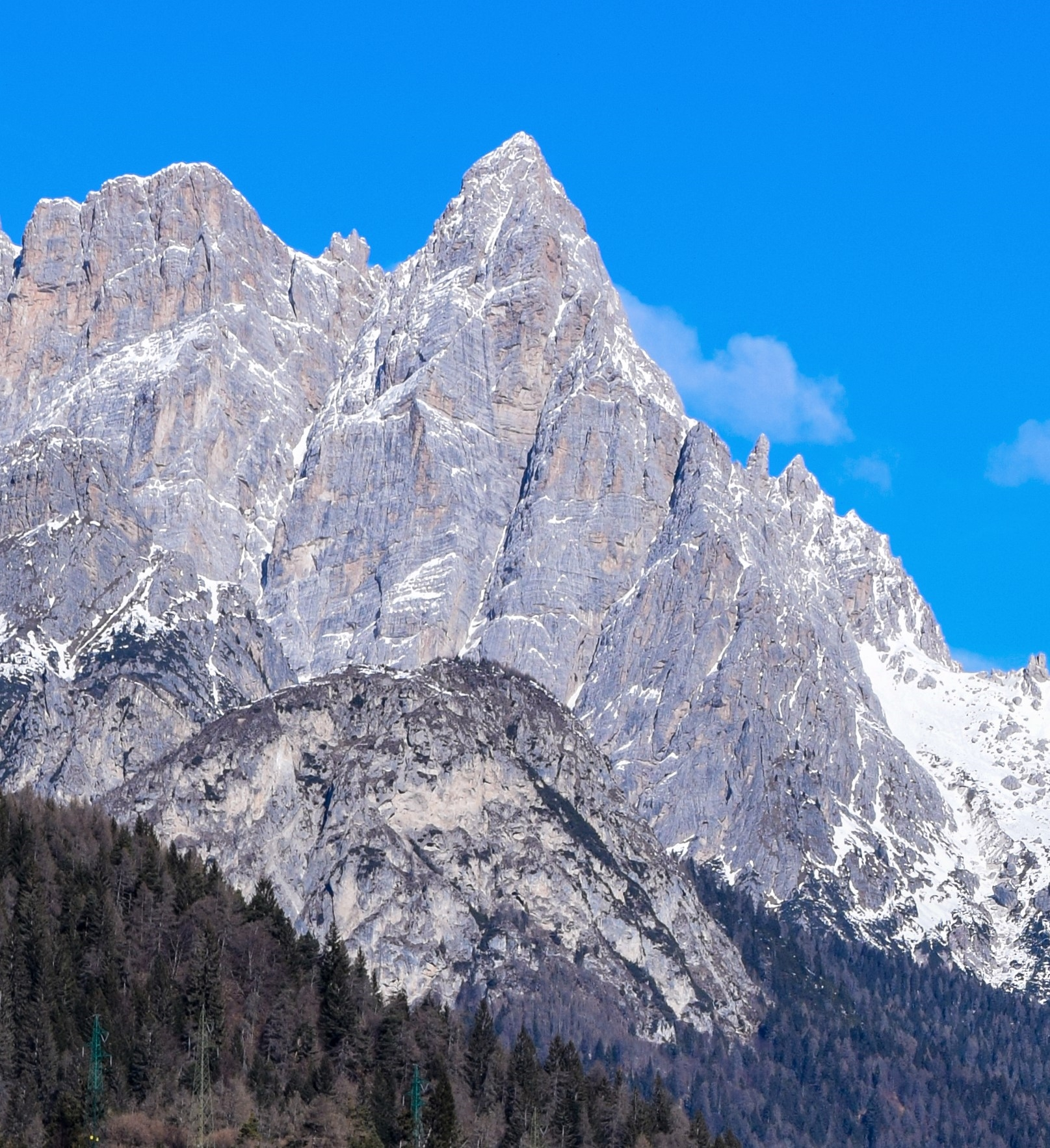
- South aspect

Highest point
- Elevation: 2,841 m (9,321 ft)
- Prominence: 180 m (591 ft)
- Parent peak: Cimon del Froppa
- Isolation: 0.83 km (0.52 mi)
- Coordinates: 46°30′18″N 12°21′05″E

Naming
- Etymology: White Crag

Geography
- Location within Italy Location within Alps
- Interactive map of Croda Bianca
- Country: Italy
- Province: Belluno
- Protected area: Dolomites World Heritage Site
- Parent range: Dolomites; Marmarole
- Topo map: Tabacco 016 Dolomiti del Centro Cadore

Geology
- Rock age: Triassic
- Rock type: Dolomite

Climbing
- First ascent: 1890

Croda Bianca is a mountain in the province of Belluno in northern Italy.

== Description ==
Croda Bianca is a 2,841-meter-elevation (9,321-foot) summit in the Marmarole group of the Dolomites, and as part of the Dolomites is a UNESCO World Heritage site. Set in the Veneto region, the peak is located eight kilometers (5 miles) north of Pieve di Cadore. Precipitation runoff from the peak's slopes drains into tributaries of the Piave. Topographic relief is significant as the summit rises 1100 meters (3,609 feet) along the north slope in one kilometer (0.6 mile), and 940 meters (3,084 feet) along the southeast slope in one kilometer. The nearest higher neighbor is Cimon del Froppa, 0.86 kilometer (0.53 mile) to the west-northwest. The first ascent of Croda Bianca was accomplished on June 29, 1890, by Luigi Bernard, Ludwig Darmstädter, Veit Innerkofler, Hans Stabeler, Alba Helversen, and Hans Helversen via the east side. The Spigolo Fantòn climbing route on the southeast ridge was first climbed on June 30, 1910, by brothers Umberto and Arturo Fanton. The mountain's toponym translates such that Croda (Ladin) means "crag or peak" and Bianca (Italian) means "white."

== Climate ==
Based on the Köppen climate classification, Croda Bianca is located in an alpine climate zone with long, cold winters, and short, mild summers. Weather systems are forced upwards by the mountains (orographic lift), causing moisture to drop in the form of rain and snow. The months of June through September offer the most favorable weather for visiting or climbing in this area.

== Gallery ==
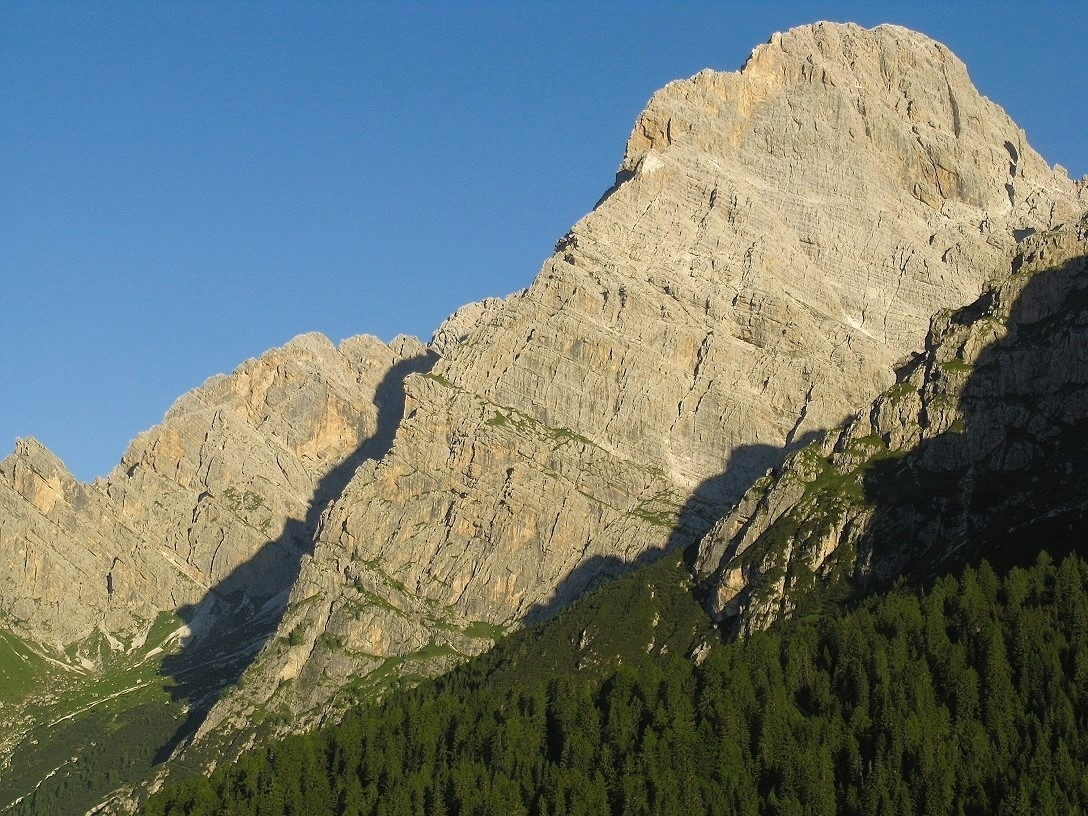
East aspect of Croda Bianca featuring Spigolo Fantòn

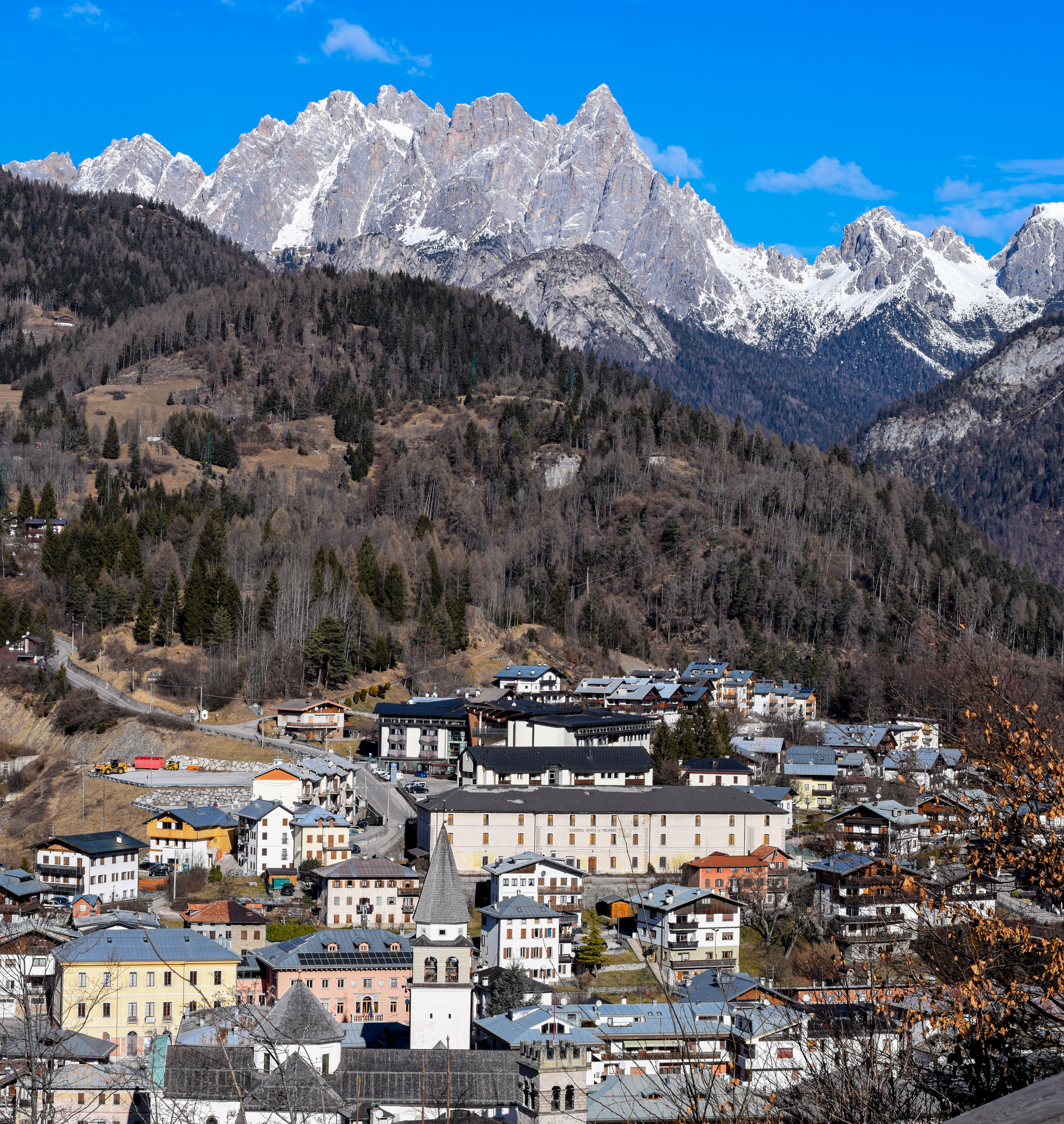
Croda Bianca viewed from the south at Pieve di Cadore

== See also ==
- Southern Limestone Alps
