= Marmarole =

Mountain in Italy

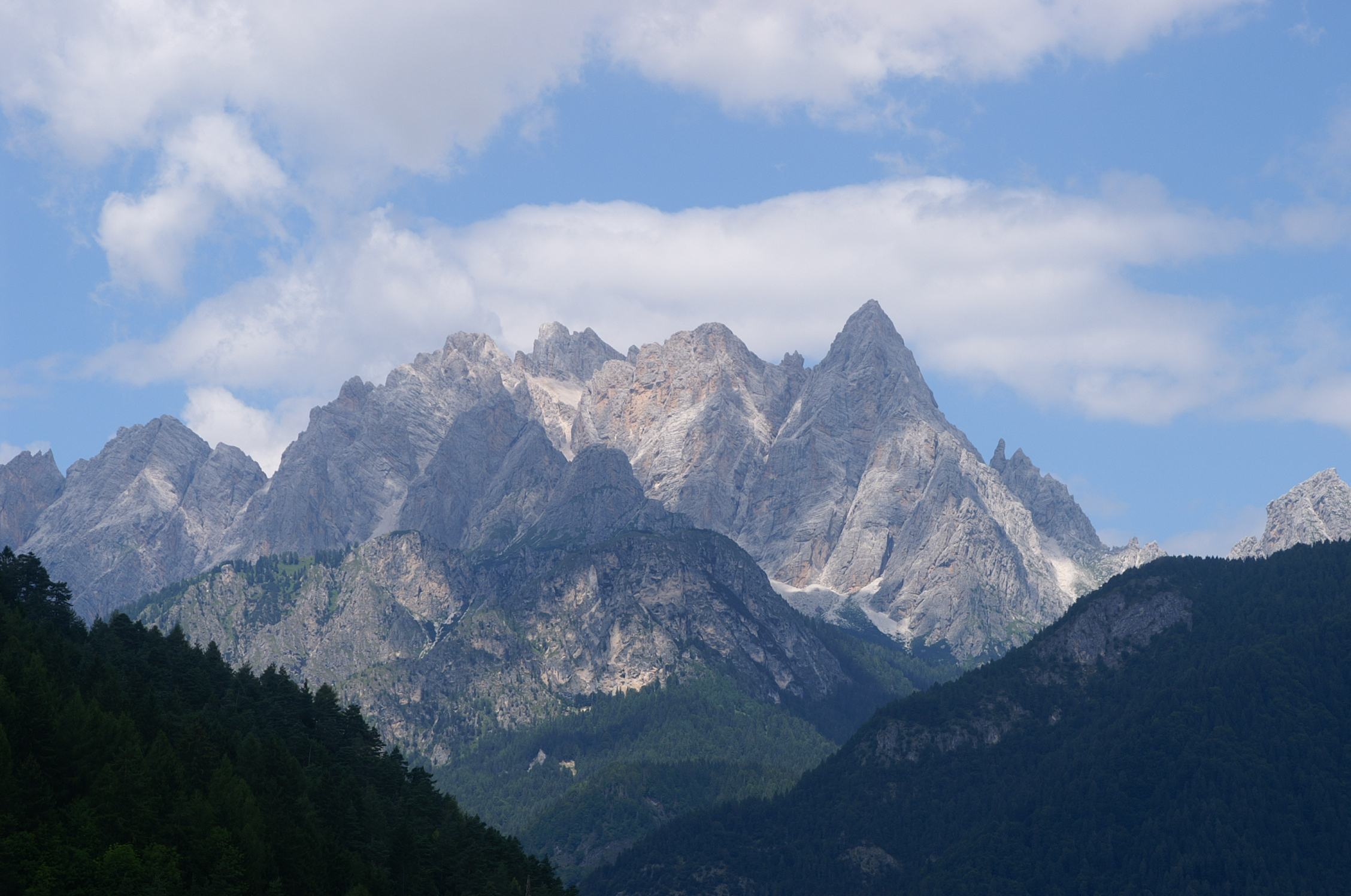
- The Marmarole

Highest point
- Peak: Cimon del Froppa
- Elevation: 2,932 m (9,619 ft)
- Coordinates: 46°30′N 12°21′E

Geography
- Location within Alps
- Country: Italy
- Province: Belluno
- Parent range: Alps

Marmarole is a mountain group of the Dolomites in Belluno, northern Italy. Located west of the Cadore Valley and north-east of the major peak of Antelao, it is known as a wild range, possibly the wildest of the entire Dolomites, due to the relative difficulty of climbing its peaks and its isolation from nearby valleys. Conversely, it is a popular destination for experienced hikers and alpinists.

The highest peak of the Marmarole is the Cimon del Froppa which reaches 2,932 m.

== Classification ==
According to SOIUSA, the Marmarole are an alpine group with the following classification:

Big part = Eastern Alps Large sector = South-Eastern Alps Section = Dolomites Subsection = Sesto, Braies and Ampezzo Dolomites Supergroup = Cadore Dolomites Group = Marmarole Group Code = II / C-31.I-E.21

The group is then divided into three subgroups:

Bel Pra subgroup (also called Western Marmarole) Subgroup of Central Marmarole Subgroup of Ciastelin (also called Oriental Marmarole)

== See also ==
- Cima Belprà
- Cima Bastioni
- Campanile Ciastelin
- Croda Bianca
