= Pievebovigliana =

- Frazione
- Location of Pievebovigliana in Italy
- Coordinates: 43°03′43″N 13°05′02″E
- Country: Italy
- Region: Marche
- Province: Macerata (MC)
- Comune: Valfornace

Area
  - Total: 27.3 km^{2} (10.5 sq mi)
- Elevation: 439 m (1,440 ft)

Population (28 February 2009)
  - Total: 895
  - Density: 32.8/km^{2} (84.9/sq mi)
- Demonym: Pieveboviglianesi
- Time zone: UTC+1 (CET)
  - Summer (DST): UTC+2 (CEST)
- Postal code: 62035
- Dialing code: 0737

Pievebovigliana is a frazione of Valfornace in the Province of Macerata in the Italian region Marche, located about 70 kilometres (43 mi) southwest of Ancona and about 40 kilometres (25 mi) southwest of Macerata. It was a separate comune until January 1, 2017, when it was merged with Fiordimonte, which created the Valfornace comune. It is located in the Monti Sibillini National Park.

== People ==
- Opera singer Enzo Sordello was born in Pievebovigliana in 1927.
- English actress Claire Forlani married Scottish actor Dougray Scott in Italy in a civil ceremony on June 8, 2007, with the wedding reception in the Forlani family home in Pievebovigliana. Her Italian father, Pierluigi, told a local newspaper he would be the official cook.
