= Sorapiss =

Mountain ridge in the Dolomites

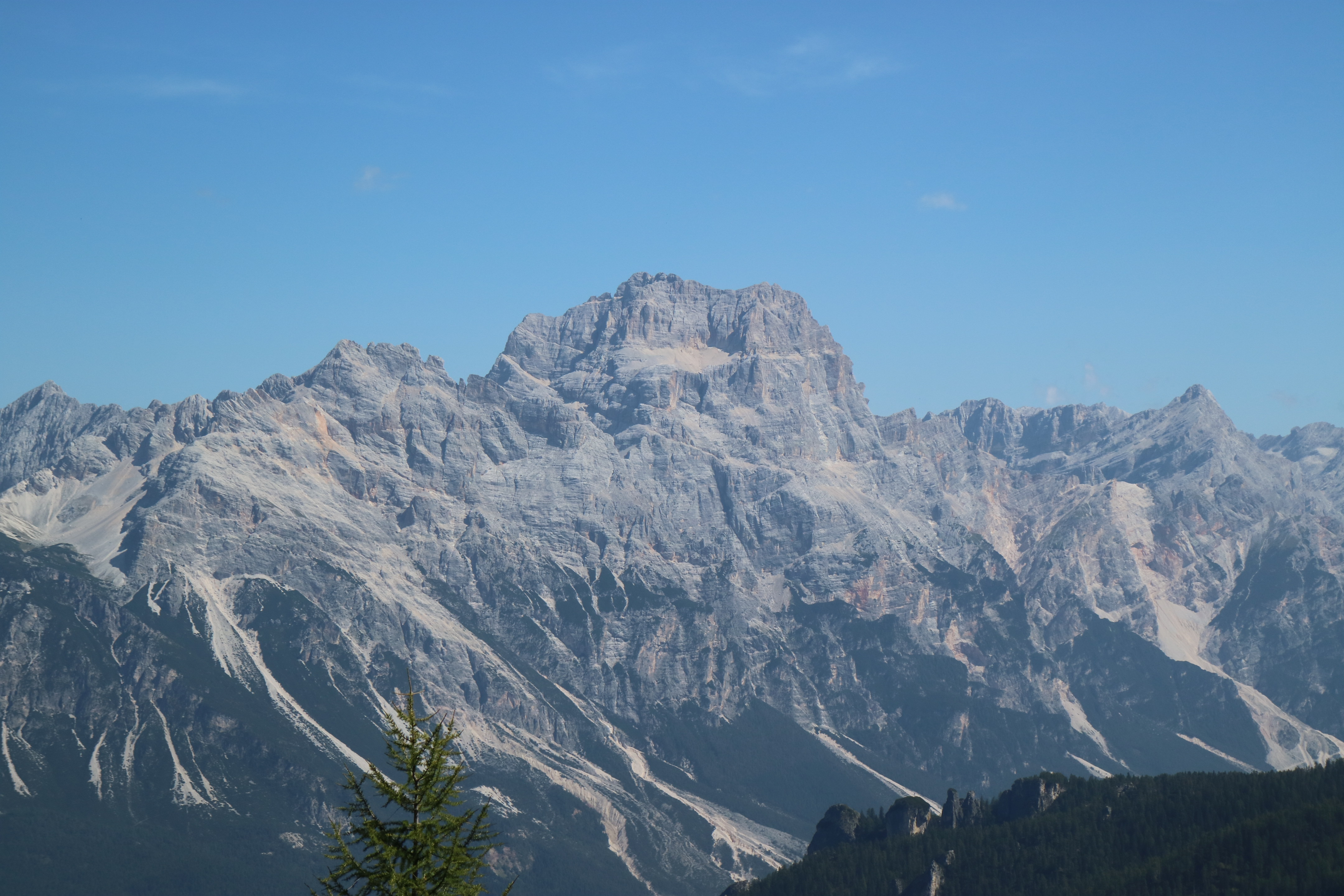
- Sorapiss

Highest point
- Elevation: 3,205 m (10,515 ft)
- Prominence: 1,085 m (3,560 ft)
- Listing: Alpine mountains above 3000 m
- Coordinates: 46°30′N 12°13′E

Geography
- Location within Alps
- Location: Veneto, Italy
- Parent range: Dolomites

Sorapiss, also referred to as Sorapis or Punta Sorapiss, is a mountain in the Dolomites within the Veneto region of northern Italy. Situated in the comune of Cortina d'Ampezzo, it has an elevation of 3,205 metres (10,515 ft). In its vicinity is a mountain pass of the same name, as well as Sorapiss Lake (Lago di Sorapiss), at the foot of the mountain.

== Description ==
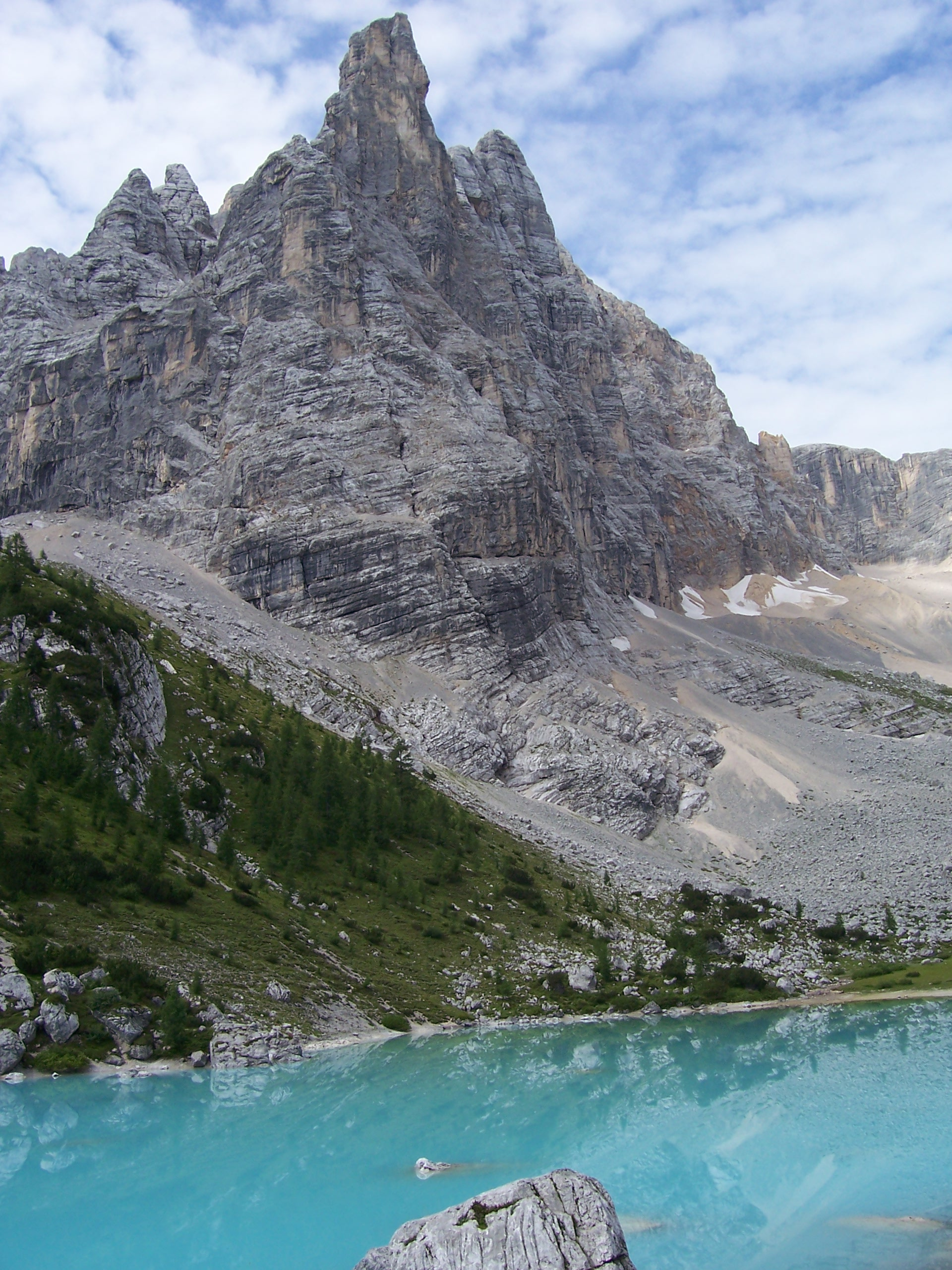
Dito di Dio (Finger of God), with Lago di Sorapiss at its foot

Sorapiss, with its huge perpendicular faces, forms part of the mountainous backdrop to the resort town of Cortina, situated roughly 9 kilometres (5.6 mi) to the southeast of the town. The limestone dolomite formations, which are irregular, rugged and sharp-edged peaks, are part of the Eastern Alps. The Cristallo group lies to the north past the Passo Tre Croci, and its southern neighbour is the Antelao. A path to Sorapiss starts at Passo Tre Croci and continues along an easy slope, reaching the refuge at the base of the Sorapiss range, close to Lago di Sorapiss, which is at an elevation of 1,923 metres (6,309 ft).

The elevation of Sorapiss is 3,205 metres (10,515 ft). The mountain has three ridges: a central ridge, a southern ridge, which is the part of the mountain that can be seen from Cortina, and, beyond a high pass and little to the west, a northern ridge that culminates in the skiing area of Mount Faloria. There are three glaciers on the mountain's slopes, although these have been melting considerably in recent years. Lago Sorapiss, at the foot of the mountain, is a glacial lake at an elevation 1,925 metres (6,316 ft).

== History ==
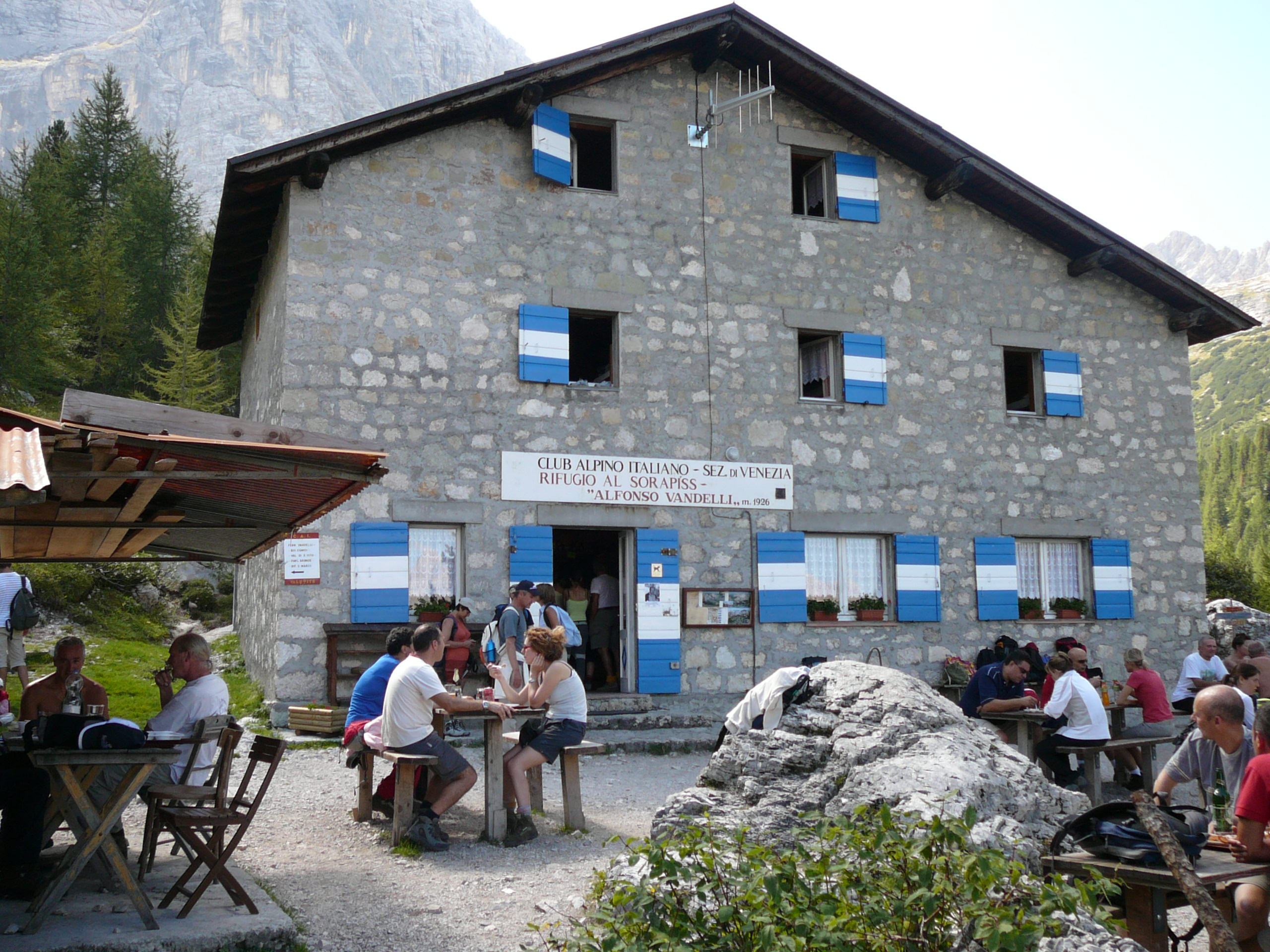
Rifugio Alfonso Vandelli

There are three refuges in the vicinity: Rifugio Tondi di Faloria at 2,327 metres (7,635 ft), Rifugio Alfonso Vandelli at 1,926 metres (6,319 ft) and Rifugio San Marco. Rifugio Alfonso Vandelli was built by Austrians in 1891 on the banks of Lago di Sorapiss. In 1895 it was destroyed by an avalanche, but was rebuilt the following year in a more sheltered spot. At the end of World War I in 1918, Cortina d'Ampezzo became part of the Kingdom of Italy (1918) and the refuge became the property of the CAI (Club Alpino Italiano) of Venice. In 1924, thanks to a donation by Cesare Luigi Luzzati, a new refuge was built. A fire destroyed it completely in 1959, and it was again reconstructed; the current shelter was opened on 18 September 1966 and was named after the president of the CAI of Venice, Alfonso Vandelli.

Paul Grohmann made the first ascent of the mountain in September 1864, taking 8 hours and 30 minutes. There are at least two routes to the summit: the Grohmann-Weg, which crosses the mountain's west flank, joining the S. Vito route near the summit, and the Muller-Weg, which traverses the east glacier and ascends direct over the precipices on the northeast side.

== Flora ==
The flora on Sorapiss includes Festucetum pulchellae (slopes), Euphrasio-Globularietum (base), and Drabetum hoppeanae (on the range).

== Legend ==
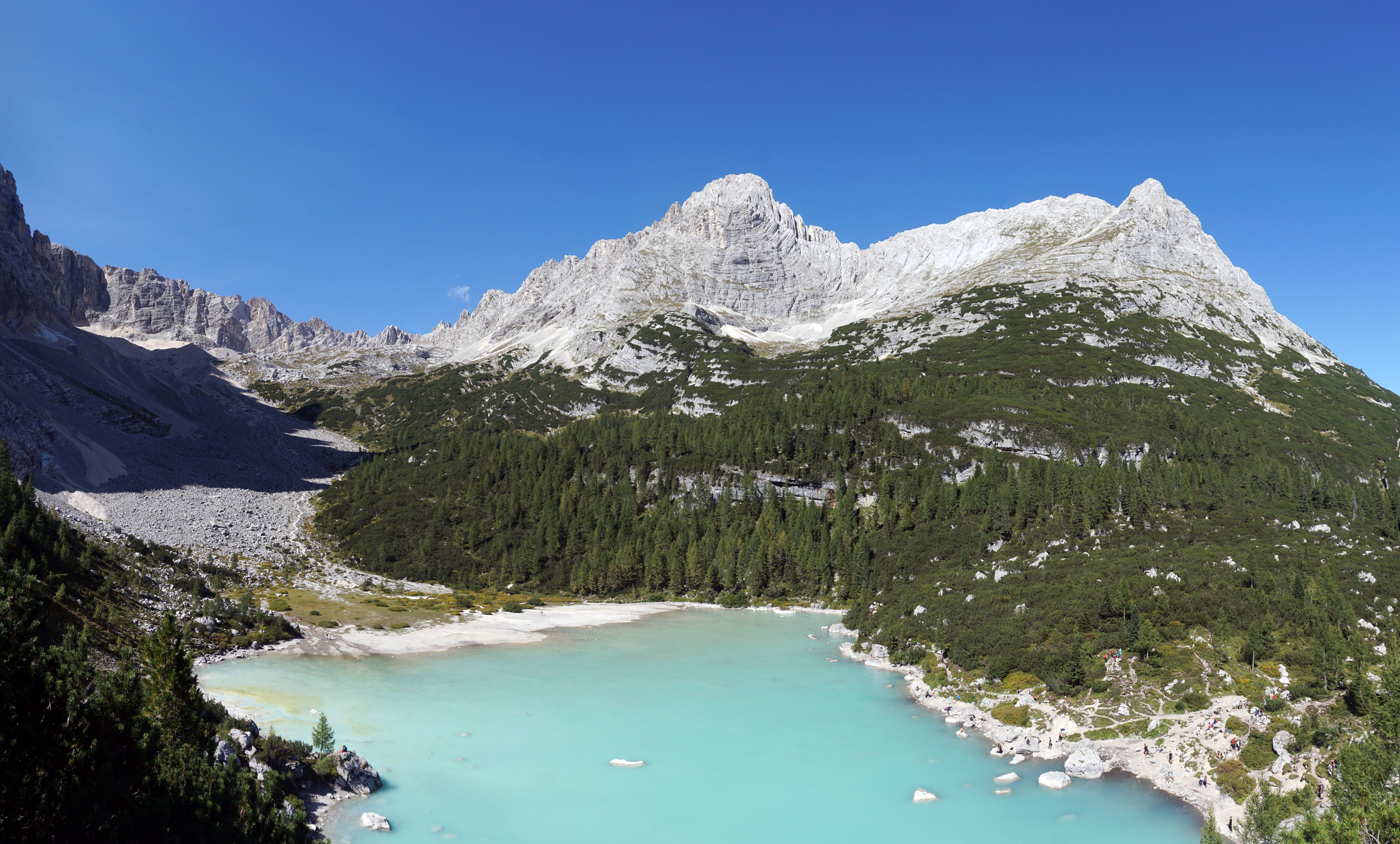
Lago Sorapiss

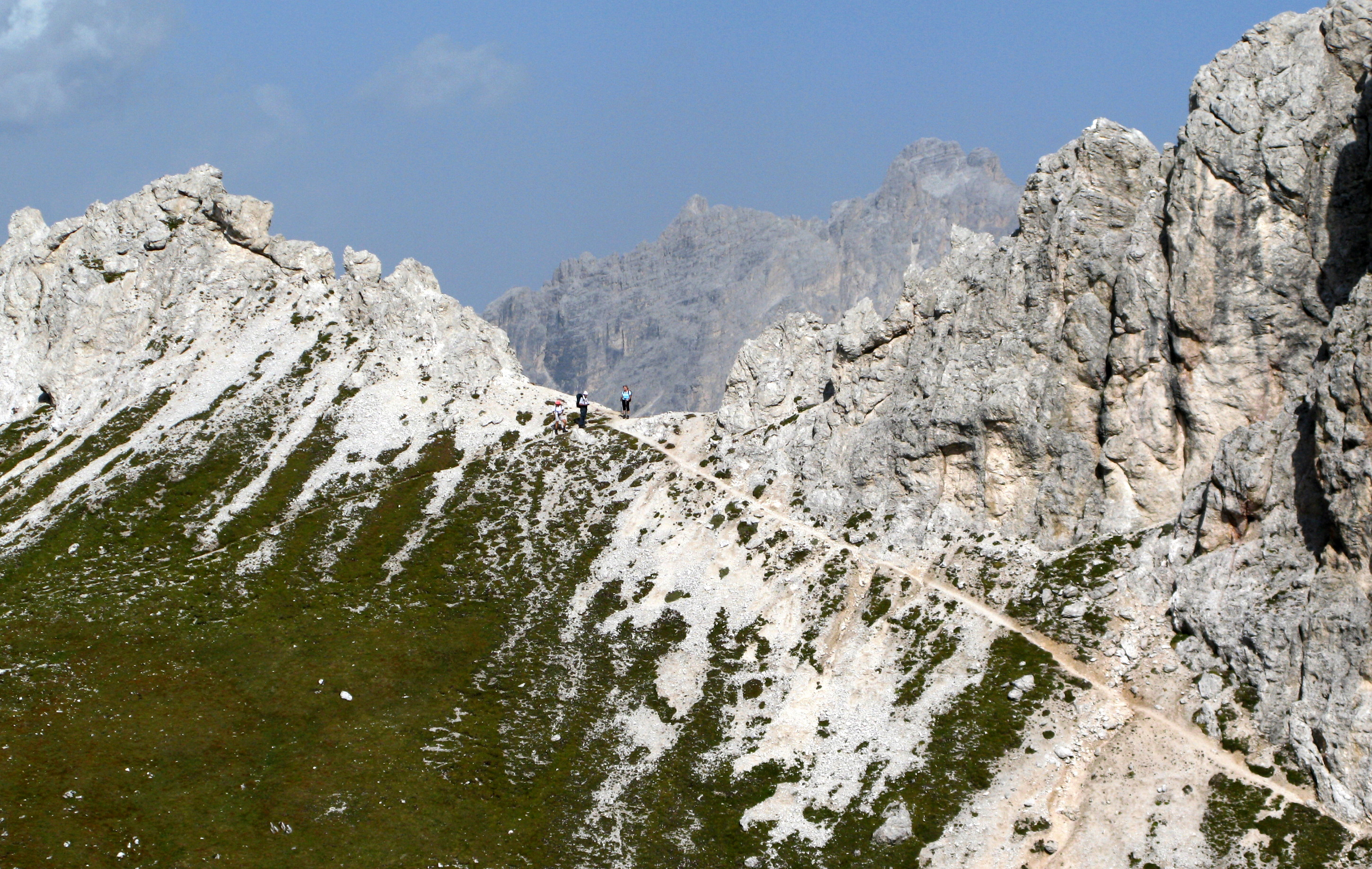
Forcella Ciadin del Loudo-Path N°223

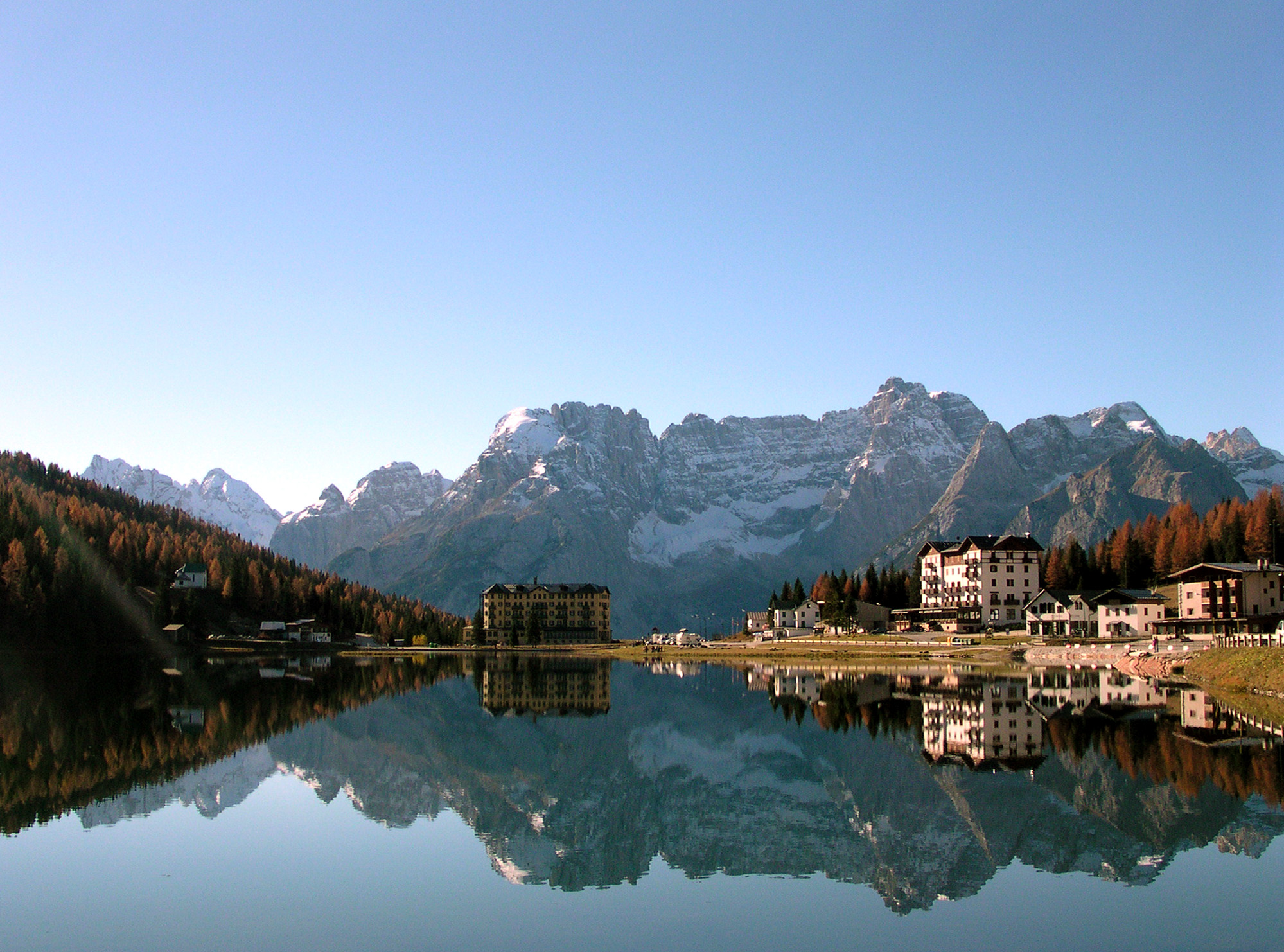
Sorapiss from Lake Misurina

There is a legend associated with the name of Sorapiss, which in local dialect means "above the waterfall". A "peace-loving" king named Sorapiss turned himself into a rocky mountain during a course of unexpected events. A witch had bewitched the king's impulsive daughter Misurina by promising her a magical mirror as a reward for providing shade to her house. This was honoured by her doting father, who turned himself into a mountain. At a later date, Misurina, demonstrating a sense of gratitude towards her father, cried and shed tears which formed the Lago di Sorapiss at the foot of the large cliff of Sorapiss, the immobilized form of her father.

== Sources ==
- Baedeker, Karl (1899). Eastern Alps (Public domain ed.). Dulau and Company.
- Baedeker, Karl (1883). The Eastern Alps, Including the Bavarian Highlands, the Tyrol, Salzkammergut, Styria, Carinthia, Carniola, and Istria: Handbook for Travellers (Public domain ed.). K. Baedeker. p. 282.
- Carnovalini, Riccardo; Carnovalini, Cristina (1987). Grandi trekking italiani: 200 giorni di cammino su Alpi e Appennini (in Italian). Edizioni Mediterranee.
- Fabris, Marissa (1 January 2005). Venice and the Veneto. Hunter Publishing, Inc. p. 62. ISBN 978-1-58843-519-4.
- Pignatti, Erika; Pignatti, Sandro; Isenberg, Philip (5 December 2013). Plant Life of the Dolomites: Vegetation Structure and Ecology. Springer Science & Business Media. ISBN 978-3-642-31043-0.
- Price, Gillian (20 March 2015). Shorter Walks in the Dolomites. Cicerone Press. ISBN 978-1-78362-179-8.
- Raza, Moonis (1 January 1990). Geographical Dictionary Of The World In The Early 20th Century With Pronouncing Gazetteer (in 2 Vos.). Concept Publishing Company. ISBN 978-81-7268-011-4.
- Reynolds, Kev (21 July 2011). Walking in the Alps: A comprehensive guide to walking and trekking throughout the Alps. Cicerone Press Limited. ISBN 978-1-84965-438-8.
- Robertson, Alexander (1903). Through the Dolomities. George Allen.
