= Northeast Region =

Northeast Region may be:

- Northeast Region (Boy Scouts of America)
- List of Missouri conservation areas – Northeast region
- Northeast Region, Brazil
- Northeastern United States
- North-East Region, Singapore
- Northeastern Statistical Region in North Macedonia
- Northeast India
- Northeast (Vietnam)
- Northeastern United States (disambiguation)
