= NROC =

NROC may refer to:

- National Reconnaissance Operations Center
- Nelson Rocks Outdoor Center
- Northeast Regional Ocean Council
