= The Gobbins =

Cliff-path tourist attraction in Northern Ireland

- Interactive map of The Gobbins
- 54°48′04″N 5°41′24″W
- Location: Islandmagee; County Antrim, Northern Ireland

History
- Built: 1902–1908
- Built for: Belfast and Northern Counties Railway Company
- Rebuilt: 2011–2015

Site notes
- Architect: Berkeley Deane Wise
- Restored by: Larne Borough Council
- Website: http://thegobbinscliffpath.com

The Gobbins is a cliff-face running from Whitehead to Portmuck Harbour along the eastern coast of Islandmagee, County Antrim, Northern Ireland, on the Causeway Coastal Route. The Gobbins cliff path runs across bridges, past caves and through a tunnel, along The Gobbins cliffs (Irish: Gobán meaning 'tip/point of land' or 'headland'). The cliffs are recognised for their rich birdlife, important geology and notable species. James Kerr lost his life by falling over the Gobbins cliffs on 11 Jun 1892 aged 14 years when collecting seagull eggs, and he is interred in the nearby Ballypriormore Cemetery.

The Gobbins cliff path was created by an Irish railway engineer called Berkeley Deane Wise. He designed and built the path as a tourist attraction for the Belfast and Northern Counties Railway Company. The path first opened to the public in 1902, with visitors paying 6d to enjoy a 'perfect marvel of engineering'. The Gobbins drew worldwide acclaim, with newspapers declaring that 'the varied beauty of this cliff path baffles all description'.

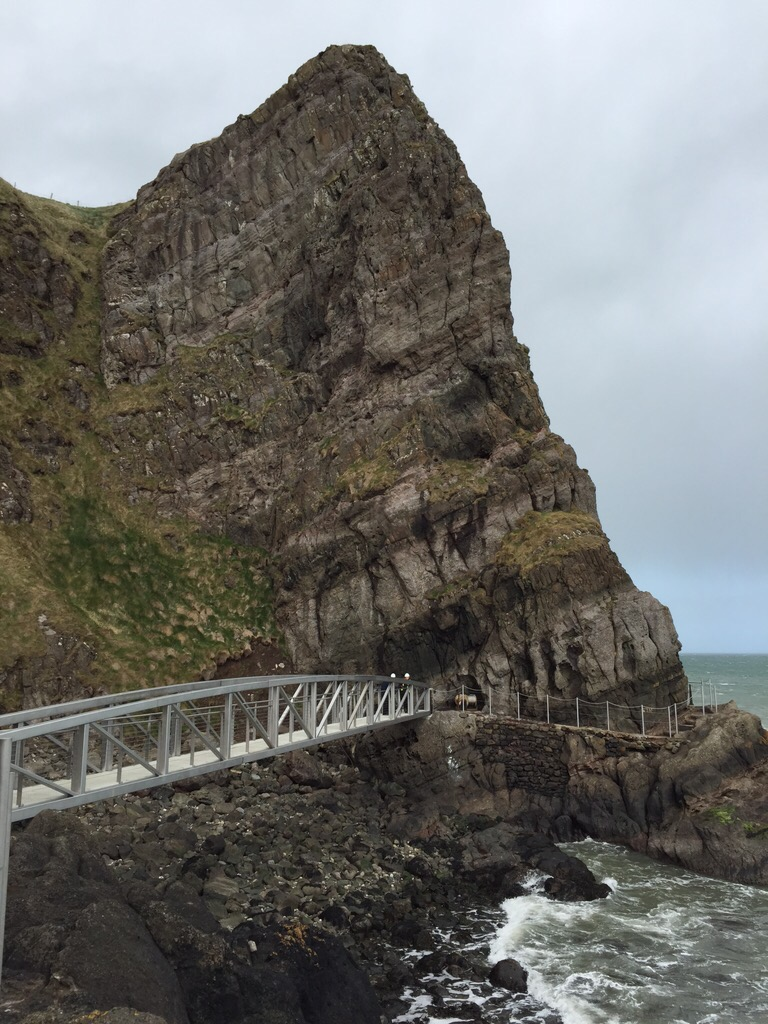
Bridge and cliff at The Gobbins

Thousands of people visited The Gobbins in the first few decades of the 20th century – advertisements of the time declared 'the new cliff path along The Gobbins Cliffs, with its ravines, bore caves, natural aquariums ... has no parallel in Europe as a marine cliff walk'. However, the railway company got into financial difficulties during the 1930s; upkeep slipped and the path was closed in the run-up to the Second World War. The Gobbins cliff path was briefly reopened by the Ulster Transport Authority after the war but closed in 1954. Several abortive attempts were made by government and individuals to restore the path.

From 2011-2015 Larne Borough Council led a project to reopen The Gobbins cliff path. A series of new bridges and galleries were constructed and installed during 2014–15. The work was funded by the European Union's Interreg IVA Programme, managed by the Special EU Programmes Body (SEUPB) and administered by the North East Partnership, Larne Borough Council and Ulster Garden Villages Limited.

The Gobbins was accessible to visitors from August 2015 by guided tour. Opening for the 2016 summer season was delayed until the end of April following storm damage to the approach path in January 2016 but further damage occurred in June 2016. The path re-opened on 30 June 2017. Car parking, a café, exhibition and visitor facilities for The Gobbins are provided by the visitor centre at nearby Ballystrudder. As of 2025 the path had been closed for 46% of the time since 2015, for a variety of reasons including planned works, rockfalls, storm damage, and inspections.

== History ==
=== Conception ===
The Gobbins cliff path was the brainchild of a pioneering Irish railway engineer called Berkeley Deane Wise. Originally from New Ross, Wise served his apprenticeship working on the railway line between Dublin and Wexford. At the age of just 22, he developed tunnels and bridges for one of the most challenging sections in the country, along the coast at Bray Head. This and other experiences helped give Wise the skills he needed to conceive his ultimate achievement – The Gobbins cliff path – just over 25 years later.

In 1888, Wise became the Chief Engineer of the Belfast and Northern Counties Railway Company. The company already had a keen interest in tourism, thanks to the work of another pioneer, Railway Manager, Edward John Cotton – one of the youngest ever Railway Managers in Britain and Ireland. Cotton arranged 'excursion trains' for every occasion and made 3rd class tickets available from all stations – opening up the possibility of travel and day trips for thousands of ordinary people.

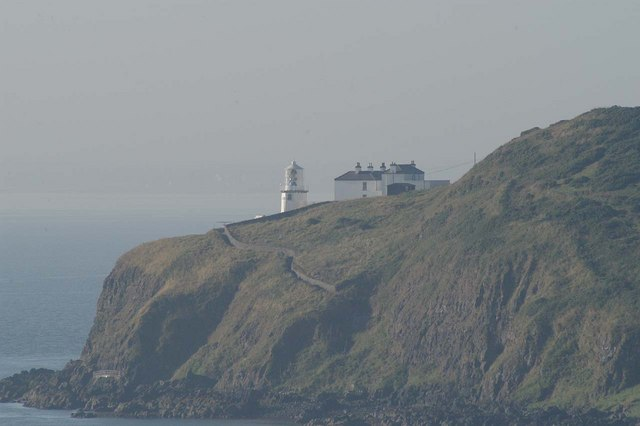
Blackhead Lighthouse – Berkeley Deane Wise built bridges and a tunnel to make a path here before he created The Gobbins.

Berkeley Deane Wise took this tourism endeavour to the next level, creating innovative new paid-for attractions that would encourage visitors to use the railway company's services. Within a year of starting at the 'Northern Counties', he had opened a series of paths and bridges at beautiful Glenariff Glen – later adding a tearoom and shelters with coloured glass to view the waterfalls there. Just south of The Gobbins, Wise helped transform the tiny hamlet of Whitehead into a premier holiday resort. He designed and built a bandstand, ladies and gents bathing boxes, a 'children's corner', a slipway and a pavilion with 500 seats.

Wise also built a new path along the coast from Whitehead to the lighthouse at Blackhead, overlooking the town, in 1892. To reach the lighthouse he added several bridges and a tunnel. Wise soon had ambitious plans for a much more elaborate path built on sheer cliffs a few miles to the north: The Gobbins cliff path was about to be born.

=== Original construction ===
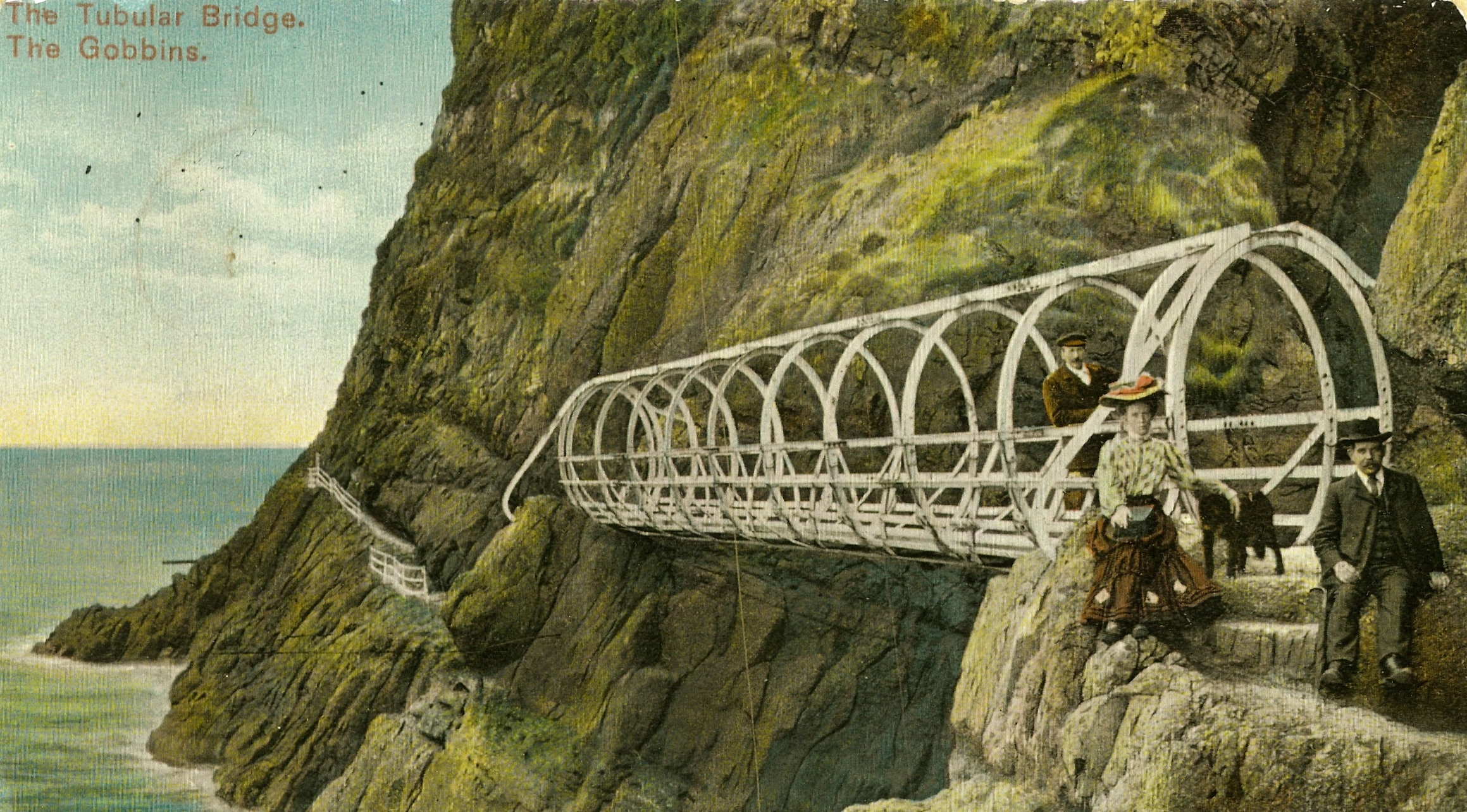
Postcard of The Tubular Bridge - believed to show the creator of The Gobbins, Berkley Deane Wise and his wife, Leah, in about 1902.

Berkeley Deane Wise drew up a map of his planned path in 1902, showing a 3 1/4-mile-long (5.2 km) route. It would start near the village of Ballystrudder (a small laneway just off the 'Gobbins Road' is still called the 'Gobbins Path' as a consequence). The path would then run for a mile or more along an undulating section of coast, skirting farmers' fields before reaching the spectacular 'cliff section' where visitors would enjoy bridges, tunnels and caves. It is this last section which became so famous and which is accessible today (by guided tour, leaving from The Gobbins visitor centre). Wise's map listed a series of new names for features along the cliffs, which he planned for visitors to explore – like Sandy Cave, the Man O'War stack and Otter Cave.

The first stretch of The Gobbins cliff path opened to the public in August 1902. First to explore its 'strange, fantastic forms' were members of the British Association for the Advancement of Science. In June 1904, Wise hosted the Institution of Civil Engineers of Ireland (of which he was an esteemed member). Their Journal records some of the few surviving technical details of the bridges and other constructions on the original path:

"...the cliff section has necessitated a large number of bridges, varying from ten to thirty feet span… About mid way an isolated sea-stack occurs known as 'The Man-o'War', separated from the mainland by a chasm 65 feet wide…To span this a special bridge was designed by Mr Wise. The steel framework is 70 feet in length and is composed of longitudinal angles and bars with 12 elliptical stiffeners"

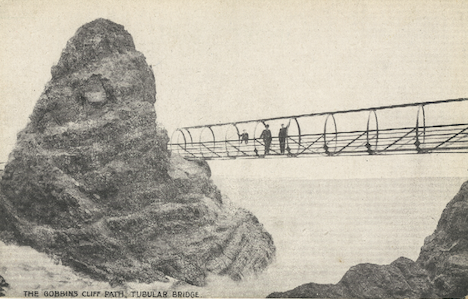
The original Tubular Bridge at The Gobbins

The 'special bridge' the engineers were describing was the famous Tubular Bridge – which quickly became a symbol of The Gobbins.

=== Extension ===
When it first opened, the path stopped short of the 'Seven Sisters' caves. But Wise's map shows he planned to continue building to Heddles' port and create an exit onto the 'county' road. in 1905 he was granted money to extend The Gobbins cliff path by the railway company – which had become part of the larger Midland Railway Company (MR).

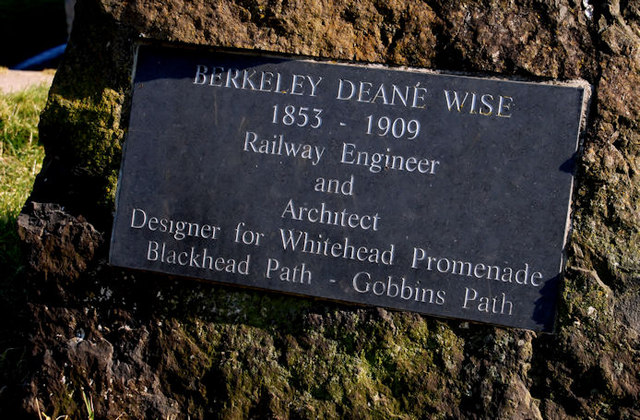
Plaque to B.D. Wise at Whitehead

In June 1906 Wise fell ill, and his job was taken over by the company's Locomotive Engineer Bowman Malcolm. Further work was undertaken including blasting a tunnel at the rear of 'Trump Cave', and building the supports for a suspended walkway inside another cave. Additional steps were cut, bridges built and ironwork for handrails installed at different points along the cliffs.

An extension was duly opened in 1908, but disaster struck in the last week of May that year: a major landslip broke one of the bridges and blocked the path. The company gave orders that the path was to be maintained 'as far as it went', but that no further work was to be undertaken. There would be no new bridges built at The Gobbins for over 100 years. Berkeley Deane Wise died in May 1909. He would have been disappointed to know that his plans were never fully completed, but nonetheless, The Gobbins cliff path was recognised as his crowning achievement.

=== The first era of The Gobbins ===
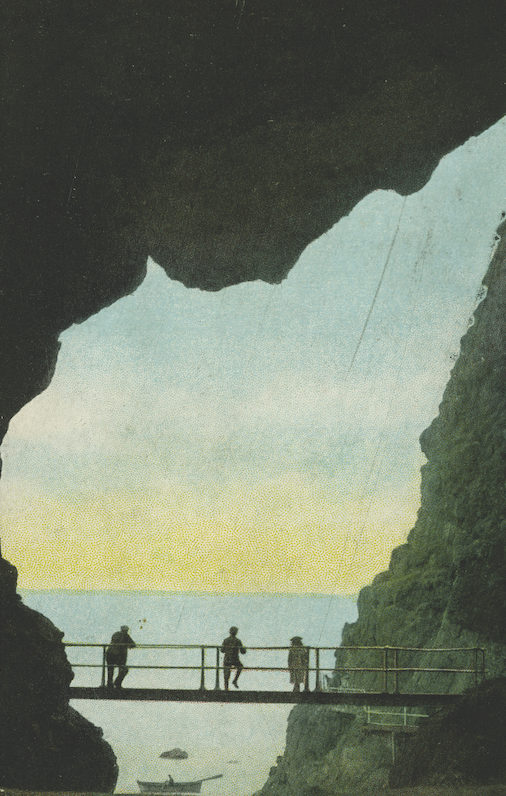
View of a bridge from inside a cave at The Gobbins

The Gobbins became a must-see for tourists and locals alike – including many visitors from Britain who came via the steamer service to Larne and stayed there or in Whitehead. Tourists could book trips to The Gobbins through their hotel, with each having certain days of the week for visiting with their own guide. Posters advertising The Gobbins were placed in Belfast tram carriages and at railway stations. Day-trippers were encouraged to travel to Ballycarry railway station for The Gobbins. From there they could walk or hire a local 'Irish jaunting car' to get to the path itself.

The entrance to The Gobbins cliff path – then as now – was nicknamed Wise's Eye after the path's creator. An oval-shaped hole bored in the rock, it was staffed by a railway company 'toll collector' from 10 am to 5 pm daily (including Sundays). Close to the entrance of the path two tearooms provided refreshments including strong tea, fried slices of ham, eggs, tomatoes, potato and soda bread, all of which were 'much appreciated' by visitors.

On summer days The Gobbins was 'busier than the footpath of Royal Avenue' – with visitors pushing to get past one another. Reviewers described an incredible experience:

"In many places the rocks rise to a height of two hundred feet, sometimes quite abruptly...every few steps a different view of cliff is disclosed. Surely there is something in the influence of the Irish climate which acts upon the rocks...The tints are softer and deeper...the very air is laden with a poetry…" "The Gobbins Cliff Path", The Sketch,17 December 1902

'There is, in short, nothing like The Gobbins anywhere else in the world…' Fennell W.J. (1902), "The Gobbins Cliff Path - Visit of the British Association to Belfast"

=== Decline of the first path at The Gobbins ===
The Gobbins cliff path required constant maintenance to cope with the impact of waves and storms. Following the Great Depression and the steady rise of competition from road transport, the railway company got into financial difficulties – by 1938 the Northern Counties Committee was losing £19,000 a year.

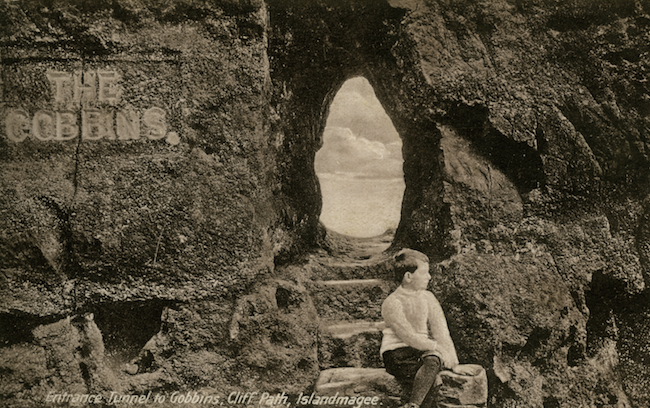
Wise's Eye at The Gobbins

The Gobbins cliff path was closed for a time in 1936, then during the Second World War there was an even more acute shortage of manpower and finance. As a result, no upkeep was carried out, apart from painting the railings black to avoid them acting as a landmark for German air-raids heading into Belfast.

After the war, The Gobbins cliff path was briefly reopened by the new Ulster Transport Authority, but closed in 1954. Several attempts were made by government and individuals to restore the path. Writer and filmmaker, John H. Lennon from Co Down was a particular champion. However lack of finance and scepticism about tourist numbers in the face of the conflict in Northern Ireland frustrated these attempts. The first Tubular Bridge finally collapsed into the sea in May 1981.

The remains of the path continued to be explored by climbers and walkers. However the cliffs were dangerous, and several people got into difficulties and had to be rescued during the 1980s, 1990s and 2000s.

== The Gobbins today ==
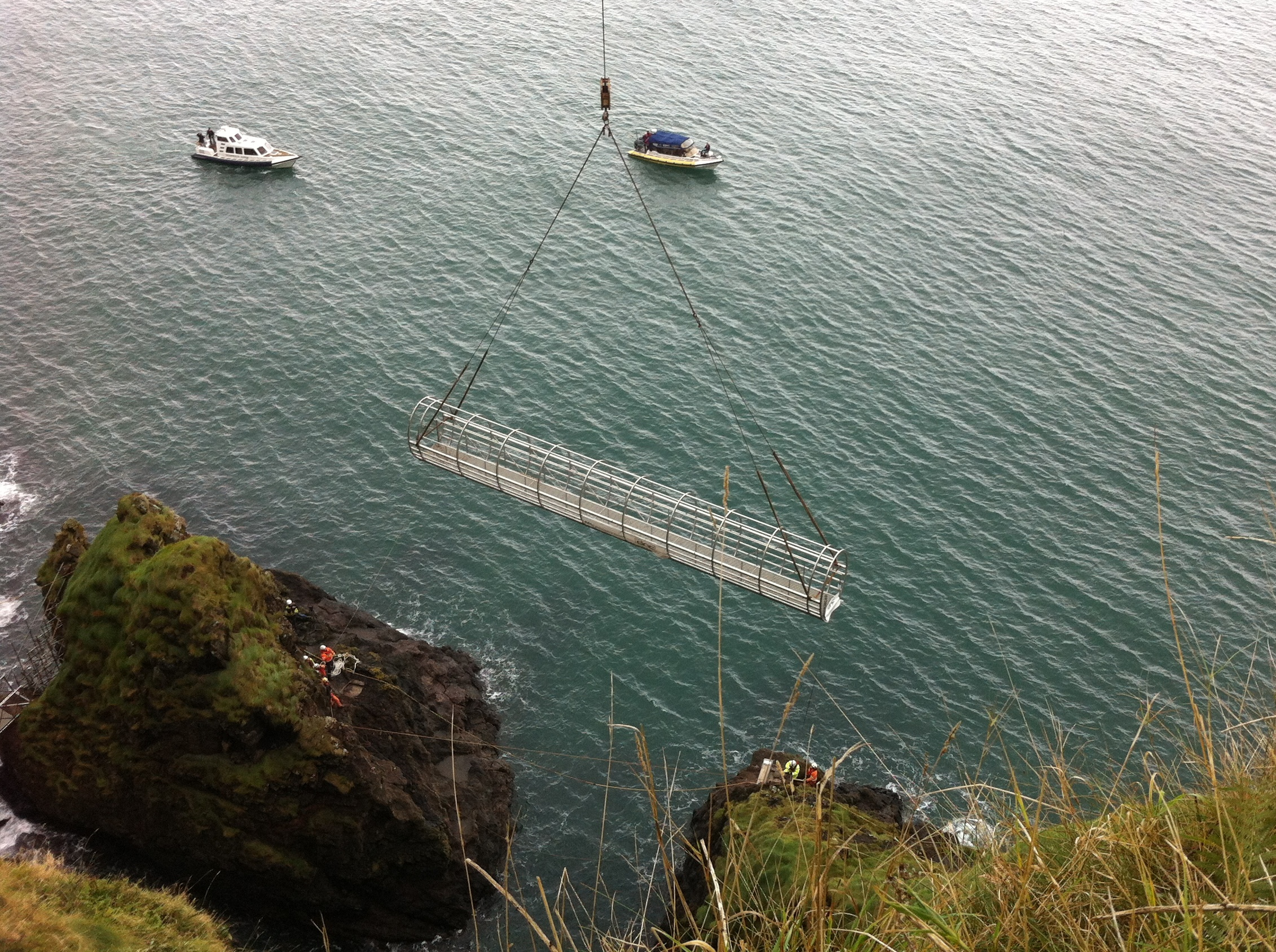
The new Tubular Bridge being craned into place at The Gobbins.

In 2011, after years of work, Larne Borough Council announced a plan to reopen The Gobbins cliff path. A series of 15 new bridges and six new gallery structures (which hug the side of the cliff) were constructed and installed during 2014–15. The reimagined path includes an iconic new Tubular Bridge. Weighing over 5.4 tonnes (5.3 long tons), it was craned into position on 22 October 2014.

Visitors can once again use the 22-metre-long (72 ft) tunnel, including a section which runs below sea-level. Four of the new bridges are over 30 metres (98 ft) in length. The project has also improved on Wise’s original work with a new cliff-top path, which offers views stretching as far as Ailsa Craig in Scotland, and a cantilevered platform and staircase providing viewing points over the first bridges to the north and Belfast Lough to the South.

The project cost £7.5 million with just under half of the funding coming through the European Union's Interreg IVA Programme, managed by the Special EU Programmes Body (SEUPB) and administered by the North East Partnership. Larne Borough Council provided £4 million support with further funding of £200,000 from Ulster Garden Villages Limited.

Tourism NI has contributed funding towards the cliff-top path, and a platform and staircase were funded by the North East Region Rural Development Programme. The Gobbins project is part of a cross-border project which also includes the enhancement of another tourist destination based in Sliabh Liag, County Donegal.

However, the path has very often been closed for a variety of reasons including planned works, rockfalls, storm damage, inspections. As of 2025 it had been closed for 46% of the time since 2015.

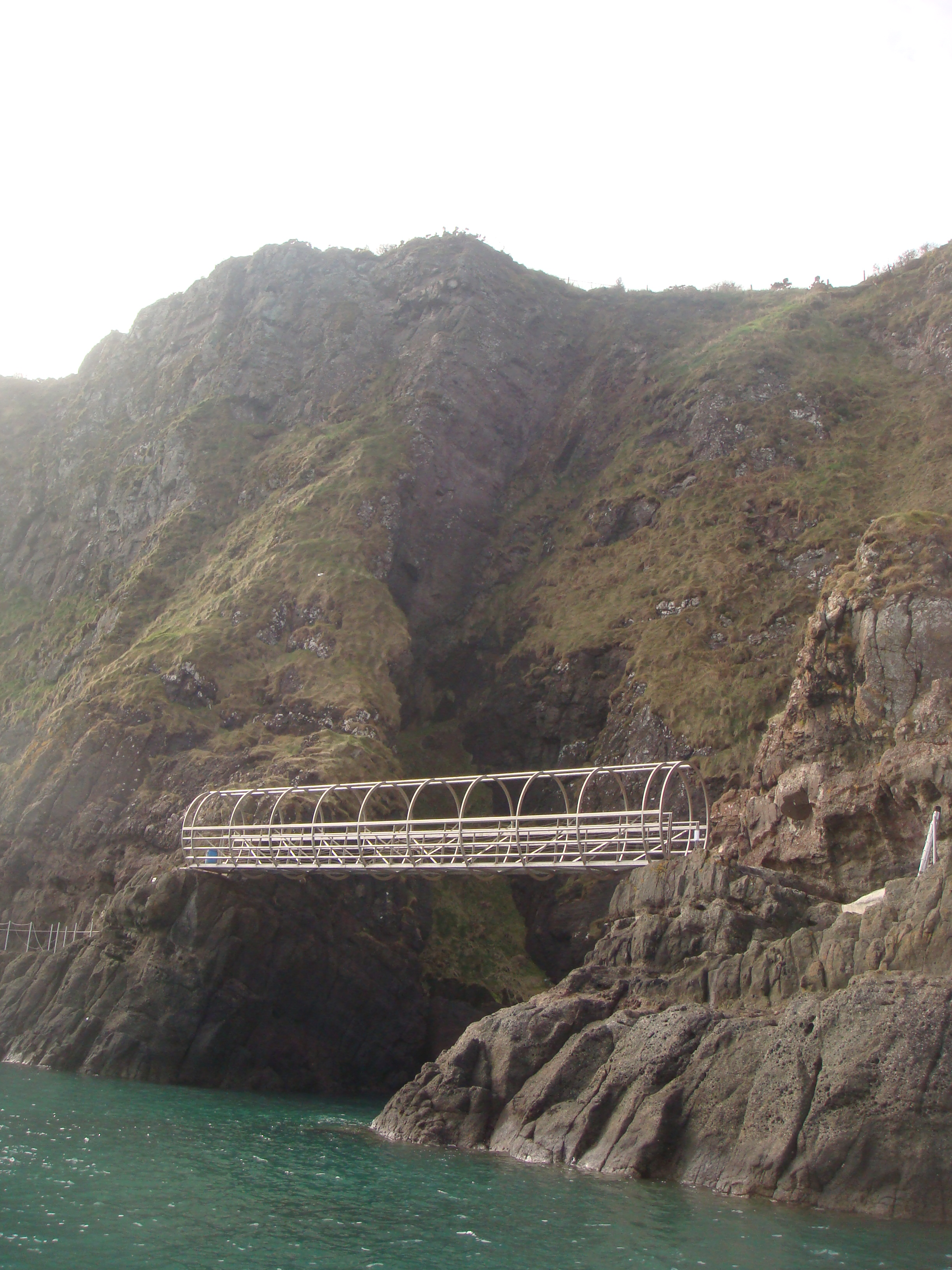
The Tubular Bridge at The Gobbins

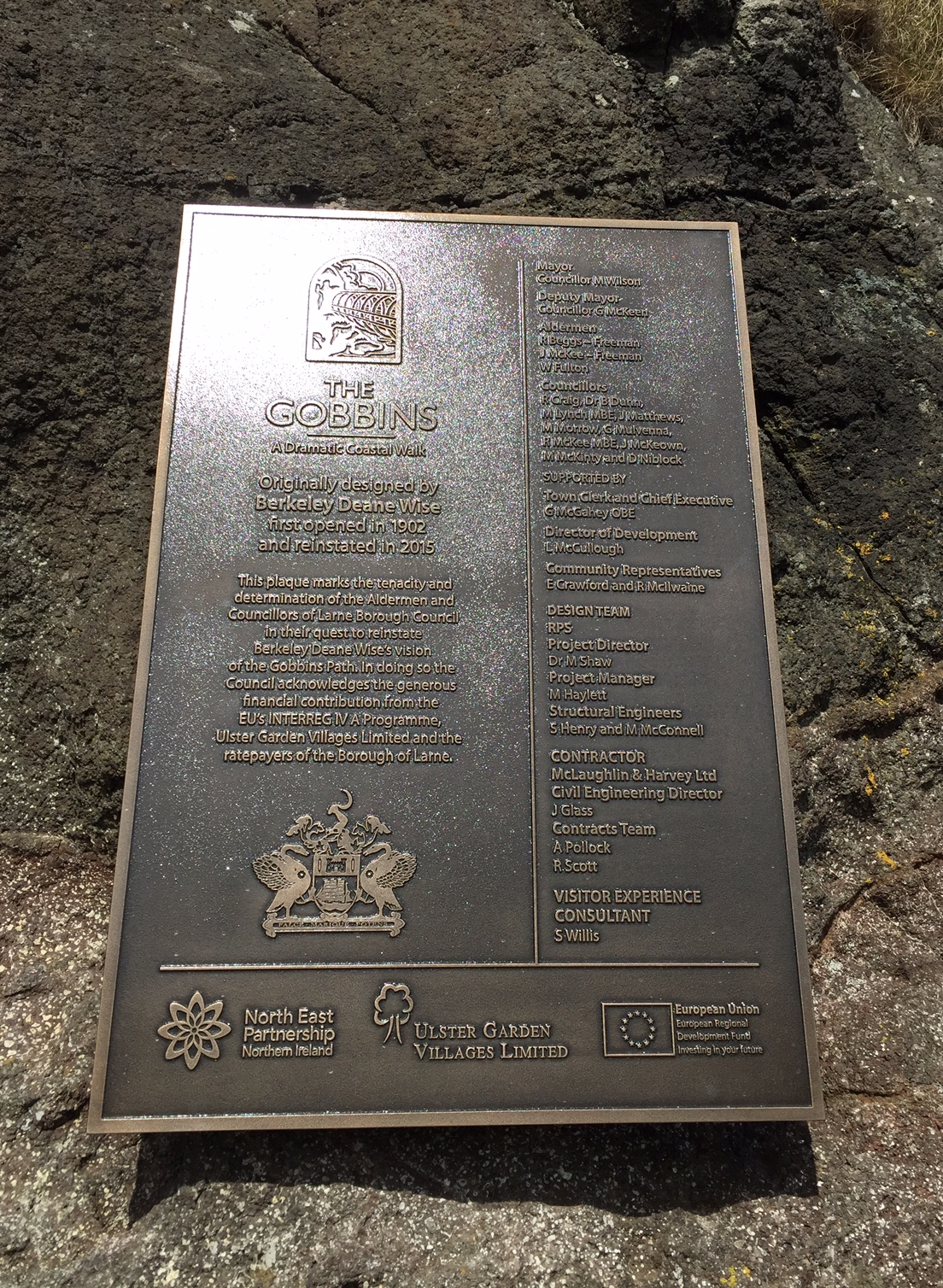
Plaque detailing the restoration of The Gobbins

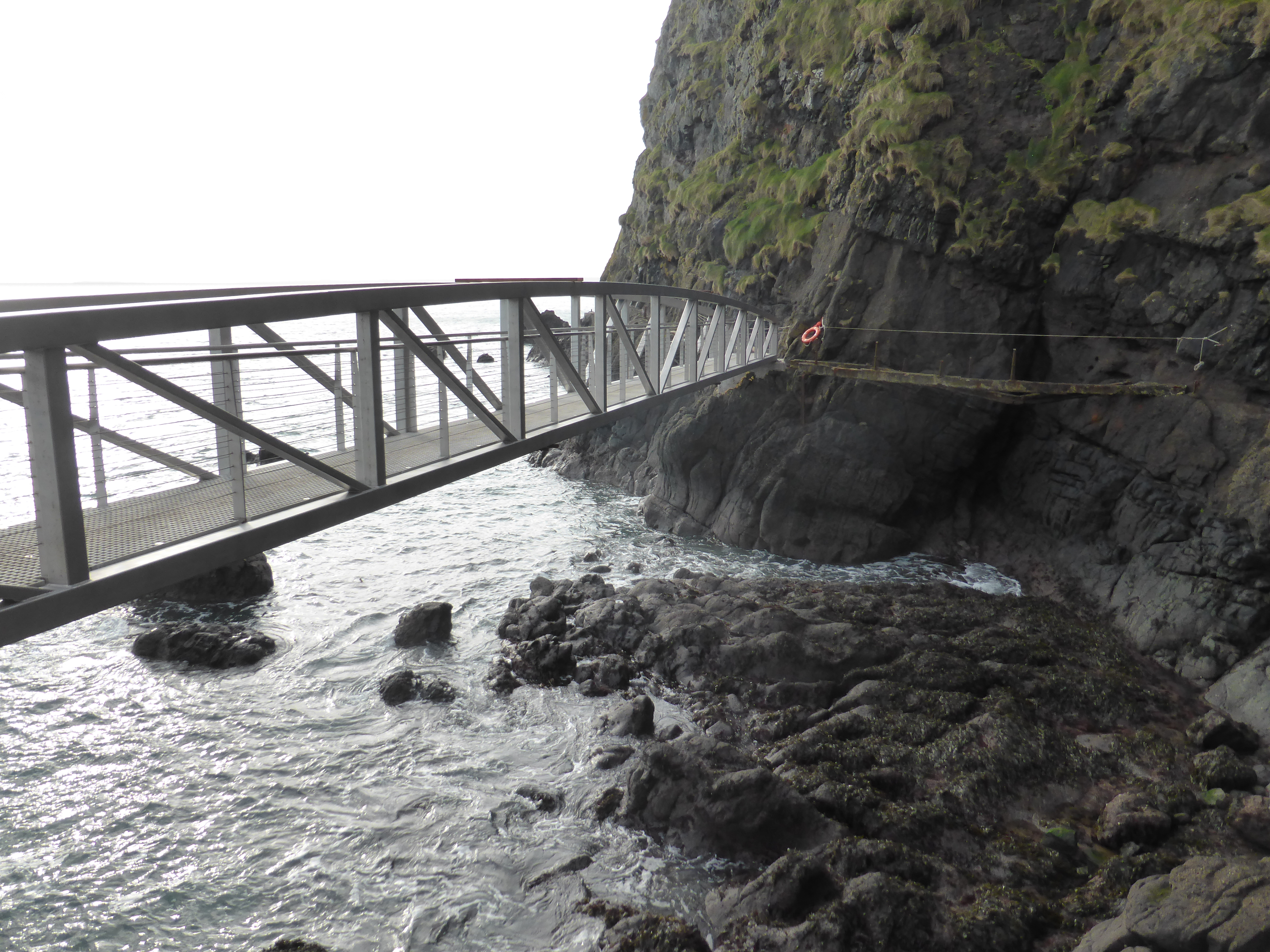
New bridge and old bridge remains at The Gobbins

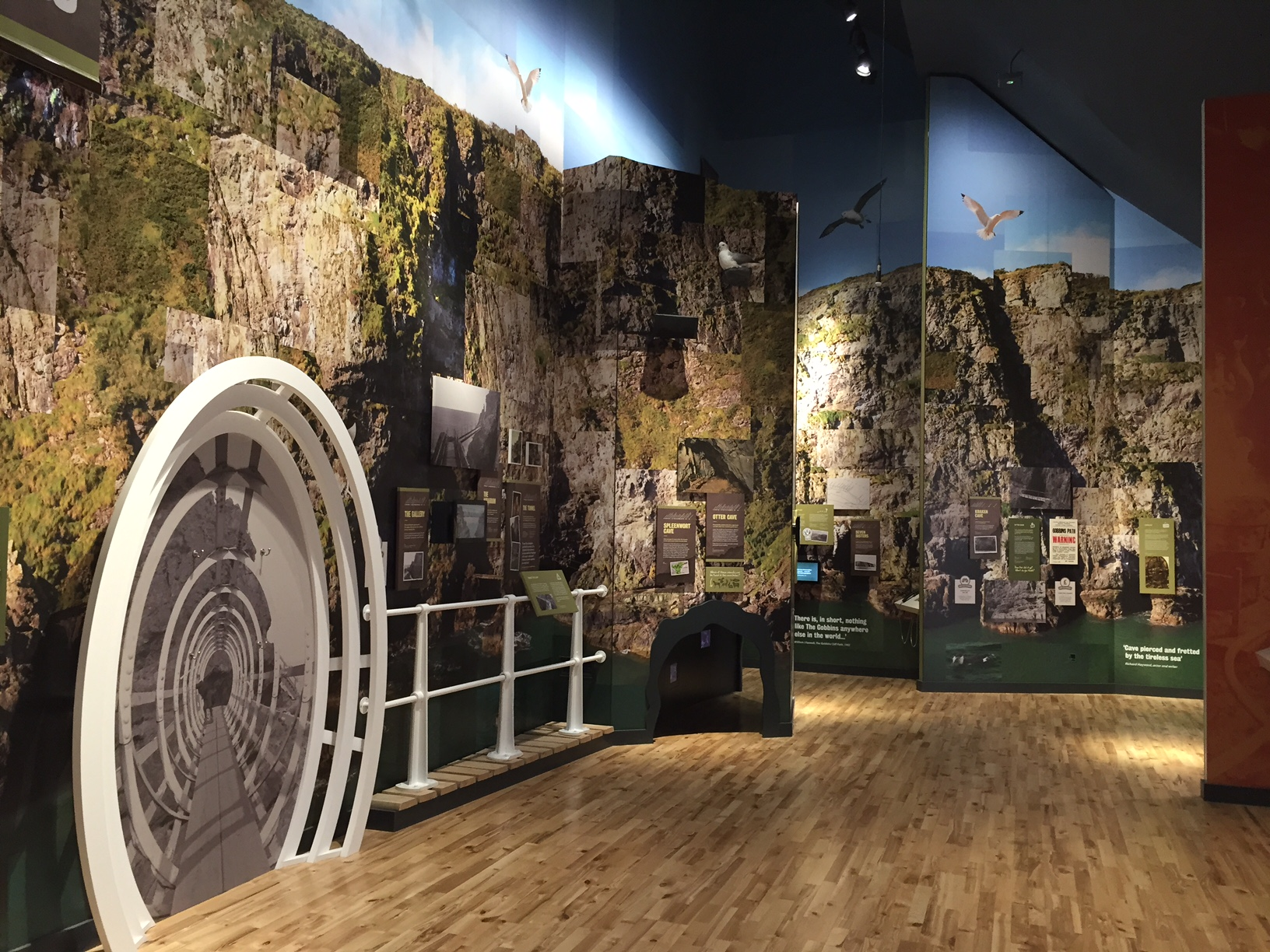
Exhibition area at The Gobbins Visitor Centre

== Similar Treks ==
- Caminito del Rey
- Tofana di Rozes
- Mount Ogden Via Ferrata
- Nelson Rocks
- Bove Path
- VF Ivano Dibona
- Karlsruher Grat

== Notes ==
- RPSI History/ Has a section about the Gobbins cliff path, Railway Preservation Society of Ireland, 12 October 2008, archived from the original on 16 July 2011
