= Karlsruher Grat =

Coordinates: 48°33′44″N 8°11′02″E

The Karlsruher Grat is a mountain ridge approximately 400 m long, situated near Ottenhöfen in the Black Forest in Germany. An alpine route with a climbing section passes along it. It is considered the only via ferrata in the Northern Black Forest.

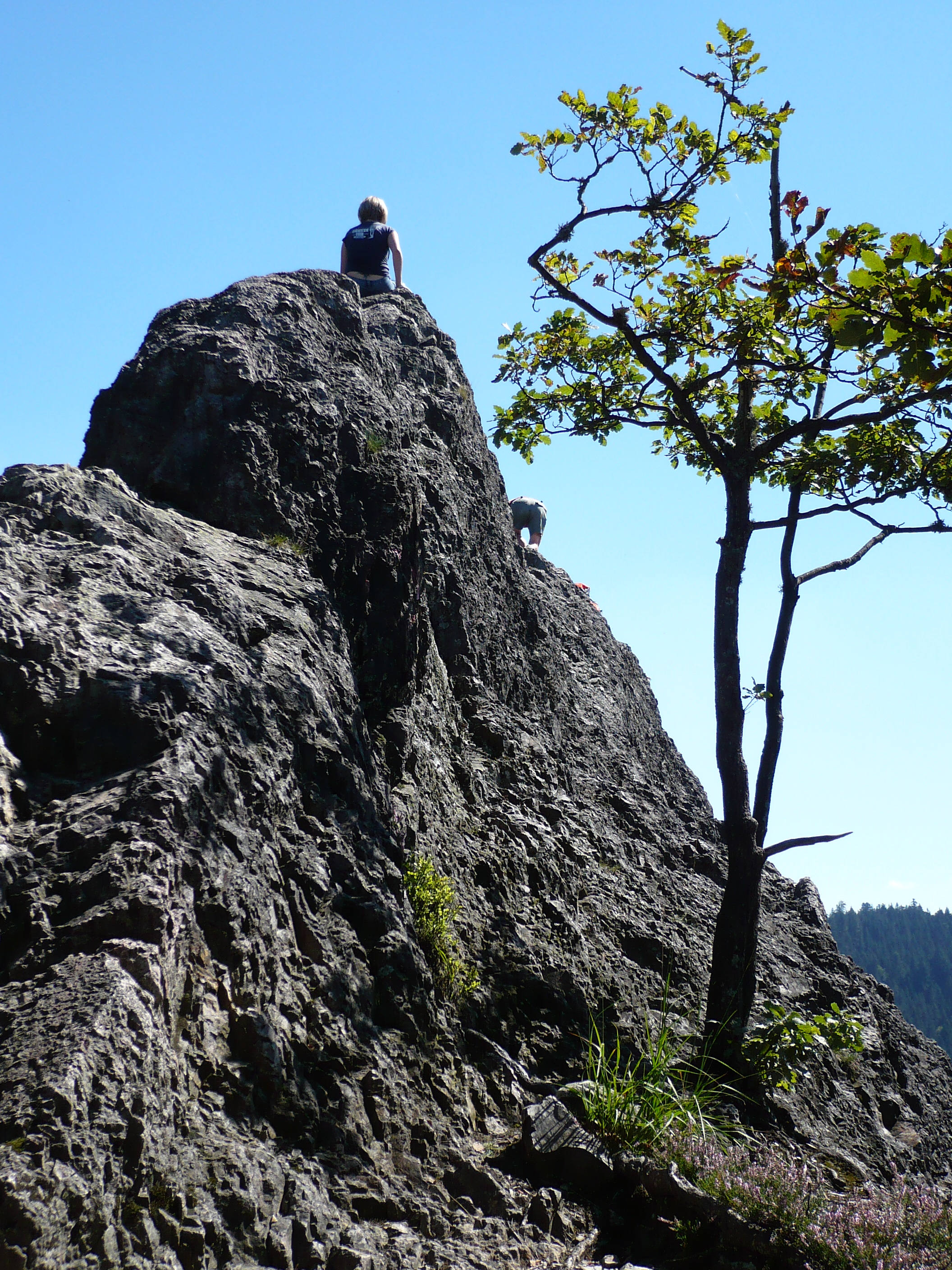
The Via Ferrata on the Karlsruher Grat

== Location ==
The Karlsruher Grat is situated in the nature reserve Gottschlägtal-Karlsruher Grat to the East of Ottenhöfen and southward of the Hornisgrinde in the Northern Black Forest. The nature reserve reaches from the western falls of the Melkerei and Vogelkopf at 400 meters up to 830 meters above sea level to the East. There the street Kreisstraße 5370, leading from Oppenau to Kloster Allerheiligen to the Schwarzwaldhochstraße, marks the border to the national park Black Forest and to the nature reserve Schliffkopf. The ridge runs at about 750 meters above the Gottschlägtal.

== Etymology ==
The name Karlsruher Grat, which literally means "Ridge of Karlsruhe", was not the initial name. The entire mountain ridge was once called Eichhalden Ridge because of its resemblance to a roof ridge. When the ridge became a popular attraction for the climbers from the local area, mainly from the Karlsruhe region, and the first fatal cases were reported, in 1926, the Ottenhöfen municipality named it in honour of the Karlsruhe victims.

== Geology ==
The rocks and ridge, which forms the Karlsruher Grat, consists of quartz porphyry, specifically the Grünberg-quartz porphyry of the Geisberg Formation, which was formed around 290 million years ago by the cooling of the magma which filled a 4 km long and 750m wide crevasse. In some areas, traces of the magma flow are still visible. The granite of the ground rock and the quartz porphyry, which eroded much later, were covered with thick deposits of river sediments, strata of red sandstone. The harder and thus more resilient porphyry formed a ridge (the Karlsruher Grat) as a result of erosion, while the other, softer rocks dissipated.

== Via Ferrata ==
The via ferrata is usually done starting in Ottenhöffen, and leads along the ridge from West to East over the often rough but hardwearing Porphyry rocks. Some sections of the alpine route are demanding and in some places exposed, but -- compared to alpine via ferratas -- aren't secured with metal ropes or standing aids.

The Karlsruher Grat is accessible via the Schwarzwaldhochstraße, but is mostly started from the walkers carpark at the Edelfrauen Waterfalls in Ottenhöfen. The path leads from the walkers carpark after the grovel works into the gorge of the Gottschlägbach, past a cave next to the Edelfrauengrab and countless waterfalls and then gradually uphill. Always straying to the left of the hillside, it then strikes left from a wide wood-fellers path further to the back of the gorge ad then onto the ridge itself. On top, signs reading "Kletterpartie" lead the way. From the Bosensteiner Eck one follows the blue route downhill to the west and after a few hundred meters one is confronted with the first Porphyry rocks.

The route is not marked, meaning one can mold the route itself to ones skill set, staying close or straying away from the ridge. Steady feet and a calm head are a necessity for a successful attempt. One should also avoid the ridge after wet weather. The route usually requires around half an hour to one full hour, dependent on ones skill set. A small forest path with which one can steer away from the harder parts of the ridge is more suitable for beginners. Apart from the via ferrata, climbing is only allowed on one particular part of the ridge: the Eichhaldenfirst.

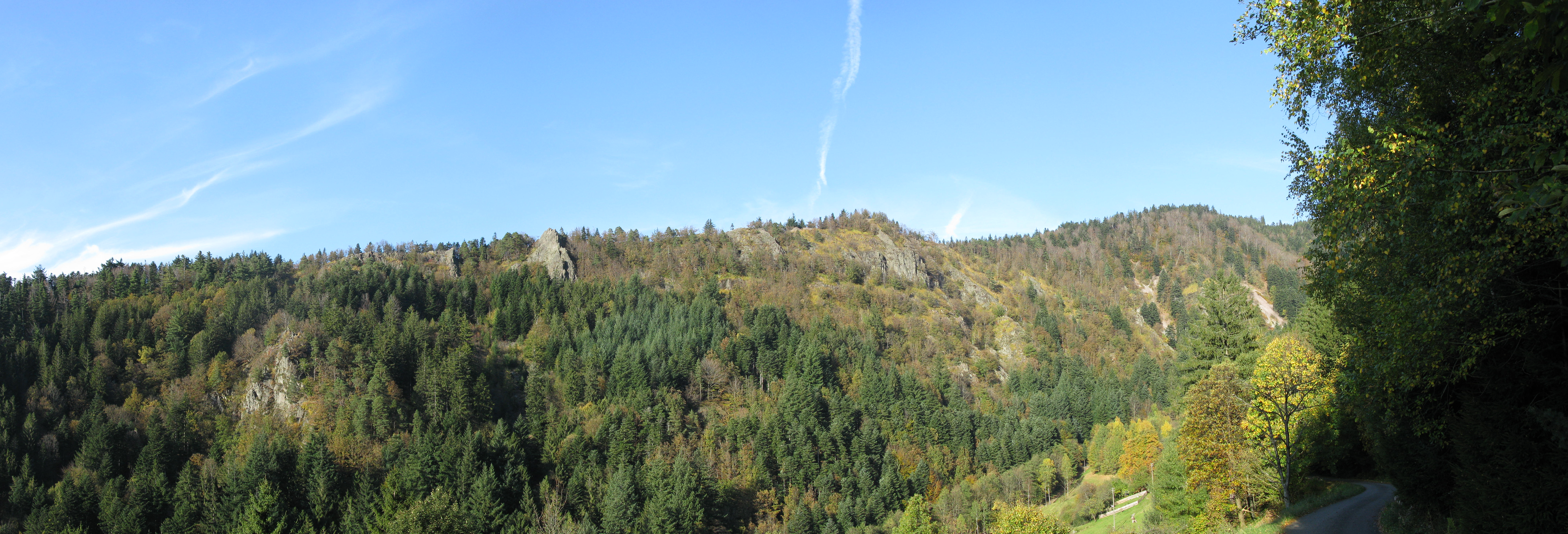
Panoramic view of the Karlsruher Grat

== Locations nearby ==
Nearby attractions are (in the direction of Ottenhöfen): the Granit Walls of the Brente Schofen with a pleasant view over Ottenhöfen and the Gottschlägbach-Waterfalls. Legend has it that there, the wife of the lord of the castle of Bosenstein was caved in alive. In the direction of Oppenau, there are the ruins of the monastery of Allerheiligen and its waterfalls. All of these destinations can be combined with the Karlsruher Grat to equal a walk of about 15 kilometers.

== Literature ==
Otto F. Geyer, Manfred Gwinner, Matthias Geyer, Edgar Nitsch und Theo Simon: Geologie von Baden-Württemberg. 5th edition, 627 p, Schweizerbart, Stuttgart 2011, ISBN 978-3-510-65267-9.

== Similar Treks ==
- Bove Path
- Caminito del Rey
- Tofana di Rozes
- The Gobbins
- Mount Ogden Via Ferrata
- Nelson Rocks
- VF Ivano Dibona
