= Tofana di Rozes =

Mountain of the Dolomites in the province of Belluno, Veneto, Italy

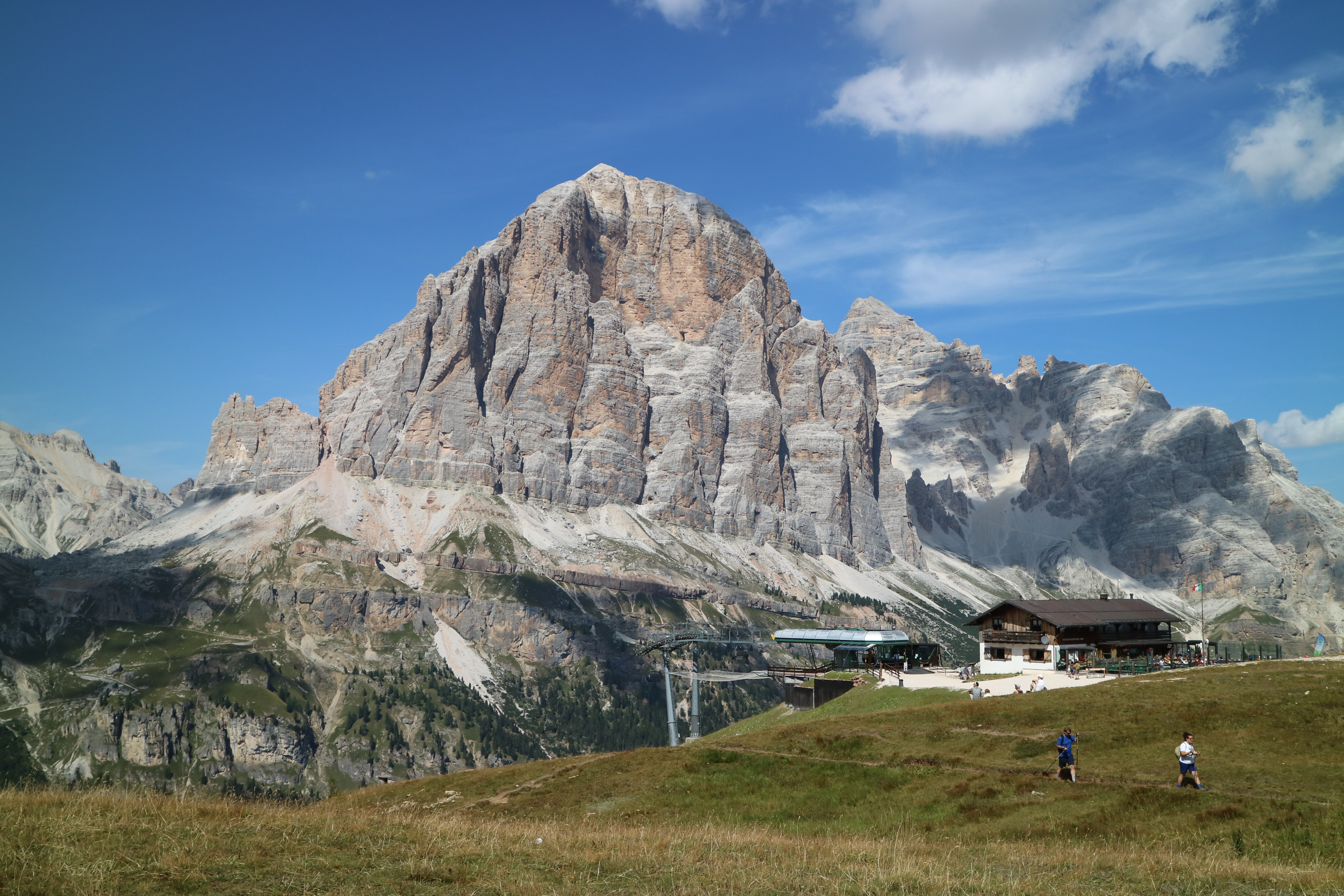
- Tofana di Rozes

Highest point
- Elevation: 3,225 m (10,581 ft)
- Prominence: 664 m (2,178 ft)
- Listing: Alpine mountains above 3000 m
- Coordinates: 46°32′13″N 12°03′04″E

Geography
- Location within Alps
- Location: Italy
- Parent range: Dolomites

Climbing
- First ascent: 1864

Tofana di Rozes (3,225 metres (10,581 ft)) is a mountain of the Dolomites in the Province of Belluno, Veneto, Italy. Located west of the resort of Cortina d'Ampezzo, the mountain's giant three-edged pyramid shape and its vertical south face, above the Falzarego Pass, makes it the most popular peak in the Tofane group, and one of the most popular in the Dolomites.

== History ==
From May 1915 to July 1916, the mountain and its surroundings was the location of fierce fighting between Italian and German, later Austrio-Hungarian, troops, as part of the Italian front in World War I.

West of the main face, and separated from the mountain by a steep and rocky gully, is the Castelletto, a narrow, long rock 700 feet high. In 1915 it was occupied by a German platoon, which, armed with a machine gun and sniper rifles, wreaked havoc on the Italian troops in the valley. They were soon replaced by Austrian soldiers, and from their strategic position they prevented any Italian plans for a push north. For the Alpini, the Italian mountain infantry specialists, retaking the Castelletto became a prime objective. Two of their climbers, Ugo Vallepiana and Giuseppe Gaspard, climbed up the Tofana to a ledge a few hundred feet above the Castelletto, but their guns were not very successful. One summer night four Alpini climbed up the Castelletto but they were discovered and shot. An attack through the gully, taking advantage of the morning fog, was also unsuccessful (machine gunners shot the advancing soldiers when the fog thinned a little), as was a massive attack from three sides in the fall of 1915. So, in February 1916 the Italians, led by Lt. Luigi Malvezzi, started tunneling into the Castelletto, first with hammers and chisels and then, in March, with pneumatic drills, and with teams of over two dozen men, working four six-hour shifts, they tunneled up to 30 feet per day. The steep tunnel was 500 meters long, and 2,200 cubic meters of rubble were removed. Its adit was in a "sheltered position within a natural ravine", accessed by a long ladder and thus logistically very demanding. One part of the tunnel brought them under the Austrian position, where they filled a cavern, 16 by 16 feet and 7 feet high, with 77,000 pounds of gelignite. The other led to what was to be an attack position, to be opened with a smaller batch of explosives.

On July 11, at 3:30 AM, the gelignite was exploded, with King Victor Emmanuel III and the army's chief of staff, General Luigi Cadorna, looking on. The Austrian commander was Hans Schneeberger, an orphan from Brandberg, Tyrol, who at age 19 replaced a commander who had been killed by an Italian sniper. When the explosions happened, some two dozen Austrian soldiers were killed instantly, but Schneeberger and a few survivors had rifles and grenades, and were able to repel the Italians from the edge of the crater. The attack as a whole was a failure: soldiers were to lower themselves from the Tofana to attack the Castelletto, but the explosion destroyed their ropes. To make matters worse, the explosion used up so much oxygen that Malvezzi and his men, going through the attack tunnel, passed out because of toxic gases including carbon monoxide; some of the men died. Finally, the explosion damaged the rock face on the east, sending huge boulders down the gully and killing incoming Italian soldiers. The next day, Italians had hauled machine guns up the face of the Tofana; Schneeberger sent one of his men to ask for reinforcements, which arrived that night. A few hours later the Italians attacked the relief platoon, and the Austrians withdrew to the Castelletto's northern end, and pulled their troops away altogether after a few days. Malvezzi received the Military Order of Savoy.

== Climbing ==
Most climbs start from the north, where the mountain is a relatively easy hike, or the west face, where the summit can be reached by a via ferrata. The south face, however, is a much more difficult challenge, with many of the routes being either fifth or sixth graded climbs. The mountain was first climbed in 1864 by Paul Grohmann and local hunter Francesco Lacedelli. The south face was first climbed in 1901.

=== Via Ferrata ===
A via ferrata starts at the restored entrance to the mine tunnel at the Castelletto, and leads to the summit of the mountain; along the way one finds a memorial to Giovanni Lipella, an Italian soldier who died on the mountain on 15 June 1918 and was posthumously awarded the Gold Medal of Military Valour.

== Cave ==
The Grotta di Tofana is one of only a few natural caves in dolomite rather than regular limestone. It is accessible by way of a via ferrata that starts some 40 minutes from Rifugio Dibona. The cave is some 300 meters deep, and the roof is up to 10 meters high. The cave has been quite popular with tourists, and was listed by Baedeker as "a large cavern accessible by ladders" and as an interesting visit.

== Similar Treks ==
- Alta Via 1
- Alta Via 2
- Caminito del Rey
- The Gobbins
- Mount Ogden Via Ferrata
- Nelson Rocks
- Bove Path
- VF Ivano Dibona
- Karlsruher Grat
