= VF Ivano Dibona =

Hiking trail in the Italian Dolomites mountains

The start of VF Ivano Dibona at Forcella Staunies

The Sentiero Ferrato Ivano Dibona is a challenging high alpine route along the Zurlon ridge, the main crest on Cristallo, a mountain group in the Italian Dolomites, northeast of Cortina d'Ampezzo, in the province of Belluno, Veneto, Italy. The use of a via ferrata set is recommended. The via ferrata is very well known because of the dolomitic scenery and the panoramic view.

== History ==
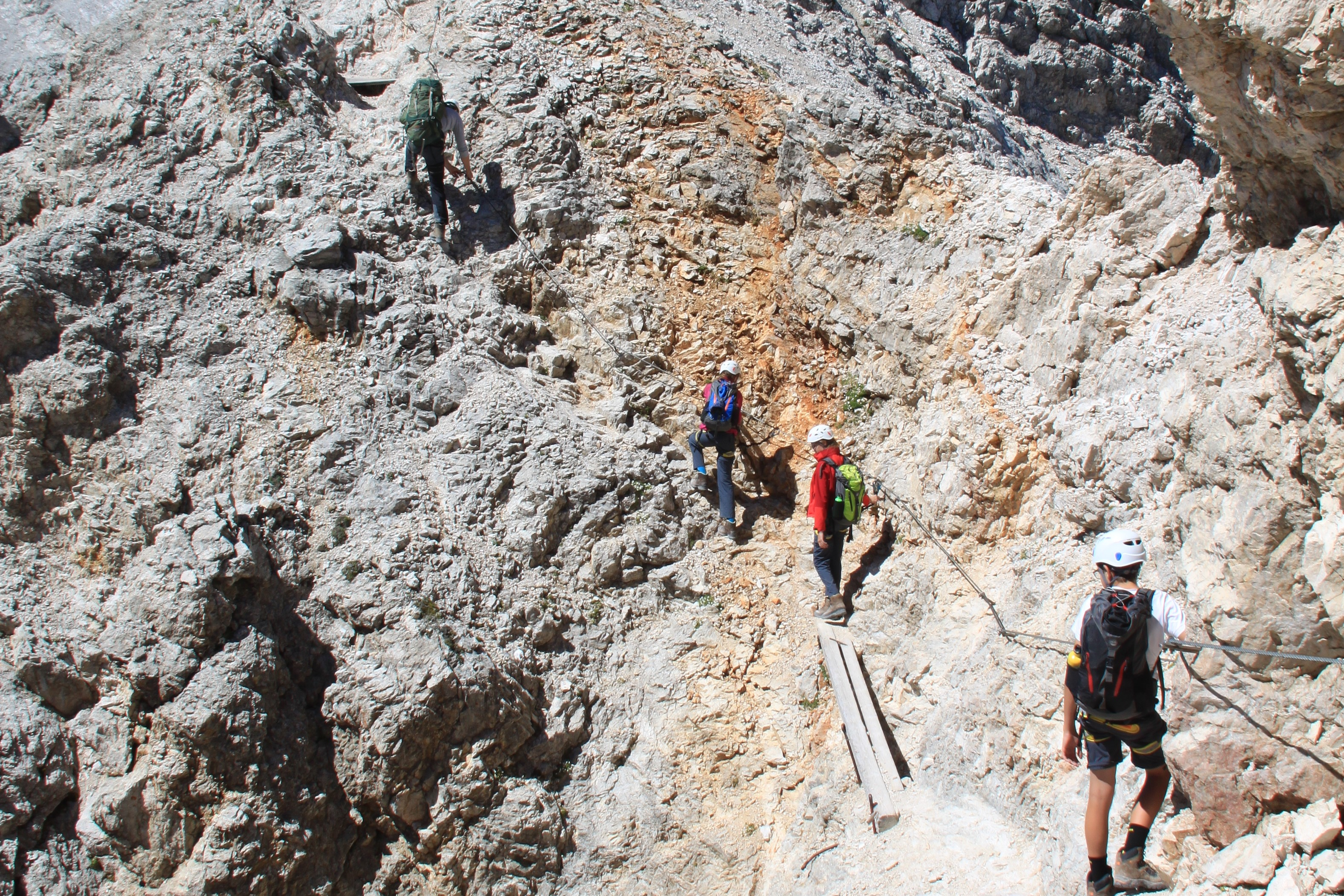
At the beginning of the VF Ivano Dibona at approx. 3000m.

The Ivano Dibona is a restored historical route, which was used by Italian troops during World War I. The route was re-explored in the 1960s by mountain guides and brothers Alfredo ‘Fredy’ or ‘Fredi’ and Ivano Dibona, grandsons of famed Italian mountaineer Angelo Dibona, and following Ivano’s death subsequently made safe for tourists, and reopened in September 1970. It was named after Ivano Dibona, younger brother of Fredi, who had perished while guiding a client on Cristallo on August 8, 1968 at the age of 25. Ivano was guiding client Professor Antonello Muratori, a lecturer at the University of Genoa, on the Cima Grande di Lavaredo, along the Spigolo Dibona route when they both lost their lives. Remains of military constructions from 1915 to 1917 are still visible along the route: casemate, barracks and ladders.

== Route details ==
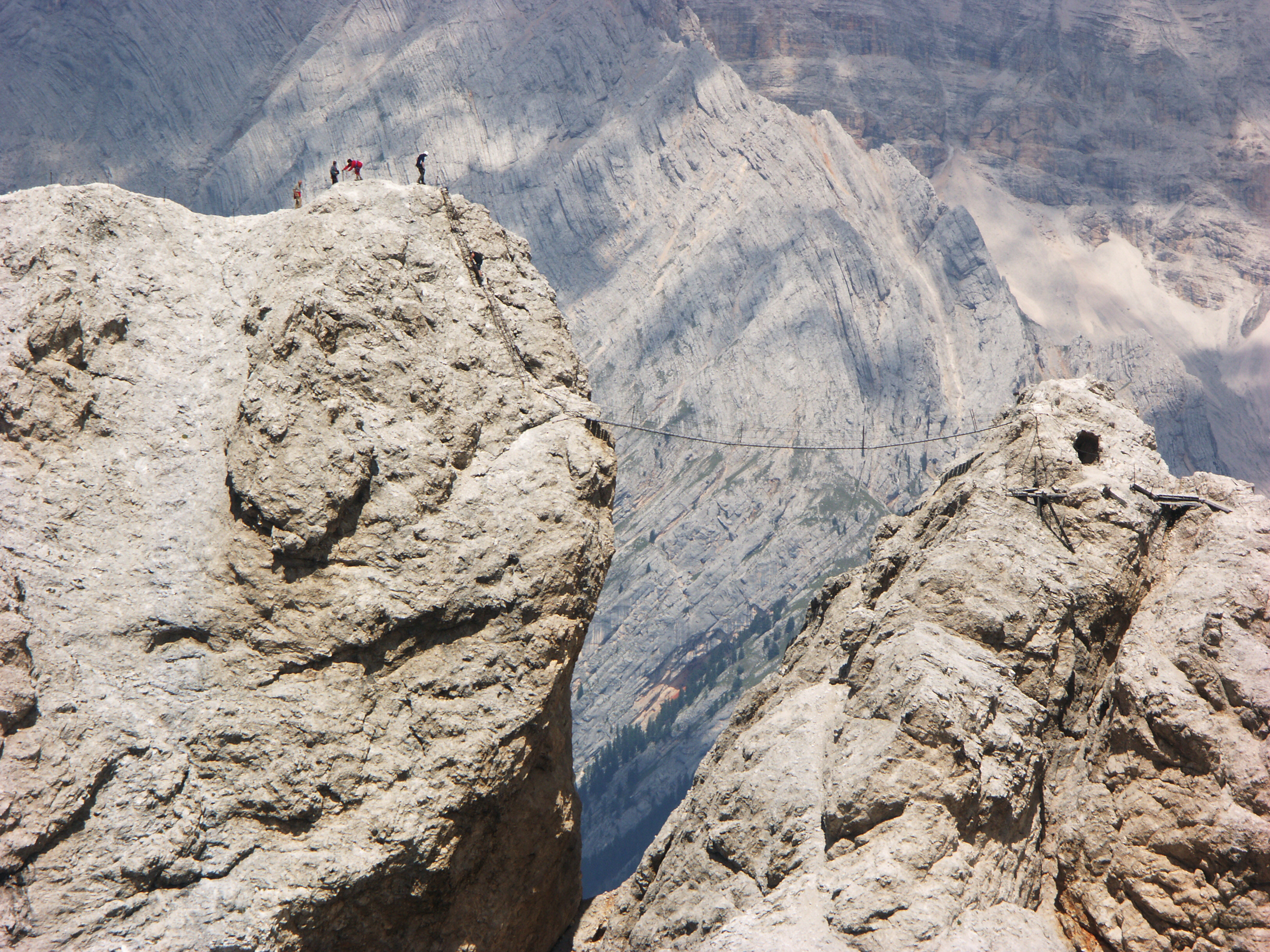
Ponte Cristallo

The route starts from Forcella Staunies (2,919 m), the top of the cable car (not in operation since 2016 - there is only one lift from Capanna Rio Gero to Rifugio Son Forca) at Cristallo's south side, and ends at Rifugio Ospitale in the Val Felizon. It takes about four hours to walk from Capanna Rio Gero (1698 m) below Passo Tre Croci to the start of the via ferrata at the Forcella Staunies for the ascent, which is arduous in the last part due to loose scree. The VF Ivano Dibona is not a climbing route, but follows the mountain ridge, via ladders, tunnels and bridges. The exposed parts are supplied with steel wires typical for via ferratas, while the parts that originally were difficult are supplied with remedies to make them accessible for walkers.

From the start at Forcella Staunies is some upward ladder climbing, a short tunnel, and then the bridge Ponte Cristallo, 27 meters long, and the longest via ferrata suspension bridge in the Dolomites. The bridge was shown in the action film Cliffhanger from 1993. The peak Cristallino d'Ampezzo (3,008 m) can be climbed via a short side route from the main Ivano Dibona.

Further the route goes down to Forcella Grande (2,870 m), and passes Forcella Padeon (2,760 m), Forcella Alta (2,687 m), and Forcella Bassa, and along the ridge to the peaks Zurlon (2,363 m), and Col di Stombi (2,168 m), and finally down to Ospitale.

The total height difference of the tour is 1000 m in the ascent and 1720 m in the descent. In early summer, remains of hard snow can be a danger. There are refreshment stops in Rio Gere, at the Rifugio Son Forca and in Ospitale. There is an unmanaged shelter in the Forcella Padeon.

== Gallery ==
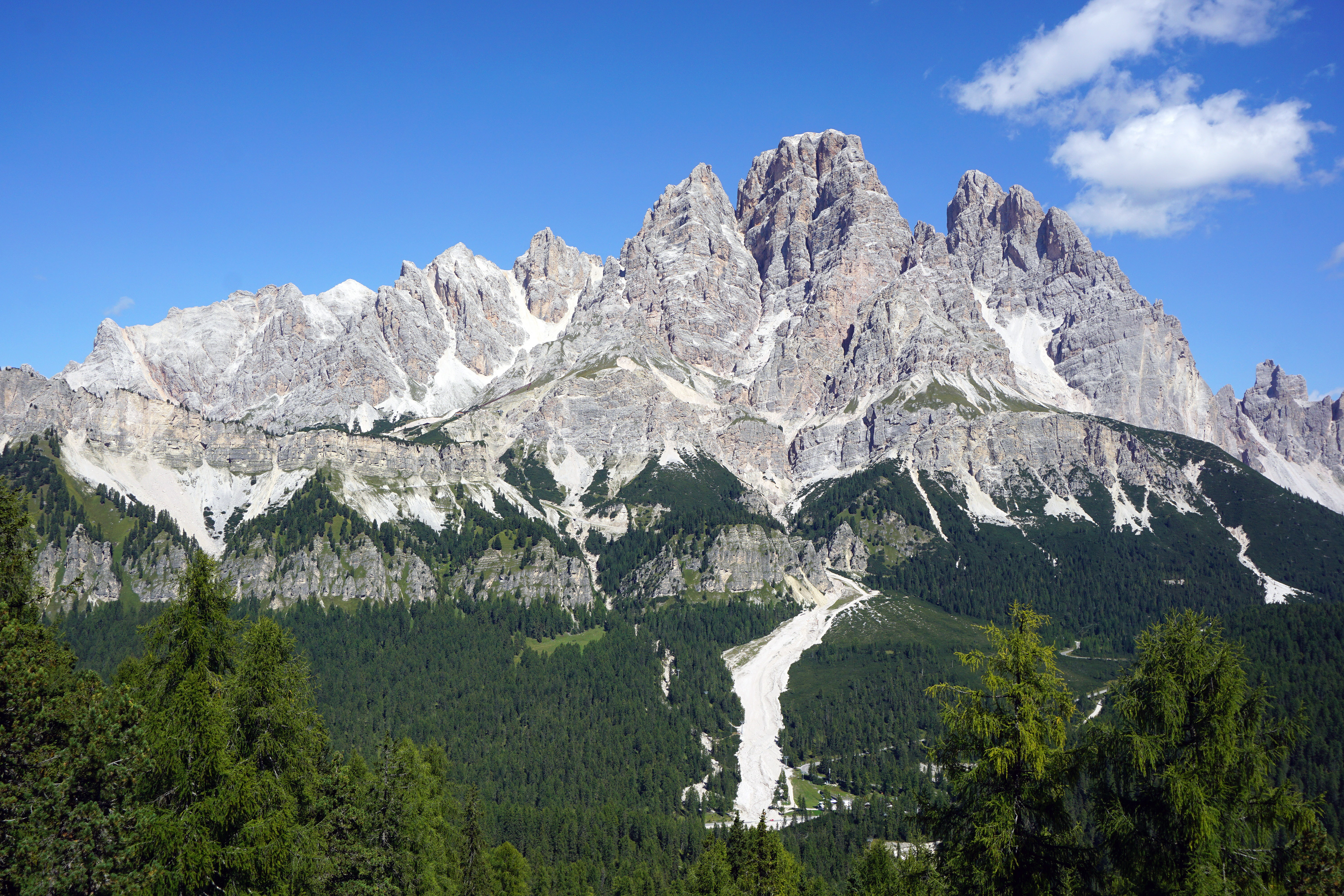
Monte Cristallo

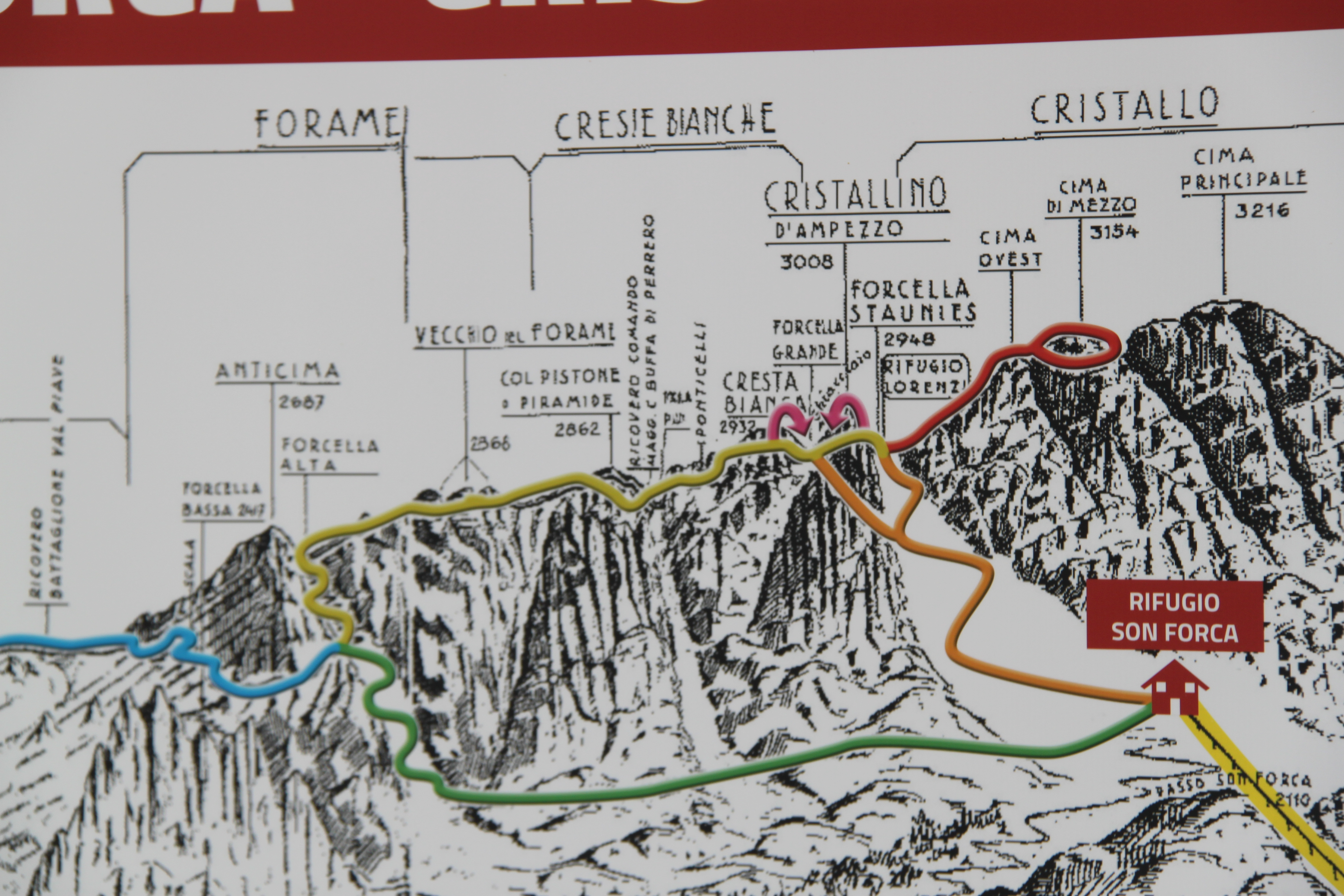
VF Ivano Dibona (yellow and blue)

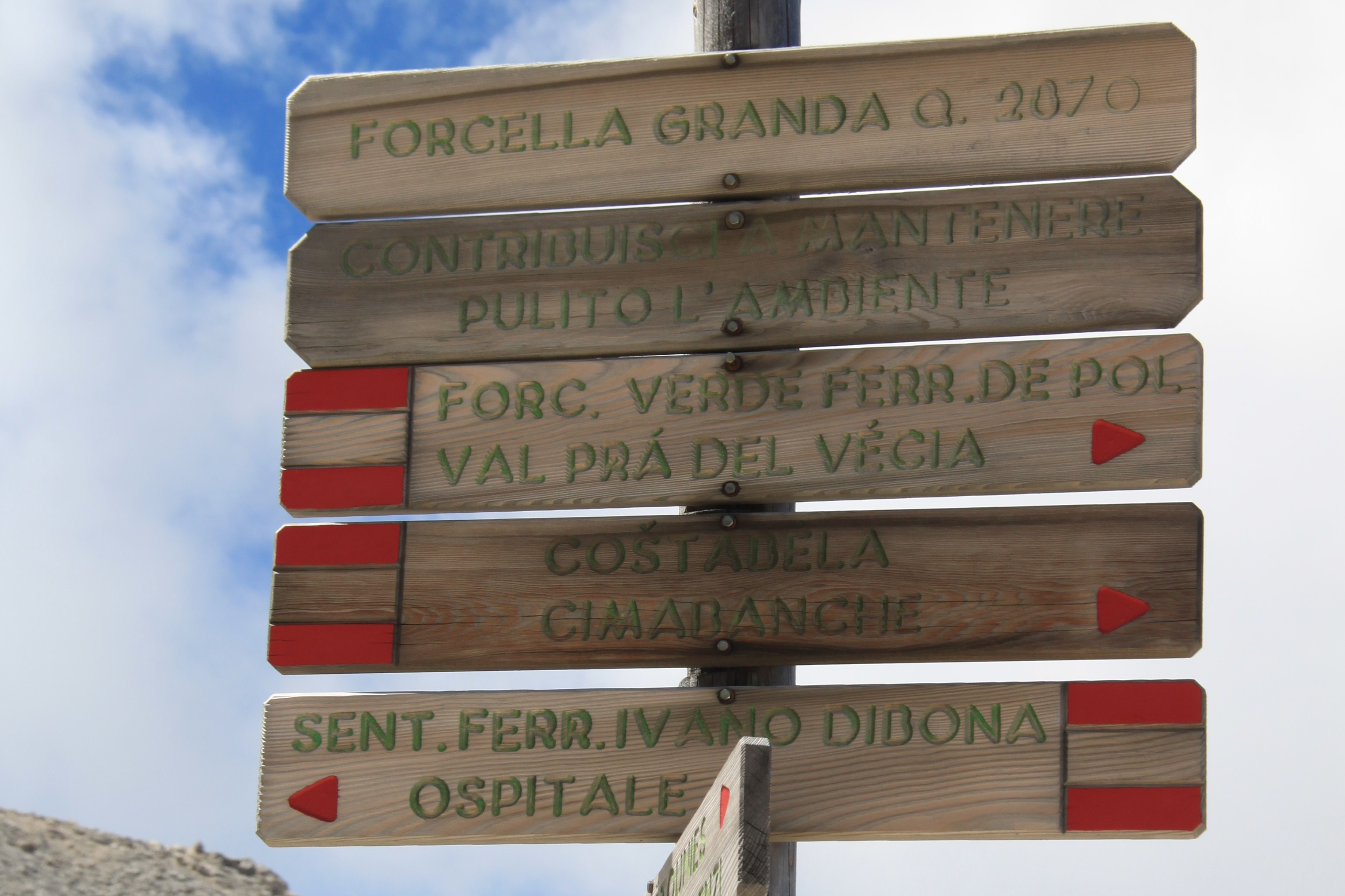
Forcella Granda, 2870m

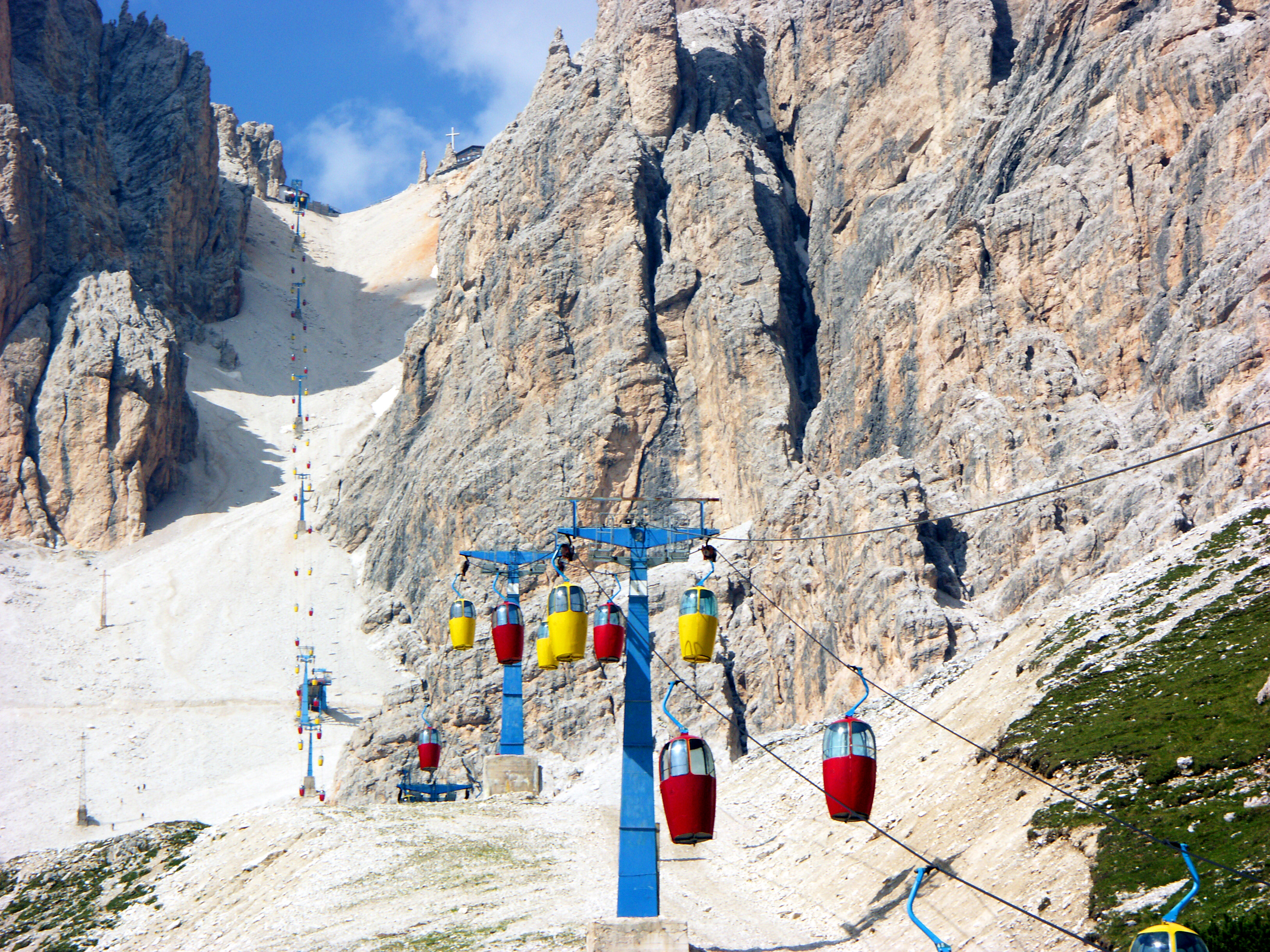
Forcella Staunies

== Similar Treks ==
- Bove Path
- Caminito del Rey
- Tofana di Rozes
- The Gobbins
- Mount Ogden Via Ferrata
- Nelson Rocks
- Karlsruher Grat
