= Mount Ogden Via Ferrata =

- Canyon
- The Mount Ogden Via Ferrata and training wall at Waterfall Canyon.
- Coordinates: 41°11′59.79″N 111°52′56.78″W
- Location: Weber County, Utah
- Formed by: Wasatch Range
- Geology: Limestone
- Highest elevation: 2,917 ft (889 m)

The Mount Ogden Via Ferrata hiking and climbing experience in Waterfall Canyon, is an outdoor recreation area located in Ogden City of Weber County, Utah. The privately owned climbing area is open for guided climbing tours only.

The mountainous site in Waterfall Canyon is known for its sheer rock walls, beautiful views of Weber County and the City of Ogden. It features a guided Via Ferrata climbing experience including a beginning training wall.

Rock climbing was once common there; climbers may now climb only if guided by approved climbing guides.

== See also ==
- Via Ferrata

== Similar Treks ==
- Caminito del Rey
- Tofana di Rozes
- The Gobbins
- Nelson Rocks
- Bove Path
- VF Ivano Dibona
- Karlsruher Grat
