= El Chorro =

- Village
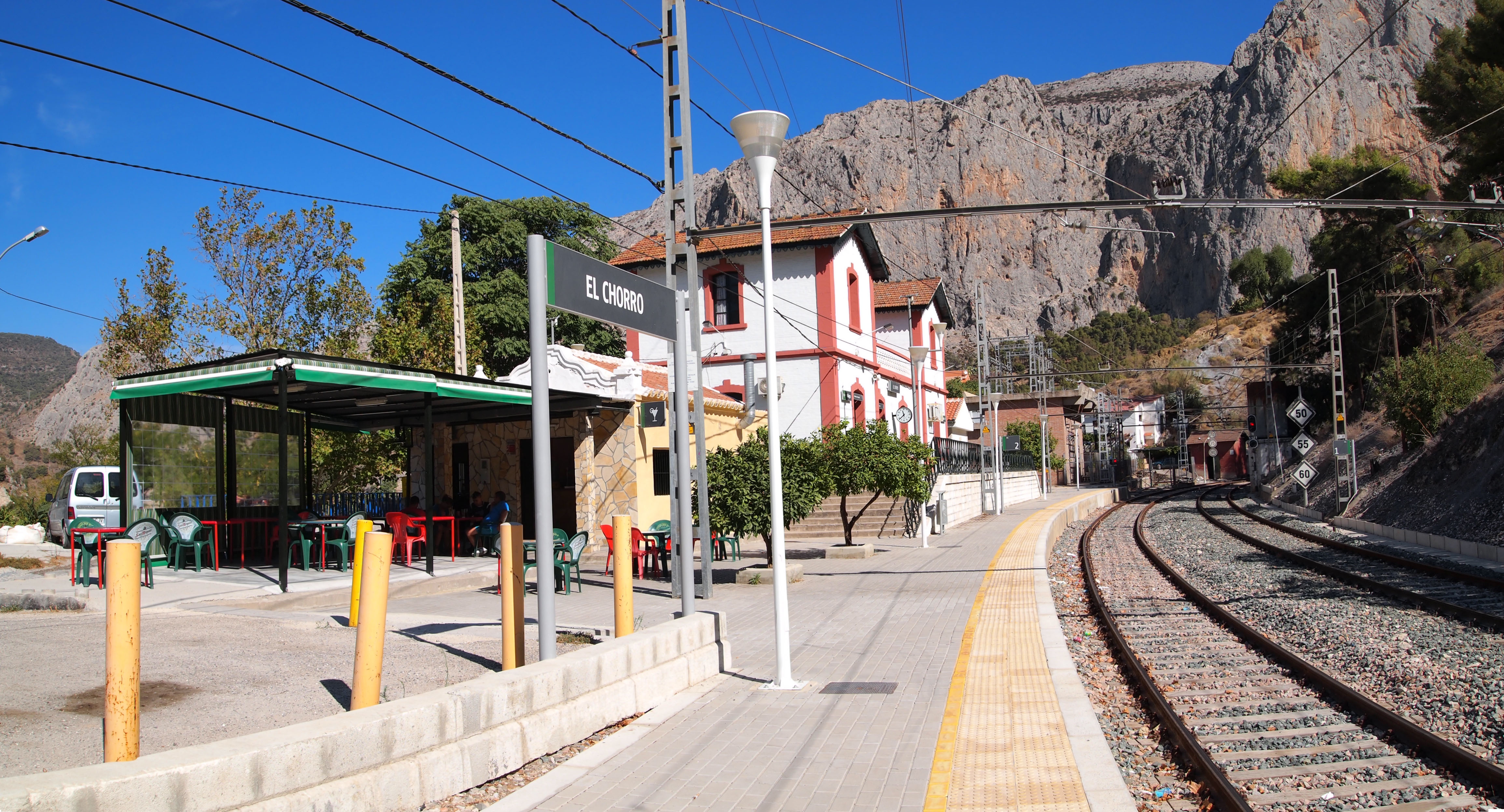
- El Chorro Railway station

- Municipal location in the Province of Málaga

- Location in Spain
- Country: Spain
- Autonomous community: Andalusia
- Province: Málaga
- Comarca: Valle del Guadalhorce

Population (2012)
  - Total: 245
- Time zone: UTC+1 (CET)
  - Summer (DST): UTC+2 (CEST (GMT +2))
- Area code: +34 (Spain)

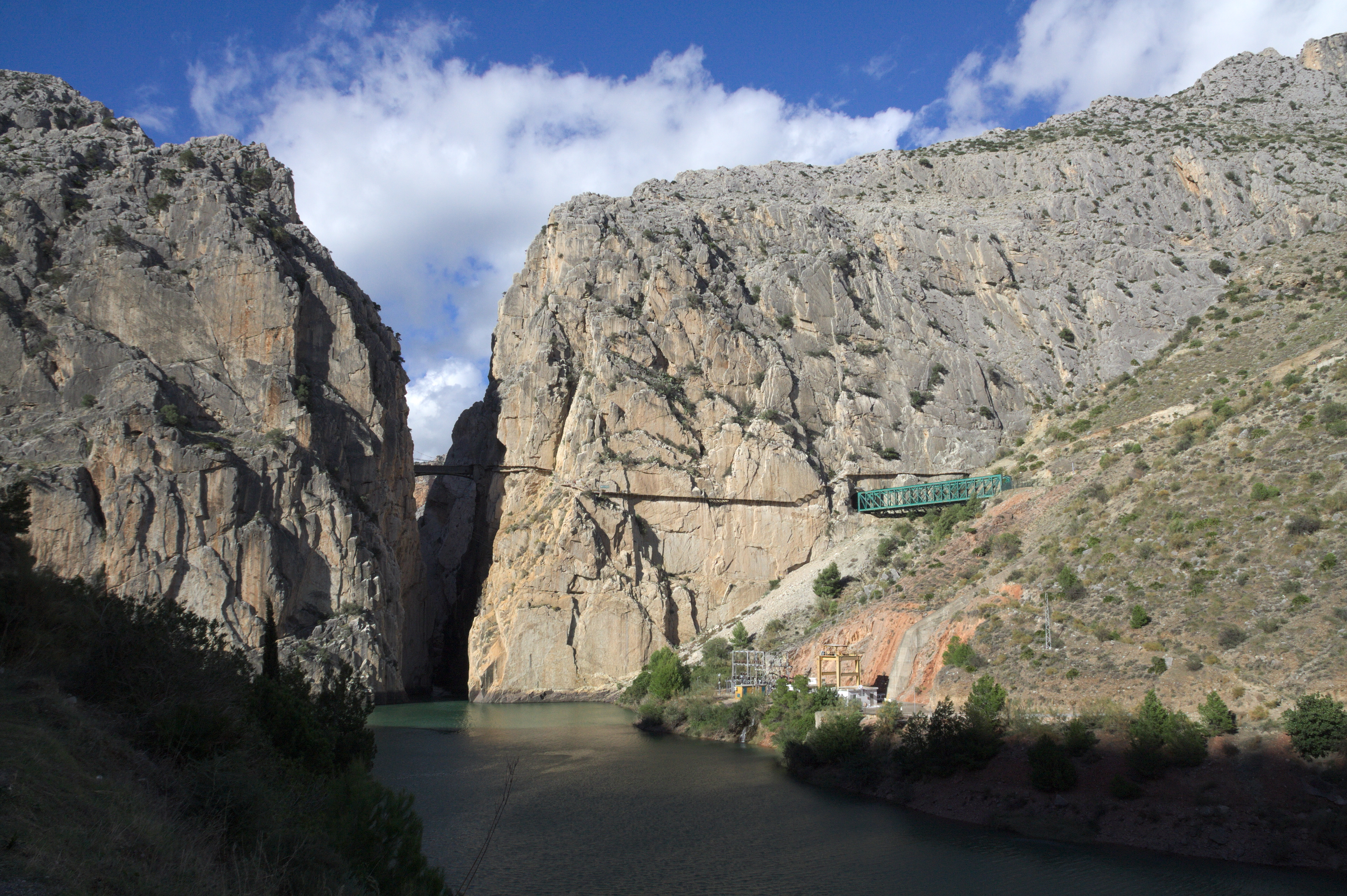
El Chorro: Entrance to Gaitanes Gorge

El Chorro ("The Cascade") is a small village located in Málaga (Andalusia) in southern Spain, near the town of Álora. It is one of the most popular rock climbing attractions in Spain as it is located next to Desfiladero de los Gaitanes ("Gorge of the Gaitanes"), This village is also frequented by mountain bikers, hikers, and campers.

== Gorge of the Gaitanes ==
The gorge is famous for a scary walkway called Caminito del Rey (King's Pathway) which hangs 100m above the base of the gorge. The path provided access to a hydro-electric system and took its name from an official visit by Alfonso XIII of Spain in 1921. Official access to the path was removed in 2000 on grounds of safety, whilst rock climbers, for whom the gorge contains many excellent and historic climbs, were given access by a via ferrata that leads back onto the remaining 'Caminito'.

The local government agreed to share costs of restoration of the "Caminito".

The gorge runs from the outlet of the "Embalse del Gaitanejo" to "El Chorro". There are two extremely narrow sections at each end of the gorge with a wider bowl in between. In addition to the re-furbished walkway, the old Málaga-Cordoba railway line runs through the gorge in a set of tunnels and bridges.

The gorge features prominently as a place of escape and refuge for the main characters played by Stephen Boyd and Brigitte Bardot in the 1958 movie The Night Heaven Fell. The railway and sections of the Caminito were used in the final location shots of the 1965 adventure film Von Ryan's Express.
