= Northeastern United States (disambiguation) =

The Northeastern United States is one of the four census regions of the United States.

Northeastern United States, Northeast United States or Northeast region within the United States may also refer to:

- Northeast megalopolis, the heavily urbanized area of the U.S. stretching from Boston to Washington
- Northeast Region, an administrative division of the U.S. National Park Service
- Northeast Region (Boy Scouts of America)

== See also ==
- Atlantic Northeast
- Northeast blackout of 2003
- Northeast Climate Science Center
- Northeast Corridor, a fully electrified railway line that serves the Northeast megalopolis of the United States
- Northeast Conference
- Northeast Operating Rules Advisory Committee
- Northeast Regional, an Amtrak rail route
- Northeast Regional Board of Dental Examiners
- Northeast Regional Ocean Council, an organization created to facilitate coastal conservation
- Northeast (disambiguation)
- North Eastern Athletic Conference
