= Nelson Rocks =

Rock formation in West Virginia, United States

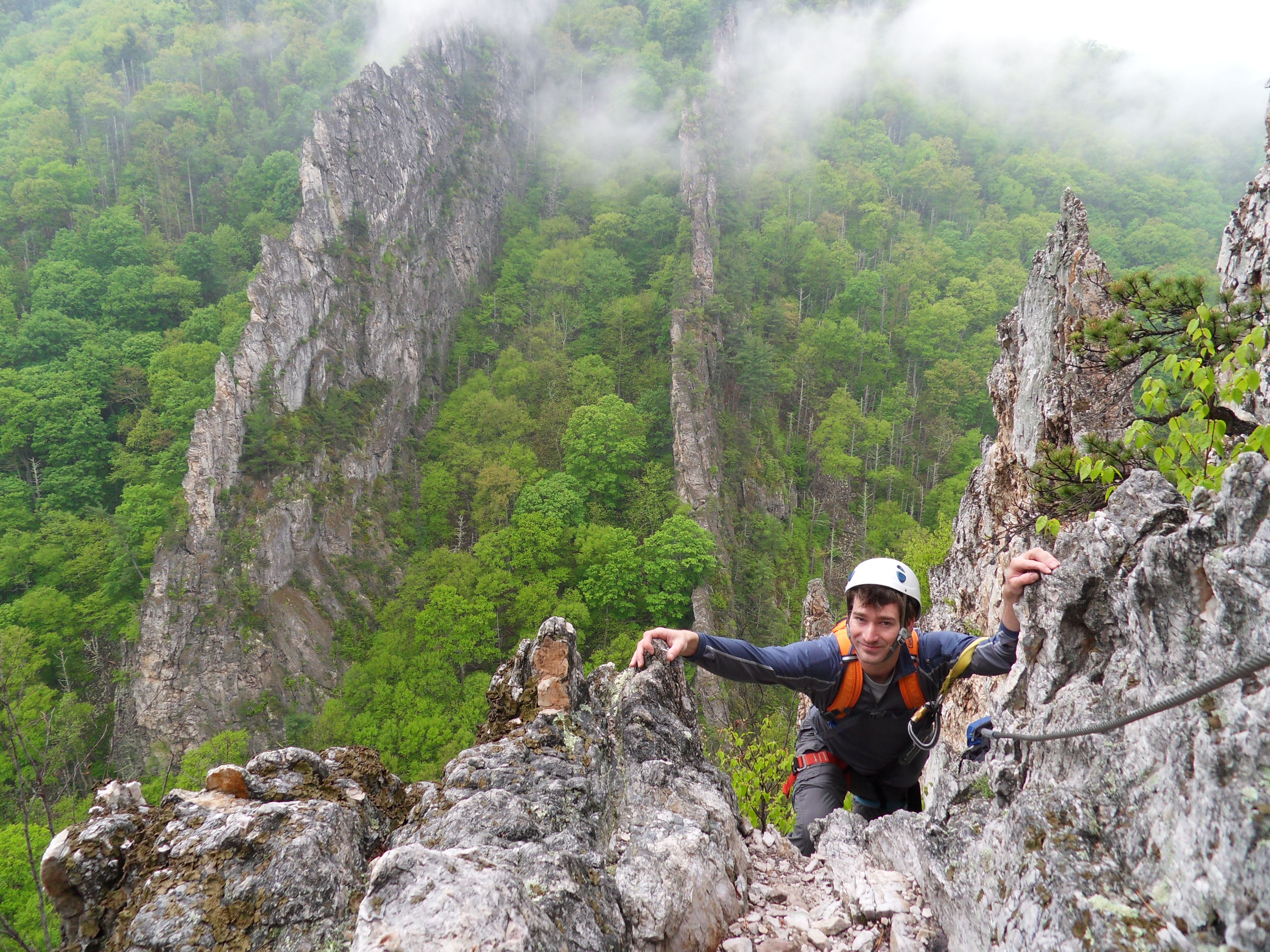

- Location within West Virginia
- Location: Pendleton County, West Virginia
- Nearest city: Circleville, West Virginia
- Range: Allegheny Mountains
- Coordinates: 38°41′46.92″N 79°27′52.41″W
- Type of climbing: Traditional and Sport Climbing crag
- Height range: 800 feet above stream level
- Pitches range: Single and Multi-pitch (The Millennium Route is 9 pitches)
- Technical grades: 5.2-5.12+
- NCCS grades: 1-2
- Rock type: Tuscarora quartzite
- Quantity of routes: Over 200 routes
- Climbing area developed: Mostly developed
- Cliff aspect: East and West facing
- Season: Spring through Fall
- Elevation: 3120
- Ownership: Private
- Access: Closed to unguided climbing Guided climbing by reservation only.
- Camping: Camping by reservation
- Classic climbs: Crescendo (5.10a); Easy Wider (5.6); Stone Gallows (5.10); Millennium (5.7); Merlin (5.11a); The Laeger Route (5.8); Excalibur (5.12a); Sorry Howard (5.9); Written in Stone (5.11+); Porcelain Pumphouse (5.11c)
- Website: www.nrocks.com

Nelson Rocks is a large privately owned rock formation located in the North Fork Valley of Pendleton County, West Virginia, United States. The area is operated under the name of NROCKS Outdoor Adventures, and was previously known as Nelson Rocks Outdoor Center (NROC).

== Description ==
Nelson Rocks is at the southern end of the River Knobs, which contain several other similar "razorback" ridges or "fins" including Seneca Rocks, Champe Rocks, and Judy Rocks, all on the western flank of North Fork Mountain. Nelson Rocks, like all of the river knobs, is bordered by the North Fork Valley on one side and the Germany Valley on the other. Located less than five miles from the highest point in West Virginia, and surrounded on three sides by the Monongahela National Forest, the mountainous site features two parallel rock fins made of tuscarora sandstone that rise from the mountain overlooking Nelson Gap. A hanging footbridge 150 feet in length and 200 feet in height spans the corridor between the rock fins. (Note: Multiple sources, including the website for NROCKS itself, instead give the length and height of the footbridge as 200 feet and 150 feet, respectively.) Visitors can participate in various adventure activities including rock climbing, Via Ferrata climbing, hiking and a canopy tour consisting of 12 zip-lines and other elements. Lodging at Nelson Rocks is available in the form of hotel-style guest rooms, rustic cabins, or tent camping.

== History ==
Rock climbing at Nelson Rocks dates back about as far as at nearby Seneca Rocks; however, for most of that time, this privately owned area was not officially open to the public. In 1943 and 1944, as part of the West Virginia Maneuver Area, the 10th Mountain Division of the United States Army used Seneca, Nelson and Champe Rocks to train mountain troops in assault climbing in preparation for action in the Apennines of Italy. One guidebook author estimates that they left behind approximately 75,000 soft iron pitons, some of which can still be found on the rocks.

In 1998 the area was purchased by Stuart Hammett who operated it under the name Nelson Rocks Preserve for about a decade. The area was officially open to rock climbing, and route development flourished. During the 1998-2001 seasons, the number of routes doubled reaching about 100 routes. Nelson Rocks was included in Rock Climbing: Virginia, West Virginia, and Maryland, a regional guidebook by Eric J. Horst. and in Rock 'n' Road: An Atlas of North American Rock Climbing Areas by Tim Toula. In the next decade the number of routes reached about 200. Also at the same time via ferrata was built., which included a 200 feet long suspension bridge 150 feet above the ground.

In 2009 Nelson Rocks was purchased by John Hall, owner of Camp Horizons company and reopened as the Nelson Rocks Outdoor Center. and expended by adding new buildings and zip-lines. In 2011, construction was completed on the North Fork Valley Canopy Tour. At the same time the area was closed to all unguided climbing. Guided climbing can be reserved through the property owner.

== Guidebooks ==
- Hörst, Eric J. (2001). Rock climbing Virginia, West Virginia, and Maryland (1st ed.). Guilford, Conn.: FalconGuides. ISBN 1560448121.

== Gallery ==
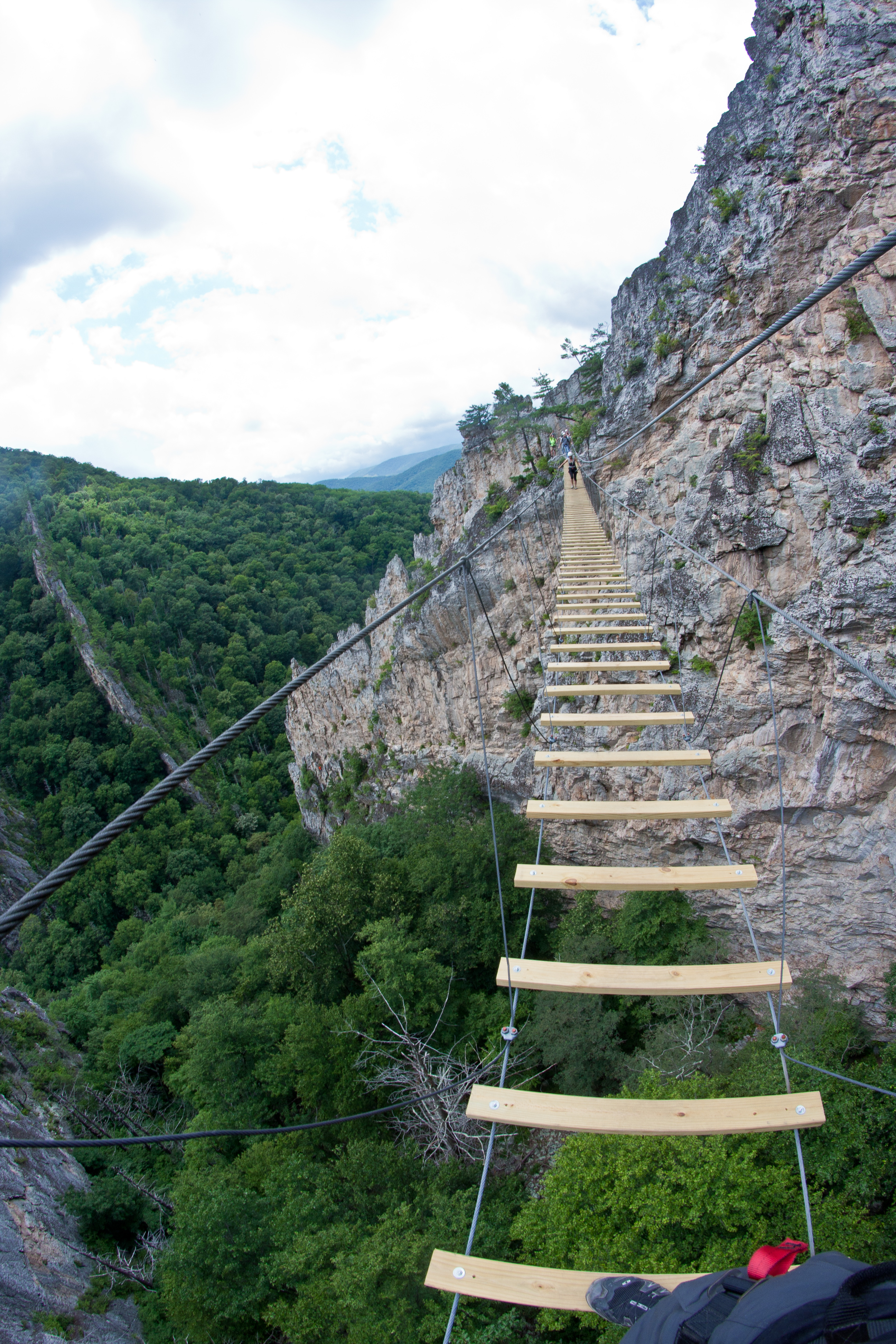
Via Ferrata at Nelson

== Similar Treks ==
- Caminito del Rey
- Tofana di Rozes
- The Gobbins
- Mount Ogden Via Ferrata
- VF Ivano Dibona
- Karlsruher Grat
- Bove Path
