= List of Missouri conservation areas – Northeast region =

Map of Missouri conservation areas with the Northeast region highlighted

The Northeast administrative region of the Missouri Department of Conservation encompasses Adair, Clark, Knox, Lewis, Macon, Marion, Monroe, Pike, Putnam, Ralls, Randolph, Schuyler, Scotland, Shelby, and Sullivan counties. The regional conservation office is in Kirksville.

Conservation Area	Description	Size		County	Location
Anderson (Edward) Conservation Area	This is a forested area in the Mississippi River Hills that offers some of the more rugged terrain in Northeast Missouri. The area is located on the Little Dixie National Scenic By-way, Highway 79 and offers excellent fall color in October.	1,067 acres	432 ha	Ralls, Pike	39°36′5.88″N 91°12′59.81″W
Archangel Access	This area offers a disabled-accessible parking lot and a concrete boat ramp that provides access to the Chariton River.	5 acres	2.0 ha	Schuyler	40°29′8.79″N 92°41′6.67″W
Arrow-Wood Conservation Area	This area provides access to the North Fork of the Salt River.	150 acres	61 ha	Shelby	39°44′37.17″N 92°2′25.74″W
Ashley Access	This area offers access to the North Fork of the Cuivre River.	8 acres	3.2 ha	Pike	39°14′2.30″N 91°14′42.70″W
Atlanta Conservation Area	This area contains forest, old fields, cropland and grassland. Facilities/features: a firearms range and fishable ponds.	2,379 acres	963 ha	Macon	39°52′23.56″N 92°30′38.60″W
Bee Hollow Conservation Area	This area contains forest, cropland, and old fields. Facilities/features: fishable ponds and walk-in access to the East Fork of the Little Chariton River.	255 acres	103 ha	Randolph, Macon	39°36′53.55″N 92°30′56.45″W
Bennitt (Rudolf) Conservation Area	This area is largely forest. Facilities/features: primitive camping, firearms range, 48-acre (190,000 m^{2}) lake, and 2 intermittent streams (Little Perche Creek, Perche Creek).	3,562 acres	1,441 ha	Randolph, Howard, Boone	39°15′41.76″N 92°26′59.82″W
Big Creek Conservation Area	This area borders Thousand Hills State Park and provides the trailhead for the hiking/biking trail on the park.	1,054 acres	427 ha	Adair	40°10′19.00″N 92°37′15.48″W
Black Hawk Access	Contains forest, old fields, cropland, and grassland and offers access to the South Fabius River.	135 acres	55 ha	Marion	39°51′6.96″N 91°40′32.42″W
Bollow (Fred) Conservation Area	This is a forest area.	42 acres	17 ha	Shelby	39°47′59.58″N 92°2′52.70″W
Callahan Mound Access	This forest and old fields area offers access to the North River.	128 acres	52 ha	Marion	39°49′38.56″N 91°47′8.63″W
Calumet Creek Access	This area offers access to Calumet Creek and the Mississippi River, which is immediately downstream. There is a gravel boat ramp.	1.7 acres	0.69 ha	Pike	39°23′57.57″N 90°58′0.88″W
Cedar Bluff Access	This forest area offers access to the Elk Fork of the Salt River.	41 acres	17 ha	Monroe	39°26′11.54″N 92°3′8.26″W
Clark Conservation Area	This area is made up of several tracts of land, of which several are land-locked. Those accessible to the public include: Nixon Branch Tract and Bear Creek Tract. This area is largely forest. Facilities/features: primitive camping and Watershed Lake (35 acres).	740 acres	300 ha	Clark	40°27′4.73″N 91°50′15.76″W
Cook (Elmer A) Memorial Access	This area offers access to the Chariton River. There is a public access but no boat ramp.	5 acres	2.0 ha	Adair	40°7′27.63″N 92°41′34.77″W
Crawford (William E) Conservation Area	This area has 70 acres of oak-hickory woods with some hard maple mixed in along the Des Moines River.	88 acres	36 ha	Clark	40.4969°N 91.6107°W
Dark Hollow Natural Area	This area is made up of mesic upland forest, dry-mesic upland forest, and woodland and savanna.	315 acres	127 ha	Sullivan	40°19′32.46″N 92°56′11.88″W
Deer Ridge Conservation Area	Mostly forest with old fields, cropland and wetlands, including a boat ramp, picnic areas, pavilions, the James B. Jenkins Shooting range, Deer Ridge Community Lake (48 acres) and two permanent streams (North Fabius River, Middle Fabius River).	7,057 acres	2,856 ha	Lewis	40°10′16.91″N 91°49′12.34″W
Dodd Access	Access via boat ramp to the Chariton River.	41 acres	17 ha	Macon	39°50′2.28″N 92°40′48.25″W
Dunn Ford Access	This forest and old fields area offers access to the South Fabius River.	141 acres	57 ha	Marion	39°53′20.70″N 91°45′38.51″W
Dupont Reservation Conservation Area	A predominantly forested area offering spectacular views of the Mississippi River floodplain off of the Little Dixie National Scenic Byway (Highway 79). There is an 80-acre (320,000 m^{2}) mixed upland hardwood forest Natural Area. The area borders the Mississippi River.	1,269 acres	514 ha	Pike	39°33′32.26″N 91°10′40.12″W
Elmslie Memorial Conservation Area	This is a predominantly forest area. Facilities/features: permanent stream (South Fork of the North River), Elmslie Forest Natural Area (northern hardwoods, bottomland hardwoods, upland white oak, cove hardwoods and bluffs).	237 acres	96 ha	Marion	39°44′48.63″N 91°44′32.11″W
Ewing (Ella) Lake Conservation Area	This forest area has a shallow, 12-acre (49,000 m^{2}) lake with a boat ramp.	61 acres	25 ha	Scotland	40°20′24.10″N 92°0′25.33″W
Fabius Chute Access	This area has access to the Mississippi River and a boat ramp.	36 acres	15 ha	Marion	39°51′27.75″N 91°27′0.81″W
Fort Pike Access	This area provides access to the Des Moines River. There is a boat ramp.	2 acres	0.81 ha	Clark	40°27′36.51″N 91°33′59.94″W
Fox Valley Lake Conservation Area	Area contains nearly 1,300 acres (5.3 km^{2}) of forest as well as old fields, cropland, grassland, and wetlands. Facilities/features: boat ramp, fishing dock, primitive camping, picnic areas, firearms/archery ranges, Fox Valley Lake (108 acres), and a permanent stream (Fox River).	2,143 acres	867 ha	Clark	40°28′53.04″N 91°47′28.46″W
Frost Island Conservation Area	This area is largely old fields with forest, cropland, wetlands and prairie. Facilities/features: primitive camping and a permanent stream (Des Moines River).	1,239 acres	501 ha	Clark	40°26′48.02″N 91°32′16.09″W
Griffiths Memorial Conservation Area	This is a grassland and forest area with 1 small fishable pond.	135 acres	55 ha	Macon	39°48′55.16″N 92°44′43.44″W
Hamburg Ferry Access	This area offers access to the Mississippi River. There is a boat ramp.	25 acres	10 ha	Pike	39°13′39.44″N 90°43′31.59″W
Heath (Charlie) Memorial Conservation Area	Mostly forest with cropland, wetlands, old fields, and grassland. Facilities/features: primitive camping, 5 miles (8.0 km) of multi-use trail, 4 fishless ponds, an intermittent stream, (Burnt Shirt Branch) and a permanent stream (Fox River).	1,650 acres	670 ha	Clark	40°34′39.51″N 91°52′49.03″W
Hidden Hollow Conservation Area	Mostly forest with a half-acre fishless pond. Mobility impaired hunter access is also available for those with special hunting needs. This area can be reserved by special use permit through the area manager.	1,331 acres	539 ha	Macon	39°59′43.14″N 92°39′1.67″W
Hunnewell Access	It provides access to the river approximately 5 miles (8.0 km) above where it flows into Mark Twain Lake. There is a boat ramp.	38 acres	15 ha	Shelby	39°39′59.19″N 91°54′1.71″W
Hunnewell Lake Conservation Area	This is a lake, cropland, forest and old fields area. Facilities/features: fishing boats at no cost, fishing dock, primitive camping, fish hatchery, picnic areas, fishing jetty and Hunnewell Lake (228 acres).	1,875 acres	759 ha	Shelby	39°42′26.33″N 91°52′17.80″W
Indian Camp Access	This forested area offers boat ramp access to the Salt River.	10 acres	4.0 ha	Ralls	39°36′52.96″N 91°23′28.77″W
Indian Hills Conservation Area	Contains old fields, cropland, forest, grassland and some wetlands. Facilities/features: primitive camping, 2 permanent streams (South Fork Middle Fabius River and the North Fork of the Middle Fabius River) and a heron rookery. Mobility impaired hunter access is available.	3,984 acres	1,612 ha	Scotland	40°19′53.53″N 92°15′39.88″W
LaBelle Lake Conservation Area	This area includes a boat ramp, picnic area, and pavilion along with the lake (112 acres).	329 acres	133 ha	Lewis	40°5′55.18″N 91°54′6.67″W
Locust Creek Conservation Area	This area contains forest, grassland, old fields, cropland, and wetlands along with the Locust Creek Experimental Stream Management Area.	3,467 acres	1,403 ha	Sullivan	40°10′33.45″N 93°10′41.97″W
Long Branch Lake Management Lands	Facilities/features: boat ramps, campgrounds/swimming beach (at Long Branch State Park), and Long Branch Lake.	2,504 acres	1,013 ha	Macon	39°51′46.68″N 92°31′0.43″W
McPike Access	This forest and old fields area offers access to Troublesome Creek.	76 acres	31 ha	Marion	39°54′32.48″N 91°40′47.96″W
Mineral Hills Conservation Area	Mostly forest with old fields and cropland. Facilities/features: fishable ponds (3 acres total), a beaver pond and other wildlife waterholes and a permanent stream (South Blackbird Creek). Limited mobility sites are available for hunting and/or viewing opportunities.	1,988 acres	805 ha	Putnam	40°25′14.15″N 92°57′39.90″W
Montgomery Woods Conservation Area	Primarily forest. Facilities/features: intermittent stream (Little Mussel Fork).	349 acres	141 ha	Adair, Macon	40°2′40.83″N 92°50′15.93″W
Morris Prairie Conservation Area	One of the highest quality prairie remnants in northern Missouri.	165 acres	67 ha	Putnam, Sullivan	40°23′5.60″N 92°56′24.05″W
Mound View Access	Provides walking access to the North Fork of the Salt River.	45 acres	18 ha	Shelby	39°42′29.52″N 91°57′42.65″W
Mullanix Ford Access	This area offers access to the Chariton River. There is a boat ramp.	14 acres	5.7 ha	Putnam, Adair	40°20′34.83″N 92°41′8.10″W
Mussel Fork Conservation Area	This area contains cropland, old fields, grassland, and woodlands. Area includes 3 fishable ponds and a permanent stream (Mussel Fork Creek).	2,449 acres	991 ha	Linn, Macon	39°43′28.15″N 92°51′43.97″W
Neeper Conservation Area	Predominantly forest. Facilities/features: primitive camping and 2 fishable ponds (1 acre total).	232 acres	94 ha	Clark	40°19′35.15″N 91°45′11.17″W
Paris Access	This grassland and forest area offers access to the Middle Fork of the Salt River.	6 acres	2.4 ha	Monroe	39°29′16.83″N 92°0′4.66″W
Pin Oak Conservation Area	Comprised completely of bottomland forest.	51 acres	21 ha	Shelby	39°46′36.82″N 92°8′58.21″W
Prairie Slough Conservation Area	This forest and wetlands tract contains Prairie Sough Natural Area, a wet-mesic bottomland forest.	610 acres	250 ha	Lincoln, Pike	39°12′45.72″N 90°44′29.89″W
Ranacker Conservation Area	Mostly forest with a mix of cropland, grassland, and old fields. Peno Creek runs through the area and is one of the higher quality streams in North Missouri. The shooting range has 25, 50, and 100 yard targets.	1,831 acres	741 ha	Pike	39°27′5.51″N 91°17′36.88″W
Ray (J Thad) Memorial WA	Mostly forested with an archery range.	167 acres	68 ha	Marion	39°44′7.36″N 91°24′40.14″W
Rebel's Cove Conservation Area	Contains forest, grassland, old fields, cropland and wetlands. Facilities/features: boat ramps, a pavilion, fishable ponds, an intermittent stream (Coon Creek) and a permanent stream (Chariton River).	4,170 acres	1,690 ha	Putnam, Schuyler	40°33′27.66″N 92°42′7.00″W
Redman Conservation Area	Grassland area with a small pheasant population.	121 acres	49 ha	Macon	39°51′17.34″N 92°20′42.14″W
Rocky Ford Access	Provides fishing access to Locust Creek. No boat ramp.	7 acres	2.8 ha	Sullivan	40°3′51.05″N 93°10′2.74″W
Rose Pond Conservation Area	Primarily wetlands and old fields and a permanent stream (Honey Creek).	382 acres	155 ha	Clark	40°20′9.62″N 91°30′30.66″W
Santa Fe Access	This old fields and forest area offers access to the South Fork of the Salt River. There is a boat ramp.	7 acres	2.8 ha	Monroe	39°22′25.23″N 91°48′23.76″W
Sears Lake	Tract is mostly forest. Facilities/features: boat ramp, primitive camping, and Sears Community Lake (19 acres).	87 acres	35 ha	Sullivan	40°15′34.20″N 93°4′26.96″W
Sever (Henry) Lake Conservation Area	This area contains old fields, forest, cropland, and prairie. Facilities/features: boat ramp, boat rental, boat dock, primitive camping, picnic areas, and Sever Lake (158 acres).	1,092 acres	442 ha	Knox	40°0′51.61″N 91°59′7.10″W
Shanks (Ted) Conservation Area	This area contains about 4,000 acres (16 km^{2}) of flooded wetlands. Facilities/features: lake boat ramp, stream boat ramp, waterfowl blinds, and 2 natural areas (Burr-Reed Slough and Oval Lake). There are also more than 500 acres (2.0 km^{2}) of fishable water, including Horseshoe Lake and Rainbow Lake.	6,848 acres	2,771 ha	Pike	39°30′51.83″N 91°6′51.65″W
Shoemaker Conservation Area	Mainly forested. Facilities/features: primitive camping and a permanent stream (Spring Creek).	198 acres	80 ha	Adair	40°17′24.64″N 92°47′59.91″W
Soulard Access	This forest area offers access to the Fabius River and the Mississippi River, which is just downstream. There are several fishing jetties.	257 acres	104 ha	Marion	39°53′31.82″N 91°28′37.50″W
Steyermark (Julian) Woods Conservation Area	This is a forested area.	74 acres	30 ha	Marion	39°44′24.92″N 91°23′21.69″W
Sugar Creek Conservation Area	The area is mainly forest with old fields and cropland. Facilities/features: hiking trail, designated multi-use trail (permit required for groups of 10 or more riders), and intermittent streams (Sugar Creek, Elm Creek).	2,590 acres	1,050 ha	Adair	40°6′21.16″N 92°38′1.14″W
Sunnyside School Access	Provides walk-in access to the Wyaconda River.	119 acres	48 ha	Lewis	40°5′17.20″N 91°32′28.60″W
Thomas Hill Reservoir Conservation Area	Primarily forest and old fields. Facilities/features: campground, boat ramps, boat docks, picnic areas, a fishing jetty, and 4,950 acres (20.0 km^{2}) of fishable water. The area also has a waterfowl refuge north of Route T and upland hunting on several thousand acres.	9,227 acres	3,734 ha	Randolph, Macon	39°37′7.29″N 92°37′45.03″W
Thompson (Robert H) Conservation Area	This is a forest and open-field area on the Mississippi River.	13 acres	5.3 ha	Ralls	39°37′45.08″N 91°14′41.89″W
Tolona Access	Offers bank access to the Middle Fabius River. The boat ramp is unusable.	172 acres	70 ha	Lewis	40°3′16.41″N 91°43′46.27″W
Truitt (Henry) Access	This area offers bank access to the Chariton River, but there is no boat ramp.	3 acres	1.2 ha	Adair	40°14′7.40″N 92°41′8.51″W
Union Ridge Conservation Area	About 3/4 of the area is forest, and the rest is savanna, old fields, wetlands and cropland. Facilities/features: boat ramp, primitive camping, fishable lake (11 acres), 3 permanent streams (Spring Creek, Dry Branch Creek, Jobs Creek), and an intermittent stream (Lake Branch Creek).	8,071 acres	3,266 ha	Sullivan	40°18′20.09″N 92°51′27.08″W
Upper Mississippi Conservation Area	These tracts are mostly forest along with old fields and wetlands. The area contains waterfowl blinds and Westport Island Natural Area, which is a bottomland wet-mesic forest.	13,079 acres	5,293 ha	Lincoln, Lewis, St. Charles, Pike	39°13′33.46″N 90°46′2.10″W
White (Robert M II) Conservation Area	The area is largely forest with cropland, old fields, grassland, and prairie. Facilities/features: 2 permanent streams and 2 lakes (18 acres total).	1,163 acres	471 ha	Monroe, Audrain	39°20′4.96″N 91°51′49.30″W
White Oak Bend Access	Provides access to the South Fabius River.	152 acres	62 ha	Knox	39°59′47.53″N 92°1′17.75″W
Willingham (Ruby Clark) Memorial WA	Area is all forest.	70 acres	28 ha	Monroe	39°29′48.56″N 92°5′33.14″W
Woodlawn Access	This forest, grassland and old-fields area offers access to the middle fork of the Salt River.	61 acres	25 ha	Monroe	39°32′27.27″N 92°12′39.12″W
Wyaconda Crossing Conservation Area	The Wyaconda River flows through this forest area, offering access to the river at a low-water crossing.	147 acres	59 ha	Lewis	40°11′25.18″N 91°36′33.07″W

== Notes ==
- Acreage and counties from MDCLand GIS file
- Names, descriptions, and locations from Conservation Atlas Online GIS file
