= Northeast Regional Ocean Council =

Member states of NROC

The Northeast Regional Ocean Council (NROC) is a state-federal partnership created to address regional issues related to the coast and ocean. The organization covers each state in New England which make up its membership. NROC was created in 2005 by the New England Governors Conference. Since 2008, NROC has participated in the National Oceanic and Atmospheric Administration's Coastal and Marine Spatial Planning initiative.
