= Caminito del Rey =

High, narrow walkway in Málaga, Spain

Coordinates: 36°54′57″N 4°46′22″W

El Caminito del Rey
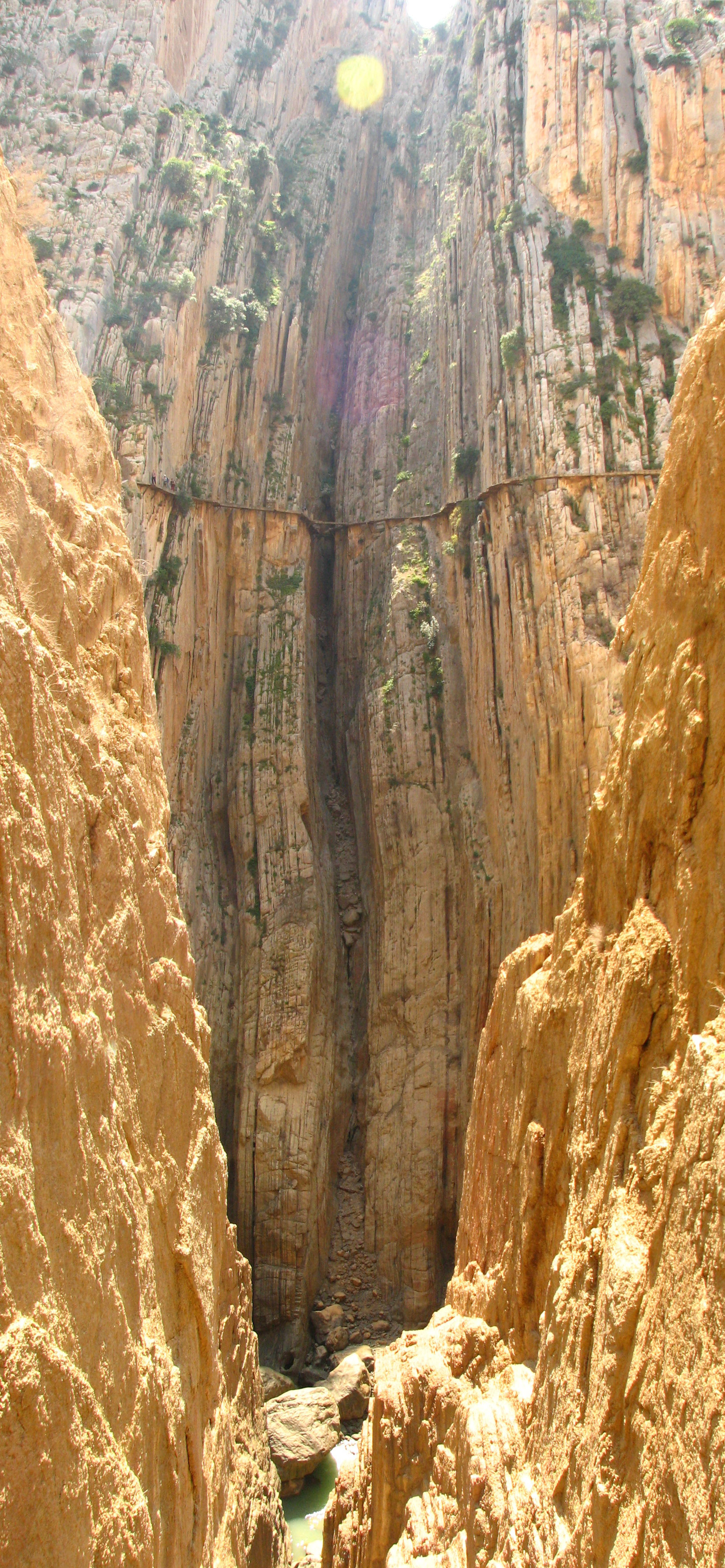
- Ground-level view
- Length: 3 km.
- Location: Ardales, Málaga, Andalusia, Spain
- Established: 1905
- Use: Hiking

Caminito del Rey (The King's Little Path) is a walkway pinned along the steep walls of a narrow gorge in El Chorro, near Ardales in the province of Málaga, Spain. Its name derives from the original name of Camino del Rey (King's Pathway), abbreviated locally to el caminito. The walkway was constructed in the early 20th century, but by the early 21st century, it had fallen into disrepair and was partially closed for over a decade. After four years of extensive repairs and renovations, it re-opened in 2015. It has been described as the "world's most dangerous walkway" following five deaths in 1999 and 2000. The most dramatic accident was when three men from El Chorro tried to cross by means of a zip line to a train line at the other side of the gorge. The cable could not stand the weight of the three men, and it broke.

== History ==
The walkway was built to provide workers at the hydroelectric power plants at Chorro Falls and Gaitanejo Falls with a means to cross between them, to provide for transport of materials, and to help facilitate inspection and maintenance of the channel. The construction began in 1901 and was finished in 1905. King Alfonso XIII crossed the walkway in 1921 for the inauguration of the dam Conde del Guadalhorce, and it became known by its present name. The walkway is 1 metre (3 ft) in width and rises over 100 metres (330 ft) above the river below.

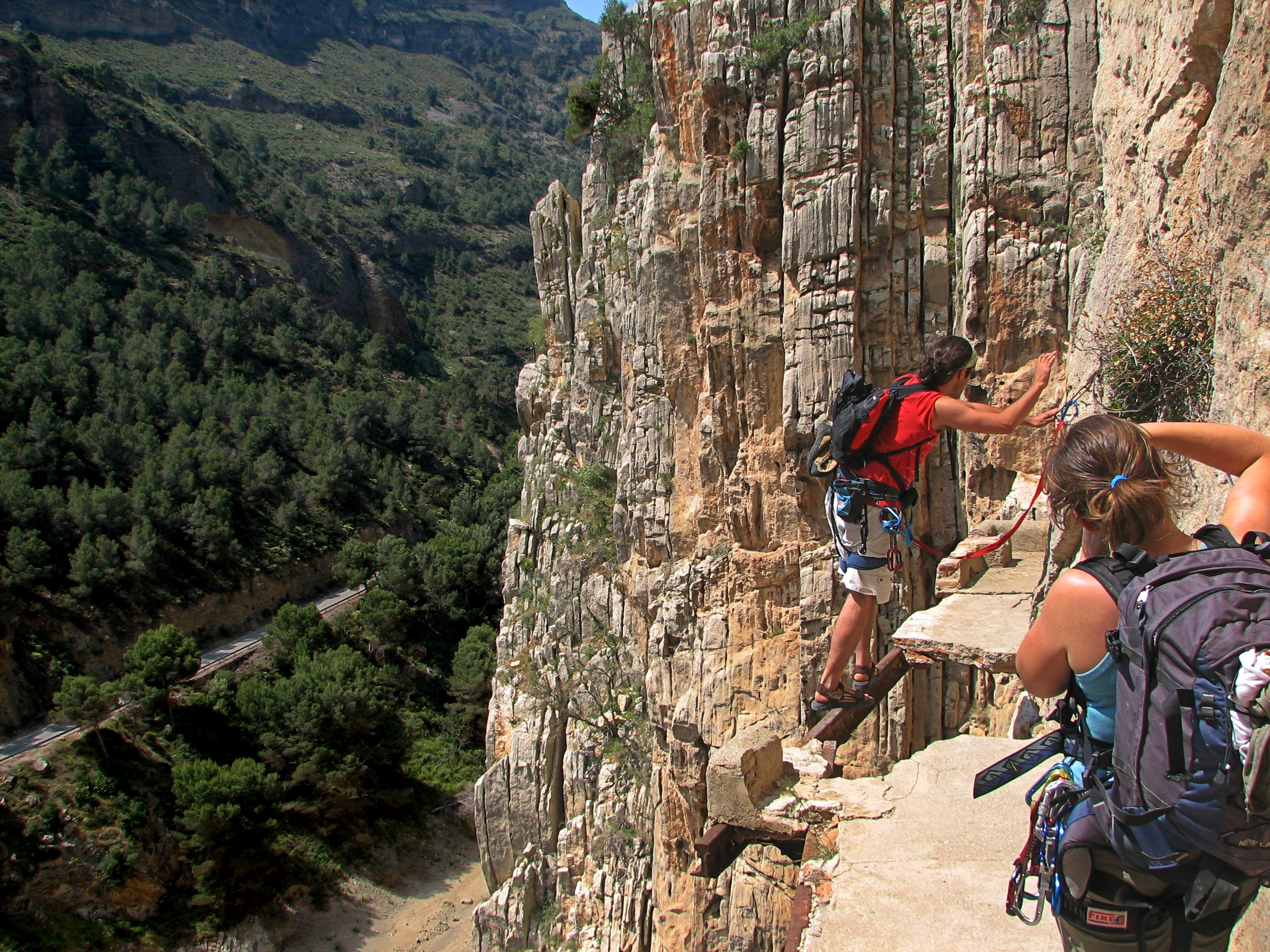
Traversing a collapsed section in 2006

The original path was constructed of concrete and rested on steel rails supported by stanchions built at approximately 45 degrees into the rock face. It deteriorated over the years, and there were numerous sections where part or all of the concrete top had collapsed. The result was large open-air gaps bridged only by narrow steel beams or other supports. Few of the original handrails remained, although a safety wire ran the length of the path. Several people died on the walkway and, after two fatal accidents in 1999 and 2000, the local government closed both entrances. Even so, in the four years leading up to 2013, four people died attempting to climb the gorge.

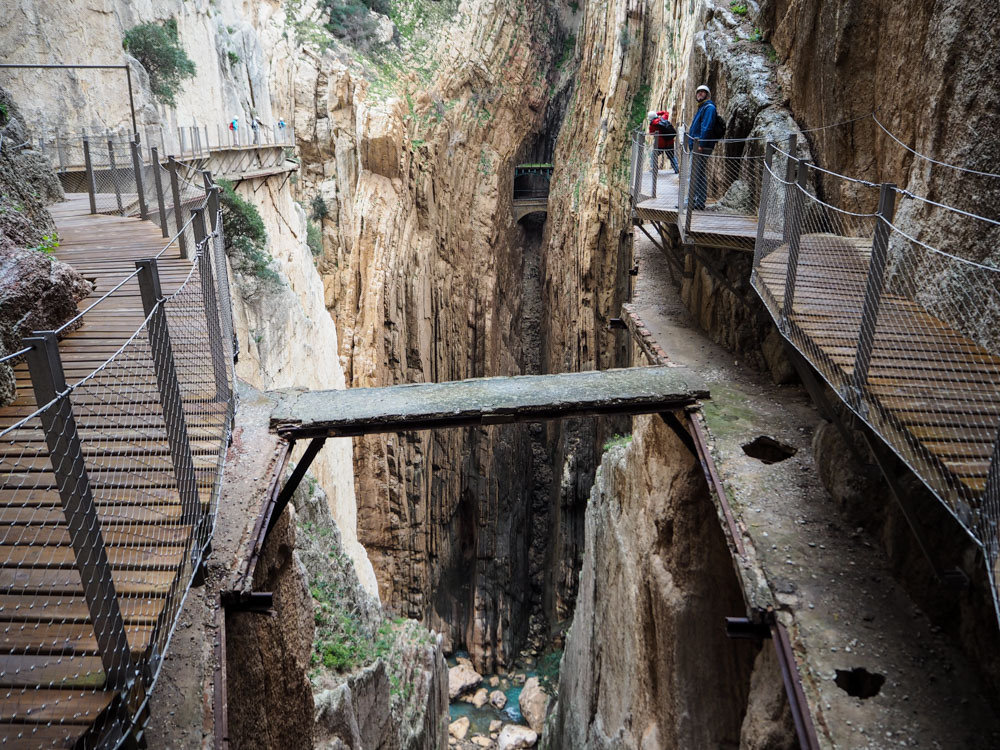
Current state of El Caminito del Rey, with the original pathway below and new pathway above

The regional government of Andalusia and the local government of Málaga agreed in June 2011 to share costs of restoration (including car parking and a museum) of €9 million. The project took approximately three years to complete. Many of the original features remained in place.

In March 2014, the cornerstone of the rehabilitation project was laid by specialized alpinists. The walkway reopened on 29 March 2015, and Lonely Planet listed it in the best new attractions for 2015. The new pathway offers a walk of 2.9 km along the side of the gorge.

== Landscape ==
The landscape of Caminito del Rey was initially formed during the Mesozoic Era around 250 million years ago. During this period the whole area of Desfiladero de los Gaitanes was covered in water and through many years of accumulation of marine sediment from coral and other ancient marine species. This resulted in the now seen limestone and dolomite rocks in the Gorges.

Furthermore, these Gorges seen in the area were formed by years of physical and chemical weathering. Processes like Karst weathering of limestone rock forms created the now seen mesmerizing network of caves, grottos, and jagged rock formations that dot the landscape.

Water erosion of the Guadalhorce River carved the Gorge. Massive potholes in the Gorges also formed due to water swirling around big rocks and slowly carving out holes in the landscape.

== In film ==
In the film Scent of Mystery released in 1960, also known as Holiday in Spain, there is a chase scene towards the end of the film that takes place on the Caminito del Rey where the hero (Denholm Elliott) and his cohort (Peter Lorre) are chased by the antagonist (Paul Lucas). At the end of the chase Paul Lucas is run down by a train in a tunnel that is also part of the Park complex.

Some of the final scenes of the 1965 film Von Ryan's Express were shot at the confluence of the gateway and the railway.
