= Dolomites =

Mountain range in the Italian Alps

- Italian: Dolomiti; Ladin: Dolomites; German: Dolomiten
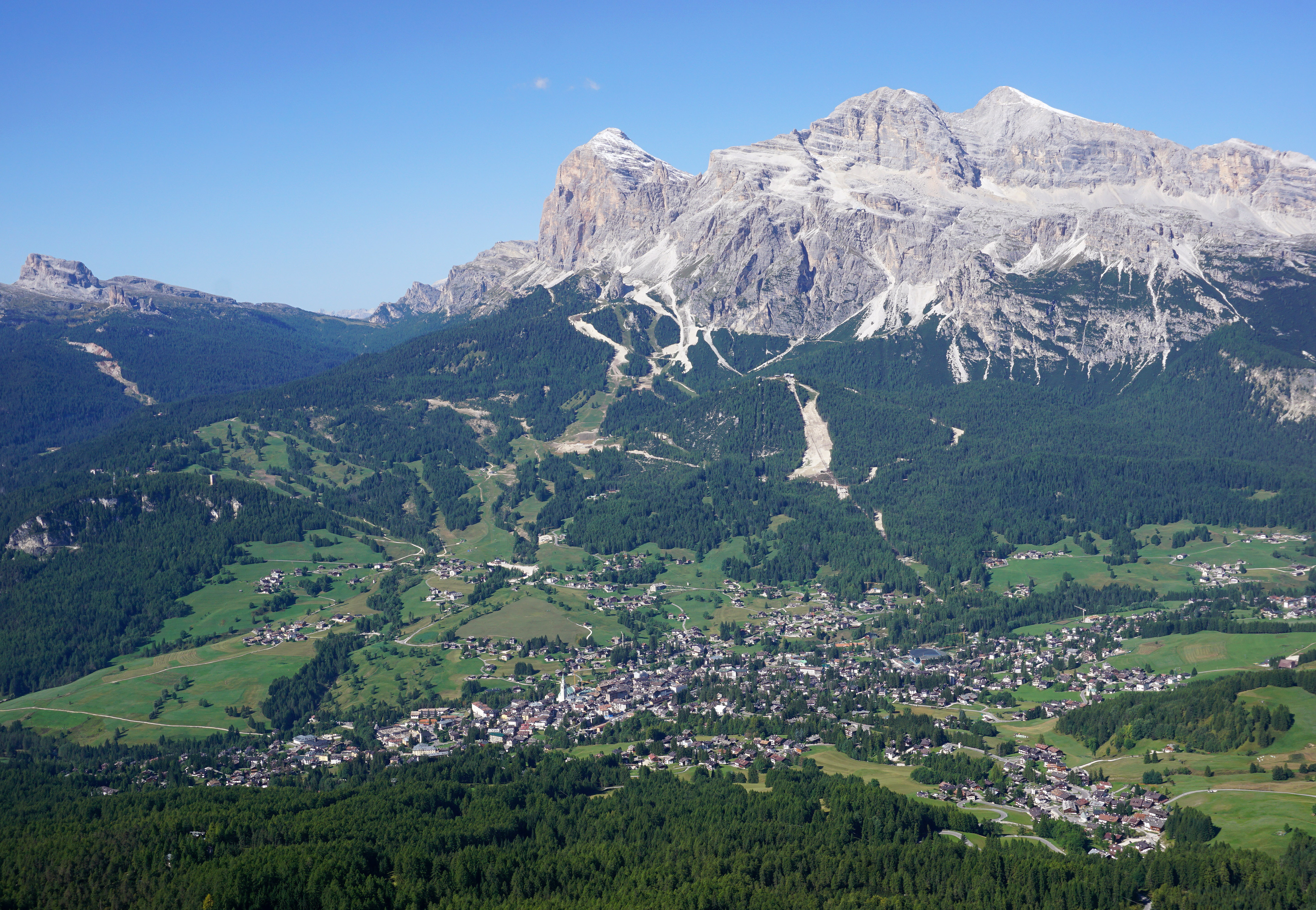
- Tofana massif with Cortina d'Ampezzo in the foreground

Highest point
- Peak: Marmolada
- Elevation: 3,343 m (10,968 ft)
- Coordinates: 46°26′N 11°51′E

Dimensions
- Area: 15,942 km^{2} (6,155 mi^{2})

Geography
- Location within Alps
- Country: Italy
- Regions: Veneto; Trentino-Alto Adige/Südtirol; Friuli-Venezia Giulia
- Parent range: Alps

Geology
- Orogeny: Alpine orogeny
- Rock age: Mostly Triassic
- Rock types: Sedimentary rocks (dolomite); volcanic rocks

The Dolomites
UNESCO World Heritage Site
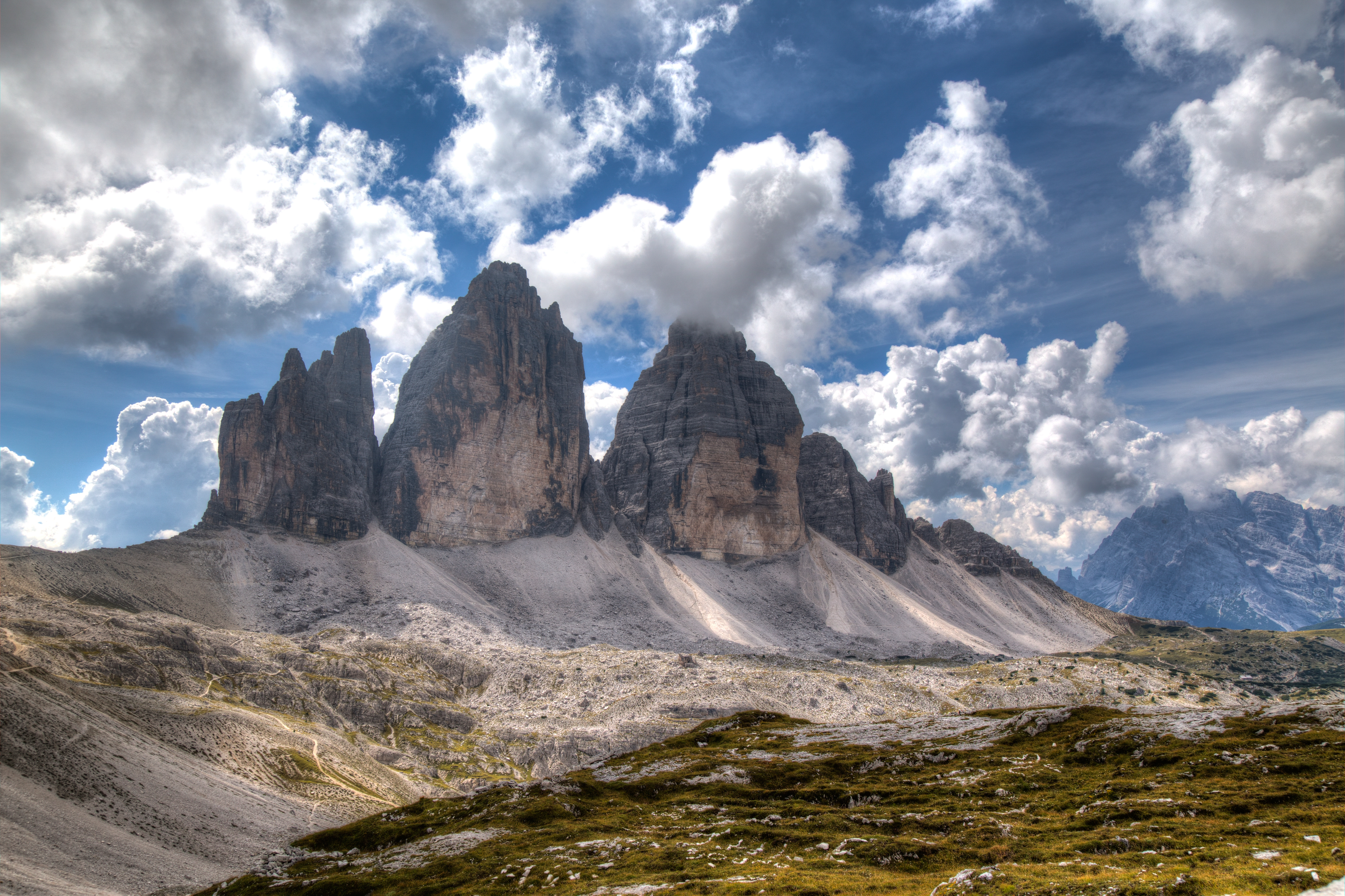
- The Three Peaks of Lavaredo
- Interactive map of The Dolomites
- Criteria: Natural: (vii)(viii)
- Reference: 1237
- Inscription: 2009 (33rd Session)
- Area: 141,902.8 ha (350,649 acres)
- Buffer zone: 89,266.7 ha (220,583 acres)

The Dolomites (Italian: Dolomiti, pronounced [doloˈmiːti]) (Note: also known as the Dolomite Mountains, Dolomite Alps or Dolomitic Alps) or Pale Mountains (Italian: Monti Pallidi) are a mountain range in northeastern Italy. They form part of the Southern Limestone Alps and extend from the river Adige in the west to the Piave Valley (Pieve di Cadore) in the east. The northern and southern borders are defined by the Puster Valley and the Sugana Valley (Italian: Valsugana). The Dolomites are in the regions of Veneto, Trentino-Alto Adige/Südtirol and Friuli-Venezia Giulia, covering an area shared between the provinces of Belluno, Vicenza, Verona, Trentino, South Tyrol, Udine and Pordenone.

Other mountain groups of similar geological structure are spread along the river Piave to the east–Dolomiti d'Oltrepiave; and far away over the Adige River to the west Dolomiti di Brenta (Western Dolomites). A smaller group is called Piccole Dolomiti (Little Dolomites), between the provinces of Trentino, Verona and Vicenza.

The Dolomiti Bellunesi National Park and many other regional parks are in the Dolomites. On 26 June 2009, the Dolomites were declared a UNESCO World Heritage Site. The Adamello-Brenta UNESCO Global Geopark is also in the Dolomites. The Geological Museum of the Dolomites (in Italian Museo Geologico delle Dolomiti) is located in Predazzo, Fiemme Valley.

== Etymology ==
The Dolomites take their name from the carbonate rock dolomite. This was named after the 18th-century French mineralogist Déodat Gratet de Dolomieu (1750–1801), who was the first to describe the mineral. The prior local vernacular name of Monti Pallidi came from the mountains' reddish to purple hues viewed at sunset from said carbonates' reflection of the shine alpenglow.

== History ==
For millennia, hunters and gatherers had advanced into the highest rocky regions and had probably also climbed some peaks. There is evidence that the Jesuit priest Franz von Wulfen from Klagenfurt climbed the Lungkofel and the Dürrenstein in the 1790s. In 1857 Irishman John Ball was the first known person to climb Monte Pelmo. Paul Grohmann later climbed numerous peaks such as the Antelao, Marmolada, Tofana, Monte Cristallo and the Boè. Around 1860 the Agordin mountaineer Simone de Silvestro was the first person to stand on the Civetta. Michael Innerkofler was one of the climbers of the Tre Cime di Lavaredo. Later very important local mountaineers, known for many first ascents, were Angelo Dibona and Giovanni Piaz.

During the First World War, the front line between the Italian and Austro-Hungarian Army ran through the Dolomites, where both sides used mines extensively. Open-air war museums are at Cinque Torri ("Five Towers"), Monte Piana and Mount Lagazuoi. Many people visit the Dolomites to climb the vie ferrate, protected paths through the rock walls that were created during the war. In October 2026 CNN reported of hundreds of WWI munitions found and removed from the Dolomites following melting ice.

A number of long-distance footpaths traverse the Dolomites. They are called alte vie (German: Dolomiten Höhenwege – "high paths"), and are numbered 1 to 10. The trails take about a week to walk, and are served by numerous rifugi ("huts"). Alta Via 1. Radiocarbon dating has been used in the Alta Badia region to demonstrate a connection between landslide activity and climate change.

== Geography ==
The region is commonly divided into the Western and Eastern Dolomites, separated by a line following the Val Badia–Campolongo Pass–Cordevole Valley (Agordino) axis.

=== Current classification ===
The Dolomites may be divided into the following ranges:

- Sella
- Marmolada
- Tofane
- Langkofel
- Brenta Group
- Odles Group
- Peitlerkofel Group
- Puez Group
- Fanes-Sennes-Prags
- Schlern Group
- Rosengarten
- Latemar
- Pala
- Civetta
- Pelmo
- Marmarole
- Cadini Group
- Cristallo Group
- Sorapiss
- Antelao
- Bosconero
- Vette Feltrine
- Schiara
- Sexten Dolomites
- Friulian Dolomites

== Tourism and sports ==
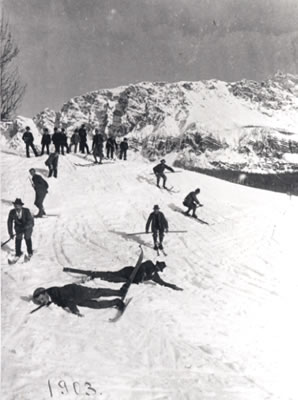
Skiers in Cortina in 1903

The Dolomites are renowned for skiing in the winter months and mountain climbing, hiking, cycling and BASE jumping, as well as paragliding and hang gliding in summer and late spring/early autumn. Free climbing has been a tradition in the Dolomites since 1887, when 17-year-old Georg Winkler soloed the first ascent of the pinnacle of the Vajolet Towers. The main centres include: Rocca Pietore alongside the Marmolada Glacier, which lies on the border of Trentino and Veneto, the small towns of Alleghe, Falcade, Auronzo, Cortina d'Ampezzo and the villages of Arabba, Urtijëi and San Martino di Castrozza, as well as the whole of the Fassa, Gardena and Badia valleys.

The Maratona dles Dolomites, an annual single-day road bicycle race covering seven mountain passes of the Dolomites, occurs in the first week of July.

Other characteristic places are:

- Mount Pasubio and Strada delle 52 Gallerie (a military mule road built during World War I with 52 tunnels)
- Altopiano di Asiago and Calà del Sasso, with 4,444 steps, the world's longest staircase open to the public.

== Major peaks ==
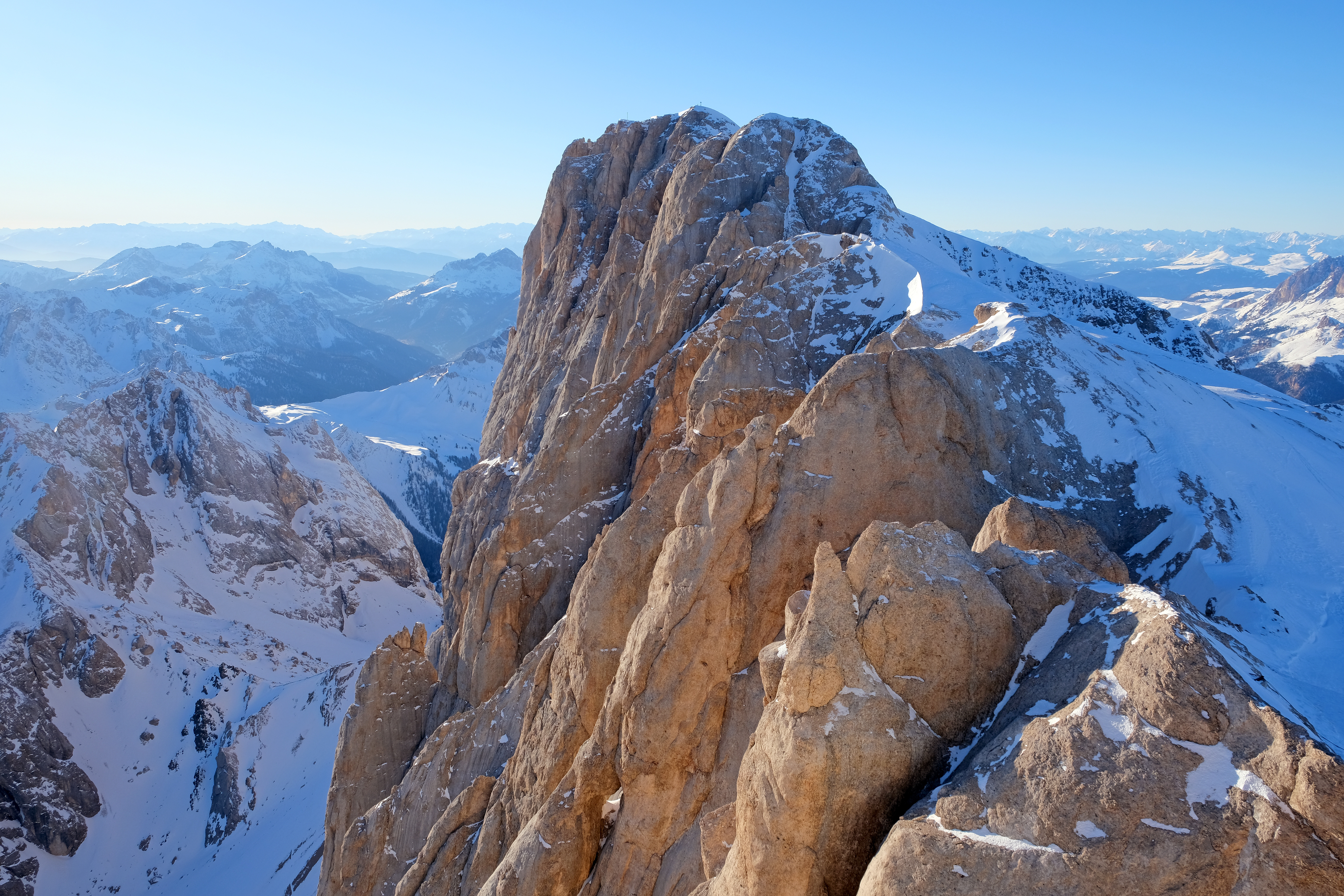
Punta Penia (3 343 m), the highest point of Marmolada mountain.

| Name | Metres | Feet |
|---|---|---|
| Marmolada | 3,343 | 10,968 |
| Antelao | 3,264 | 10,706 |
| Tofana di Mezzo | 3,241 | 10,633 |
| Sorapiss | 3,229 | 10,594 |
| Cristallo | 3,221 | 10,568 |
| Monte Civetta | 3,220 | 10,564 |
| Cima di Vezzana | 3,192 | 10,470 |
| Cimon della Pala | 3,184 | 10,453 |
| Langkofel / Sassolungo | 3,181 | 10,427 |
| Monte Pelmo | 3,168 | 10,397 |
| Dreischusterspitze | 3,162 | 10,375 |
| Boespitze / Piz Boè (Sella group) | 3,152 | 10,342 |
| Hohe Gaisl (Croda Rossa d'Ampezzo) | 3,148 | 10,329 |
| Gran Vernel | 3,145 | 10,319 |
| Piz Popena | 3,143 | 10,312 |
| Cima dei Bureloni | 3,130 | 10,269 |
| Grohmannspitze (Langkofel) | 3,126 | 10,256 |
| Zwölferkofel | 3,094 | 10,151 |
| Elferkofel | 3,092 | 10,144 |
| Piz dles Cunturines | 3,064 | 10,052 |
| Sass Rigais (Geislerspitzen) | 3,025 | 9,925 |
| Kesselkogel (Rosengarten) | 3,004 | 9,856 |
| Tre Cime di Lavaredo (Drei Zinnen) | 2,999 | 9,839 |
| Fünffingerspitze | 2,996 | 9,829 |
| Pala di San Martino | 2,982 | 9,831 |
| Rosengartenspitze / Catinaccio | 2,981 | 9,781 |
| Cima di Fradusta | 2,939 | 9,642 |
| Cimon del Froppa | 2,932 | 9,649 |
| Piz de Puez | 2,918 | 9,573 |
| Cima Canali | 2,900 | 9,514 |
| Grande Fermeda | 2,873 | 9,426 |
| Monte Agnèr | 2,872 | 9,416 |
| Fermedaturm | 2,867 | 9,407 |
| Cima d'Asta | 2,848 | 9,344 |
| Croda Grande | 2,849 | 9,347 |
| Vajoletturm / Torri del Vajolet (highest) | 2,821 | 9,256 |
| Sass Maor | 2,814 | 9,232 |
| Cima di Ball | 2,802 | 9,193 |
| Cima della Madonna (Sass Maor) | 2,751 | 9,026 |
| Cima della Rosetta | 2,743 | 8,999 |
| Cima Ambrizzola | 2,715 | 8,907 |
| Central Grasleitenspitze | 2,705 | 8,875 |
| Sassongher | 2,665 | 8,743 |
| Schlern | 2,562 | 8,406 |
| Sasso di Mur | 2,554 | 8,380 |
| Monte Siera | 2,443 | 8,015 |
| Cima delle Dodici | 2,338 | 7,671 |
| Monte Pavione | 2,336 | 7,664 |
| Cima Palon | 2,239 | 7,346 |
| Cima di Posta | 2,235 | 7,333 |

== Major passes ==
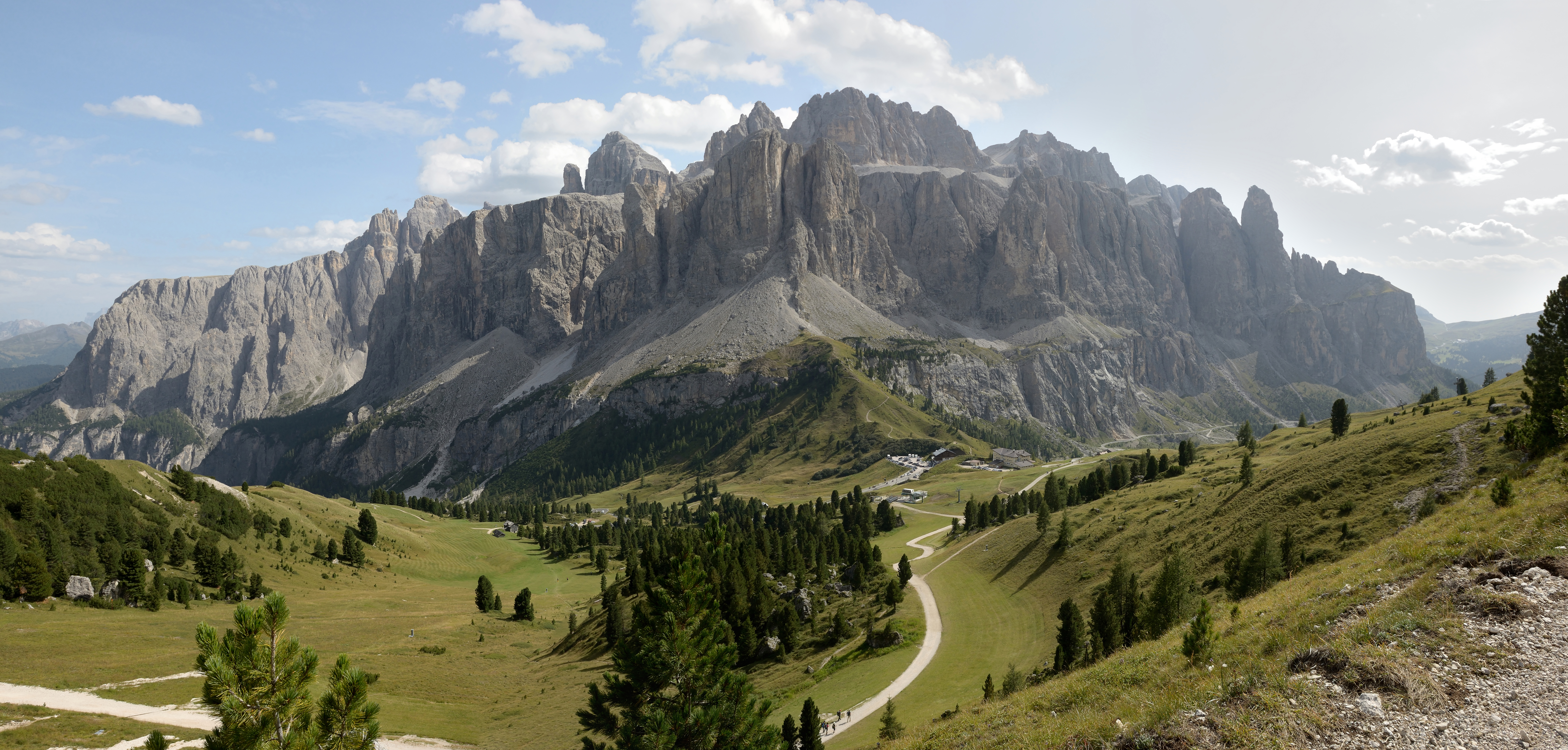
View of Gardena Pass and Sella group from Pizes de Cir

| Name | metres | feet |
|---|---|---|
| Ombretta Pass (Campitello to Caprile), footpath | 2,738 | 8,983 |
| Sassolungo (Val Gardena to Campitello), footpath | 2,683 | 8,803 |
| Tschagerjoch (Karersee to the Vajolet Glen), footpath | 2,644 | 8,675 |
| Grasleiten Pass (Vajolet Glen to the Grasleiten Glen), footpath | 2,597 | 8,521 |
| Pravitale Pass (Rosetta Plateau to the Pravitale Glen), footpath | 2,580 | 8,465 |
| Comelle Pass (same to Cencenighe), footpath | 2,579 | 8,462 |
| Rosetta Pass (San Martino di Castrozza to the great limestone Rosetta plateau), footpath | 2,573 | 8,442 |
| Vajolet Pass (Tiers to the Vajolet Glen), footpath | 2,549 | 8,363 |
| Canali Pass (Primiero to Agordo), footpath | 2,497 | 8,193 |
| Tierseralpljoch (Campitello to Tiers), footpath | 2,455 | 8,055 |
| Ball Pass (San Martino di Castrozza to the Pravitale Glen), footpath | 2,450 | 8,038 |
| Forcella di Giralba (Sexten to Auronzo), footpath | 2,436 | 7,992 |
| Col dei Bos (Falzarego Glen to the Travernanzes Glen), footpath | 2,313 | 7,589 |
| Forcella Grande (San Vito to Auronzo), footpath | 2,262 | 7,422 |
| Pordoi Pass (Arabba to Val di Fassa), road | 2,250 | 7,382 |
| Sella Pass (Val Gardena to Val di Fassa), road | 2,244 | 7,362 |
| Giau Pass (Cortina to Val Fiorentina), road | 2,236 | 7,336 |
| Tre Sassi Pass (Cortina to San Ciascian), footpath | 2,199 | 7,215 |
| Valparola Pass (Cortina to San Ciascian), road | 2,168 | 7,113 |
| Mahlknechtjoch (Upper Duron Glen to the Seiser Alp), footpath | 2,168 | 7,113 |
| Gardena Pass (Val Gardena to Colfosch), road | 2,121 | 6,959 |
| Falzarego Pass (Caprile to Cortina), road | 2,117 | 6,946 |
| Fedaja Pass (Val di Fassa to Caprile), bridle path | 2,046 | 6,713 |
| Valles Pass (Paneveggio to Falcade), road | 2,032 | 6,667 |
| Würzjoch (Eisacktal to Val Badia), road | 2,003 | 6,572 |
| Rolle Pass (Predazzo to San Martino di Castrozza and Primiero), road | 1,984 | 6,509 |
| Forcella Forada (Caprile to San Vito), bridle path | 1,975 | 6,480 |
| San Pellegrino Pass (Moena to Cencenighe), road | 1,910 | 6,267 |
| Campolongo Pass (Corvara to Arabba), road | 1,875 | 6,152 |
| Forcella d'Alleghe (Alleghe to the Zoldo Glen), footpath | 1,820 | 5,971 |
| Tre Croci Pass (Cortina to Auronzo), road | 1,808 | 5,932 |
| Furkel Pass (Mareo to Olang), road | 1,759 | 5,771 |
| Karerpass or Costalunga Pass (Welschnofen to Vigo di Fassa), road | 1,753 | 5,751 |
| Kreuzbergpass or Monte Croce Pass (Innichen and Sexten to the Piave Valley and Belluno), road | 1,638 | 5,374 |
| Ampezzo Pass (Toblach to Cortina and Belluno), path | 1,544 | 5,066 |
| Cereda Pass (Primiero to Agordo), road | 1,372 | 4,501 |
| Toblach Pass (Bruneck to Lienz), railway | 1,209 | 3,967 |

== Major parks ==
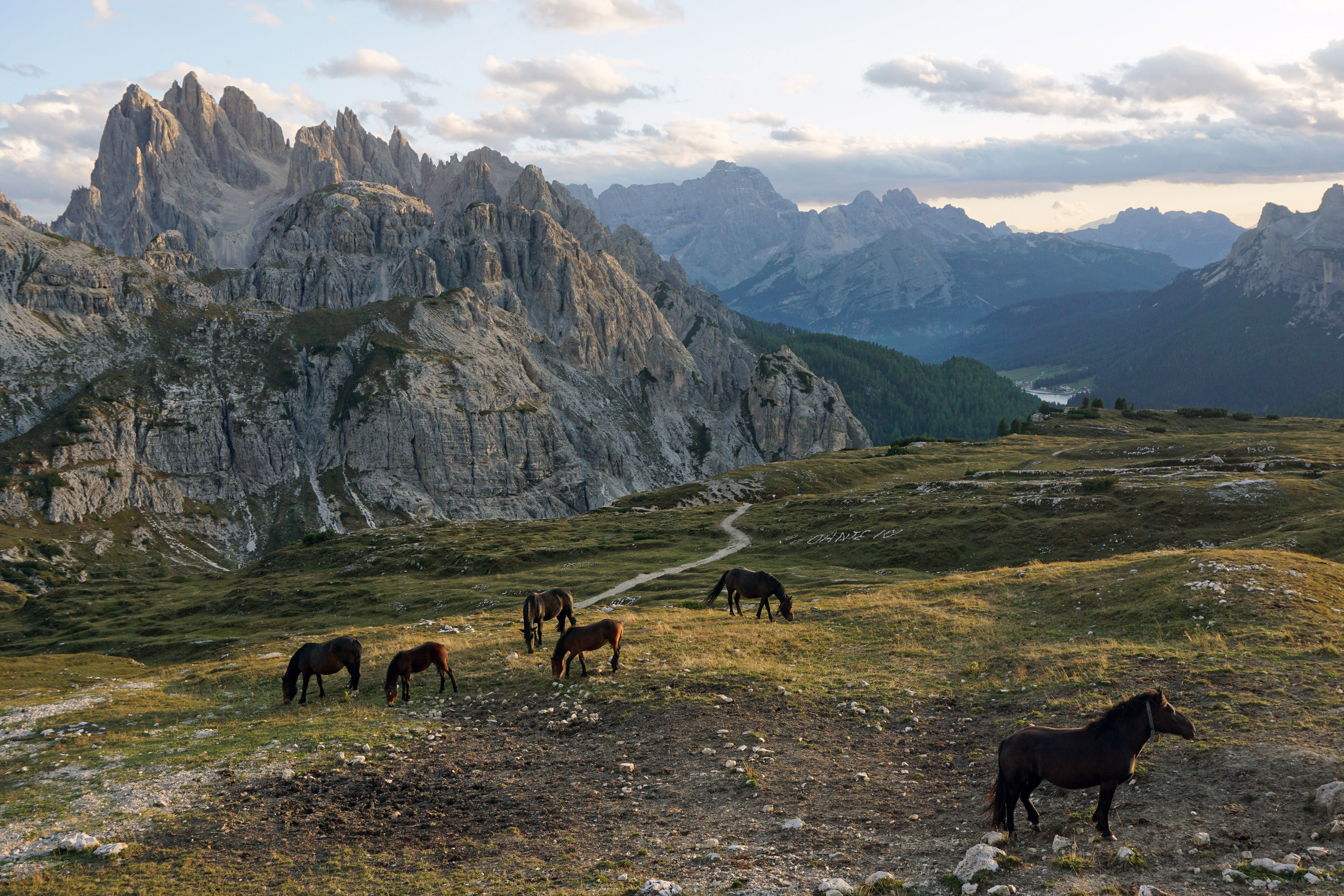
Horses on pasture at Parco Naturale Tre Cime, South Tyrol. Cadini di Misurina in the background

- Dolomiti Bellunesi National Park 3,200 ha (7,900 acres)
- Ampezzo Dolomites Natural Park 11,200 ha (28,000 acres)
- Naturpark Fanes-Sennes-Prags 25,485 ha (62,970 acres)
- Paneveggio-Pale di San Martino Natural Park 19,726.09 ha (48,744.2 acres)
- Schlern-Rosengarten Nature Park 6,796 ha (16,790 acres)
- Naturpark Sextener Dolomiten 11,600 ha (29,000 acres)
- Puez-Geisler Nature Park 10,196 ha (25,190 acres)
- Adamello Brenta Natural Park 62,051 ha (153,330 acres)
- Friulian Dolomites Natural Park 36,950 ha (91,300 acres)

== See also ==
- Alta Via 1
- Belluno
- Brenta group
- Dolomiti Bellunesi National Park
- Golden age of alpinism
- Italian front (World War I)
- Silver age of alpinism
- Strada delle 52 Gallerie
- Via ferrata
- White Friday (1916)
- White War

== Bibliography ==
- Provincia di Belluno, Provincia Autonoma di Bolzano-Alto Adige Autonome Provinz Bozen-Südtirol, Provincia di Pordenone, Provincia Autonoma di Trento, Provincia di Udine, Regione Autonoma Friuli-Venezia Giulia, 2008. Nomination of the Dolomites for inscription on the World Natural Heritage List UNESCO. Nomination Document. 363 pp. https://web.archive.org/web/20131225070444/http://fondazionedolomitiunesco.org/documentazione-2/01_DOLOMITES_nomination_document_jan2008_1236608233_1294933181.pdf
- Bainbridge, William (2020). Topographic Memory and Victorian Travellers in the Dolomite Mountains. Amsterdam: Amsterdam University Press. ISBN 978-94-6298-761-6.
- "HD Pictures of the main areas of the Dolomites". Bruno Mandolesi.
- "360 degree panorama Dolomites". SiMedia Srl. Archived from the original on 26 January 2011.
- Roger. "Walks and Via Ferrata in the Dolomites". CommunityWalk.com. Archived from the original on 8 January 2018.
- "Strada delle 52 Gallerie". Eclectica.
- "Monte Piana in the Dolomites". Eclectica. August 21, 2006.
- "Via Ferrata Lagazuoi Tunnels". Eclectica. August 9, 2006.
- "Up to the Turquoise Lake". Eclectica. August 1, 2006.
