= Vernal =

Vernal may refer to:

== Places ==
- Vernal, Mississippi, unincorporated community in Greene County, Mississippi, United States
- Vernal, Utah, city in Uintah County, Utah, United States
- Vernal Fall, waterfall in Yosemite National Park, California, United States
- Vernal (crater), impact crater on Mars

== People ==
- Ewen Vernal (born 1964), Scottish musician
- Irène Vernal (1912–2008), Belgian actress
- Mike Vernal (born 1980), American venture capitalist
- Vernal Charles (1985–2013), South African cricketer

== Other uses ==
- Vernal point, the point on the celestial sphere where the Sun is located during the northern spring equinox
- Vernal pool, temporary pools of water that provide habitat for distinctive plants and animals
- Vernal keratoconjunctivitis is an allergic conjunctivitis associated with springtime

== See also ==
- Vernel (disambiguation)
- Vernalization
- Spring (disambiguation)
