= Vernel =

Vernel, Vernell, or Vernelle may refer to:

== People ==
=== Surnames ===
- Brian Vernel, Scottish actor
- Lil Phat (Melvin Vernell III), American rapper

=== Given names ===
==== Vernel ====
- Vernel Bagneris (1949-), American playwright
- Vernel Fournier (1928-2000), American jazz drummer

==== Vernell ====
- Vernell Brown Jr. (1971–2022), American jazz and rhythm and blues pianist, composer, arranger
- Vernell Brown III (born 2006), American football player
- Vernell Coleman (1918-1990), American community organizer
- Vernell "Bimbo" Coles (1968-), American basketball player

==== Vernelle ====
- Vernelle FitzPatrick, American diplomat

== Other uses ==
- Vernel, a household chemical produced by Vernel Traders Pakistan
- La Vernelle, French commune
- Gran Vernel, a mountain in Italy

== See also ==
- Vernal (disambiguation)
