= Harvey (software) =

AI services for legal teams

- Type: Private
- Industry: Artificial intelligence, software
- Founded: 2022; 4 years ago
- Founder: Winston Weinberg (CEO), Gabriel Pereyra (president)
- Headquarters: San Francisco, California, US
- Products: Harvey
- Revenue: ▲$190 million (2025)
- Parent: Counsel AI Corporation
- Website: harvey.ai

Harvey is a generative artificial intelligence (AI) product developed by the Counsel AI Corporation for the legal industry. (Note: 'Harvey' is often used to refer to both the product and the company which develops and operates the product (i.e. Counsel AI Corporation).) The product has been described as a provider of customised large language models (LLMs) for law firms and in-house legal teams. It is named after the lead character of the legal drama Suits, Harvey Specter.

== History ==
Harvey was founded in the summer of 2022 by Winston Weinberg, who was a securities and antitrust litigator at O'Melveny & Myers, and Gabriel Pereyra, who was a research scientist at Google DeepMind and Meta.

Pereyra and Weinberg were roommates in Los Angeles. Pereyra was brainstorming startup ideas with his research colleagues. He showed Weinberg OpenAI's GPT-3 text-generating system, and Weinberg realized that it could be used to improve legal workflows.

They developed an early chain-of-thought prompt based on GPT-3, focused on California tenant law. They ran the model on 100 legal questions from a public forum and hired three attorneys to evaluate the answers and determine whether they could be sent to clients unchanged. Out of those 100 questions, 86 were approved. After that, Pereyra and Weinberg contacted Sam Altman and Jason Kwon, General Counsel at OpenAI, about their results.

Shortly after, on July 4, 2022, they met with OpenAI's C-suite, and OpenAI became their seed investor. OpenAI also gave Pereyra and Weinberg early access to GPT-4.

Gordon Moodie, a corporate partner at Wachtell, Lipton, Rosen & Katz, also joined Harvey in July 2023 as the company's chief product officer.

In March 2024, Harvey had 82 employees and stated that it intended to double that figure by the end of 2024. The company has reportedly hired a large number of lawyers, including from White & Case, Latham & Watkins, Skadden, Gunderson Dettmer, Katten Muchin Rosenman, and Paul Weiss. Harvey CEO Weinberg explained that many members of the company's sales team were formerly attorneys at 'Big Law', i.e. large US law firms, and that the sales team's experience was useful in convincing attorneys to trial the company's software. The integration of former 'Big Law' attorneys into product and sales teams has been attributed as a major factor in Harvey's success.

In February 2026, Harvey announced its first brand partnership with actor Gabriel Macht, who portrayed the character Harvey Specter in Suits, to launch the company's Instagram page.

In May 2026, it was announced the company is sponsoring the Golden State Valkyries and the New York Liberty.

In August 2026, Harvey announced Tenet, a model developed from Moonshot AI's Kimi K3, post-trained in collaboration with Fireworks AI. Harvey claimed performance exceeding K3, Anthropic's Fable 5, and OpenAI's GPT-5.6 Sol in some legal benchmarks.

== Funding ==
In November 2022, it was reported that Harvey raised US$5 million in funding led by the OpenAI Startup Fund, together with other investors such as Jeff Dean, the head of Google AI, Elad Gil, the founder of Mixer Labs, Sarah Guo, the founder of Conviction, and other angel investors.

Harvey raised another $23 million in April 2023 in a funding round led by Sequoia Capital.

Harvey announced in December 2023 that it had raised $80 million in a Series B funding round led by Elad Gil and Kleiner Perkins which valued the company at $715 million. Other investors in the round included Sequoia Capital and the OpenAI Startup Fund.

In July 2024, Harvey announced that it had raised $100 million in a Series C funding round that valued the company at $1.5 billion. The round was led by venture capital firm GV, and other participants included OpenAI, Kleiner Perkins, Sequoia Capital, Elad Gil, and SV Angel.

In February 2025, Harvey announced it had raised $300 million in a Series D funding round that valued the company at $3 billion. Just months later, in June 2025, Harvey closed a $300 million Series E co-led by Kleiner Perkins and Coatue Management, again with participation from Conviction, Elad Gil, OpenAI, and Sequoia, boosting its valuation to about $5 billion and supporting international growth and expanded legal product offerings.

In December 2025, Harvey secured a $160 million Series F round led by Andreessen Horowitz, with continued participation from investors including EQT, WndrCo, Sequoia, Kleiner Perkins, Conviction, and Elad Gil, valuing the legal AI company at roughly $8 billion.

In March 2026, Harvey raised $200 million at a valuation of $11 billion, in a round co-led by GIC and Sequoia Capital.

In September 2026, Harvey announced that it had raised $550 million at a valuation of $15.5 billion, in a round co-led by Diffusion Capital Partners and Lightspeed Venture Partners.

== Features ==
In May 2024, Harvey launched its products on Microsoft Azure and stated that it would offer a Harvey on Azure version of its product going forward. It was also reported that Harvey would begin offering general commercial access to some of its products, such as its case law models, as well as product bundles that included its AI assistant, specialised models, and its Vault feature for running prompts on large document collections.

== Applications ==
US law firm Paul Weiss began testing Harvey within the firm in January 2023, and became a client of the company later that year. Gina Lynch, the firm's chief knowledge and innovation officer, explained that the firm was not using hard metrics, such as time saved, to assess productivity gains because the time and effort needed to carefully review the output made efficiency gains difficult to measure.

In February 2023, the UK law firm, Allen & Overy (now A&O Shearman), announced that it had been trialing Harvey since November 2022 within its Markets Innovation Group. This was reported to be the first known use of a generative AI product within the UK magic circle law firms.

According to Allen & Overy, during the trial, 3,500 lawyers had used Harvey for around 40,000 queries in the course of their day to day work. The firm's press release stated that "Whilst the output needs careful review by an A&O lawyer, Harvey can help generate insights, recommendations and predictions based on large volumes of data". David Wakeling, head of the Markets Innovation Group, also cautioned that "You must validate everything coming out of the system. You have to check everything".

The Irish law firm, A&L Goodbody, announced in February 2024 that it would be working with Harvey to enhance its services in relation to document analysis, due diligence, litigation, and regulatory compliance.

In June 2024, UK law firm Ashurst announced that it would partner with Harvey and roll out its services to its branches worldwide.

In September 2024, PwC announced that it would be adopting Harvey to empower its lawyers in Singapore. Singapore law firm WongPartnership also announced that month that it had become the first Southeast Asian law firm to test Harvey's generative AI solutions.
