= Geological Museum of the Dolomites =

Coordinates: 46.312904°N 11.602725°E

- Museo Geologico delle Dolomiti
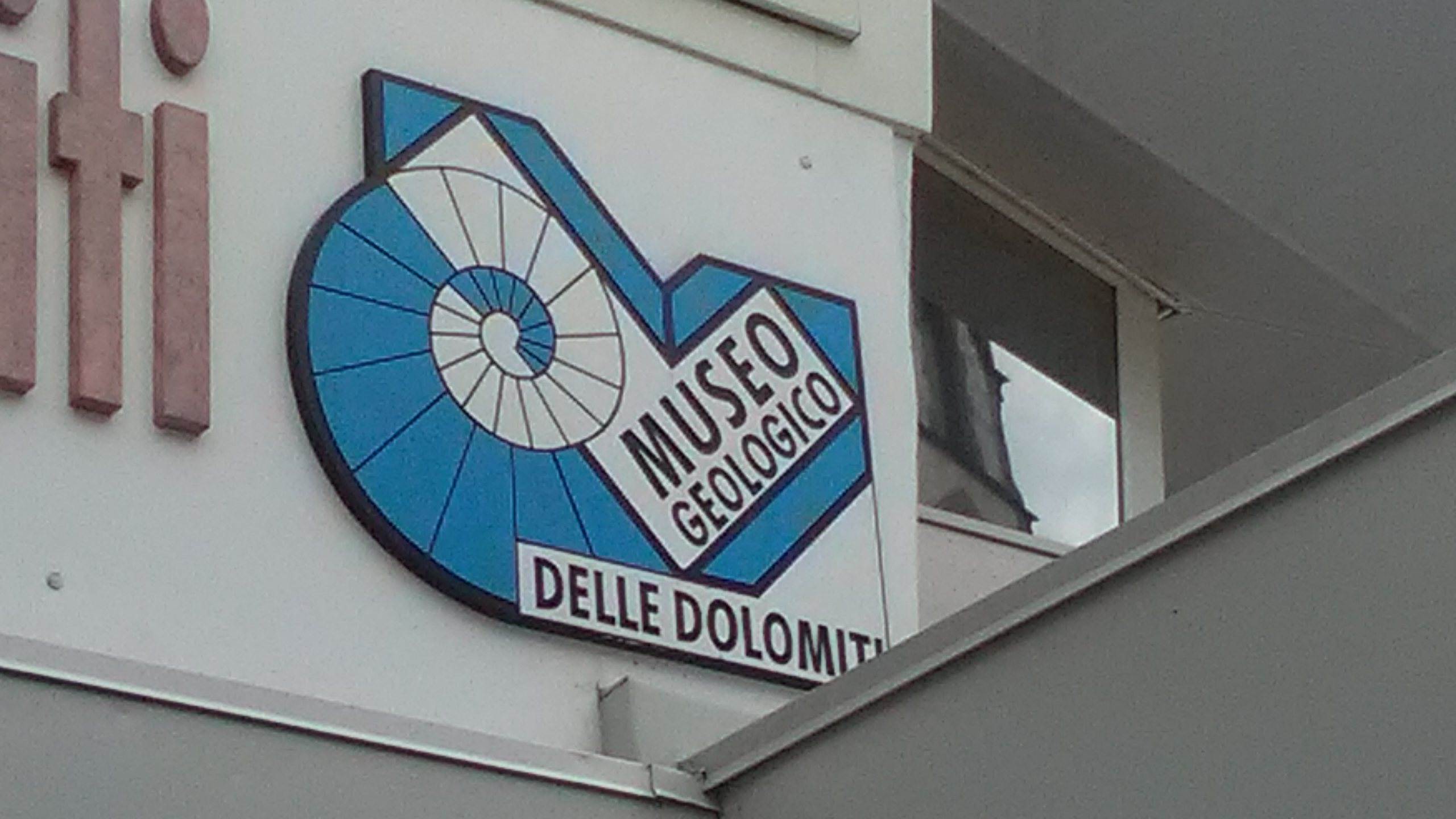

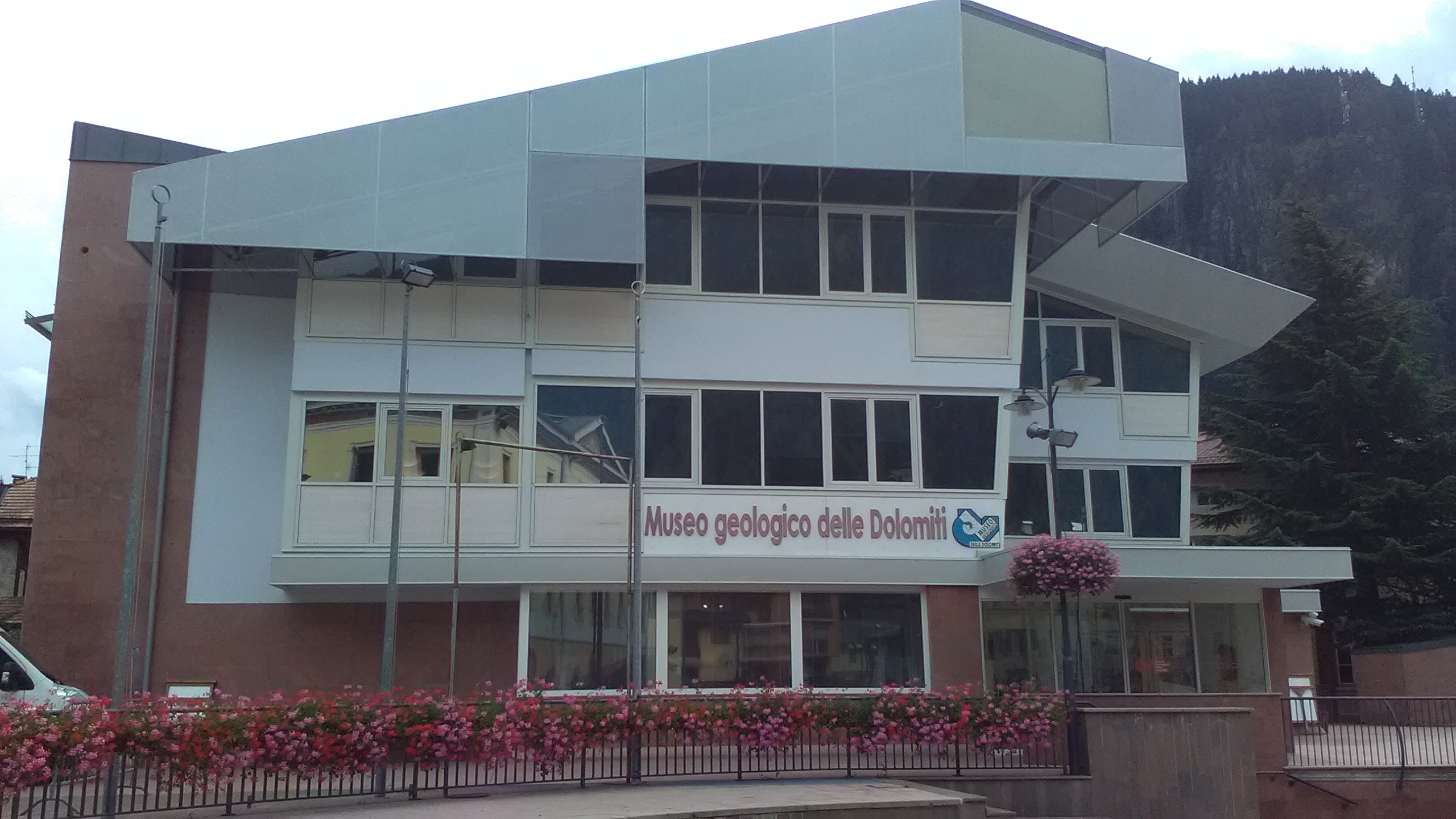

- Location within Trentino-Alto Adige/Südtirol
- Established: 1899
- Location: Piazza Santi Filippo e Giacomo 1, Predazzo, Trentino, Italy
- Type: Geological museum
- Website: www.muse.it/en/visita/Muse-sul-Territorio/Pages/Museo-geologico-delle-Dolomiti-di-Predazzo.aspx

The Geological Museum of the Dolomites (in Italian Museo Geologico delle Dolomiti) is located in Predazzo, Fiemme Valley, in the Trentino province of Italy. It is managed by the Comune of Predazzo and the Science Museum (MUSE) of Trento since 2012.

== History ==
Interest in the geology of the Dolomites started in the 18th century, in the form of explorers and naturalists from all over the world. By the 19th century, geologists and scientists made the hotel "Nave D'Oro" (Golden Ship) in Predazzo the base for their explorations: Alexander von Humboldt, Jean Baptiste Elie de Beaumont, Charles Lyell, Roderick Murchison, Amelia Edwards and many more.

The museum was founded in 1899 in order publicize the geological and natural heritage of the Dolomites through exhibits of minerals, fossils, rocks, etc. The collection, after a few moves in the 20th century, is now housed in the former "house of tourism and handicraft" in the main square of Predazzo.

In 2009, as part of the representation for the Dolomites themselves, the museum was inserted in the World Heritage List by UNESCO.

In 2012 it became part of the MUSE (Science Museum of Trento).The refurbishment of summer 2015 enhanced the collection and the museum itself.

== Exposition ==
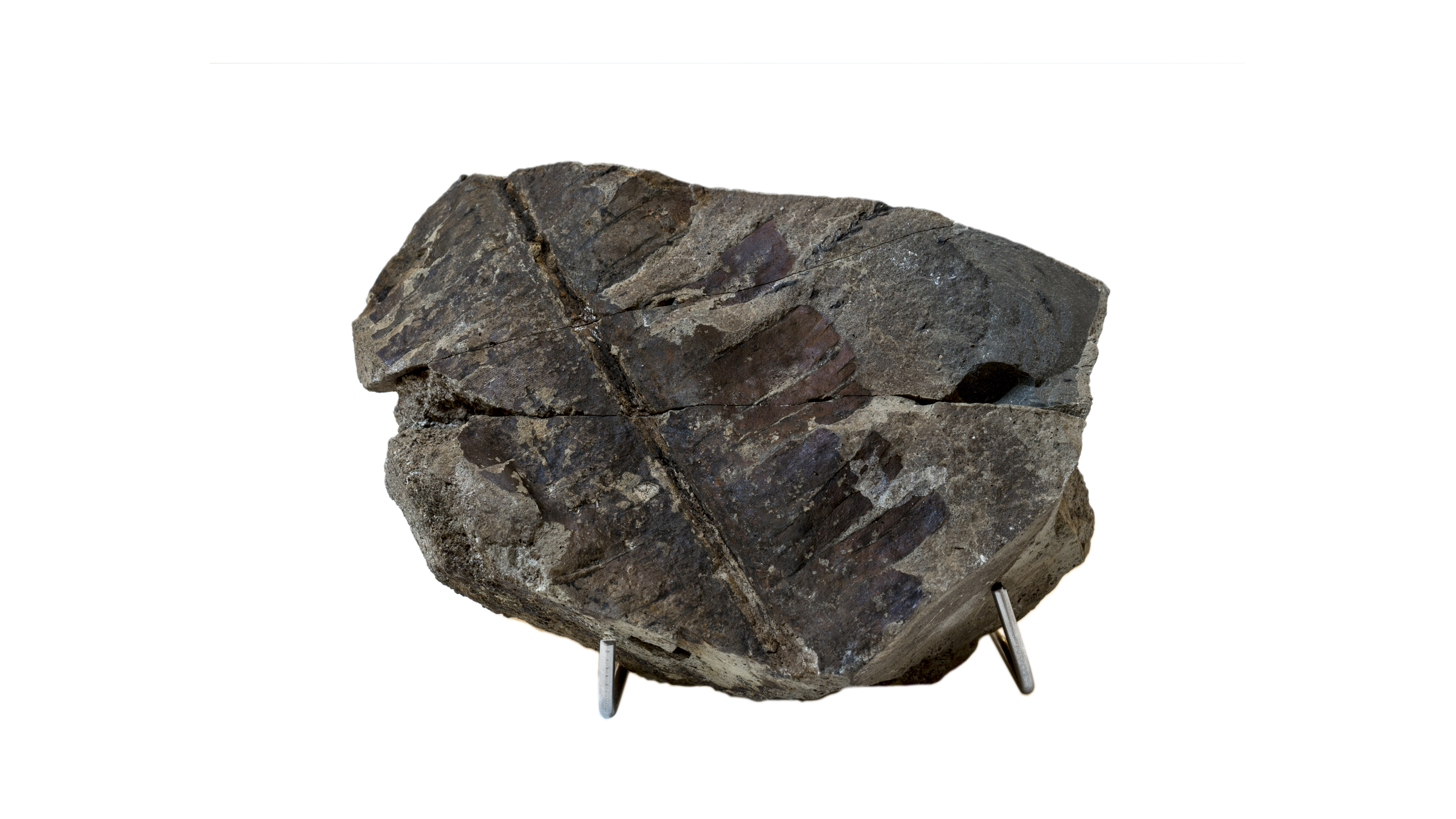
Bjuvia fossil from Triassic (240 million years ago), coming from Agnello Mountain, Predazzo

The museum owns more than 12,000 items, both geologic and fossil, and the largest collection of invertebrate fossils of the Middle Triassic epoch in all Italy. It manages also an external educational itinerary, called "Dos Capèl geological path" (from Italian: Sentiero Geologico del Dos Capèl), that can be visited during summer.

After the refurbishment of 2015, the hall replicates a room of the hotel "Nave d'Oro" (Golden Ship), with testimonials of the flourishing scientific and geological studies of the 18th century. The ground floor hosts an exposition about the history of the Dolomites and their scientific discovery. In the basement it is possible to explore the different mountain chains of the Fiemme Valley and Fassa Valley: Lagorai, Latemar, Catinaccio, Marmolada-Monzoni and Sella.

The museum hosts also a scientific library with over 4,000 volumes regarding geology, mineralogy and paleontology, with a specific section dedicated to history and antiques.

== Dos Capèl geological path ==
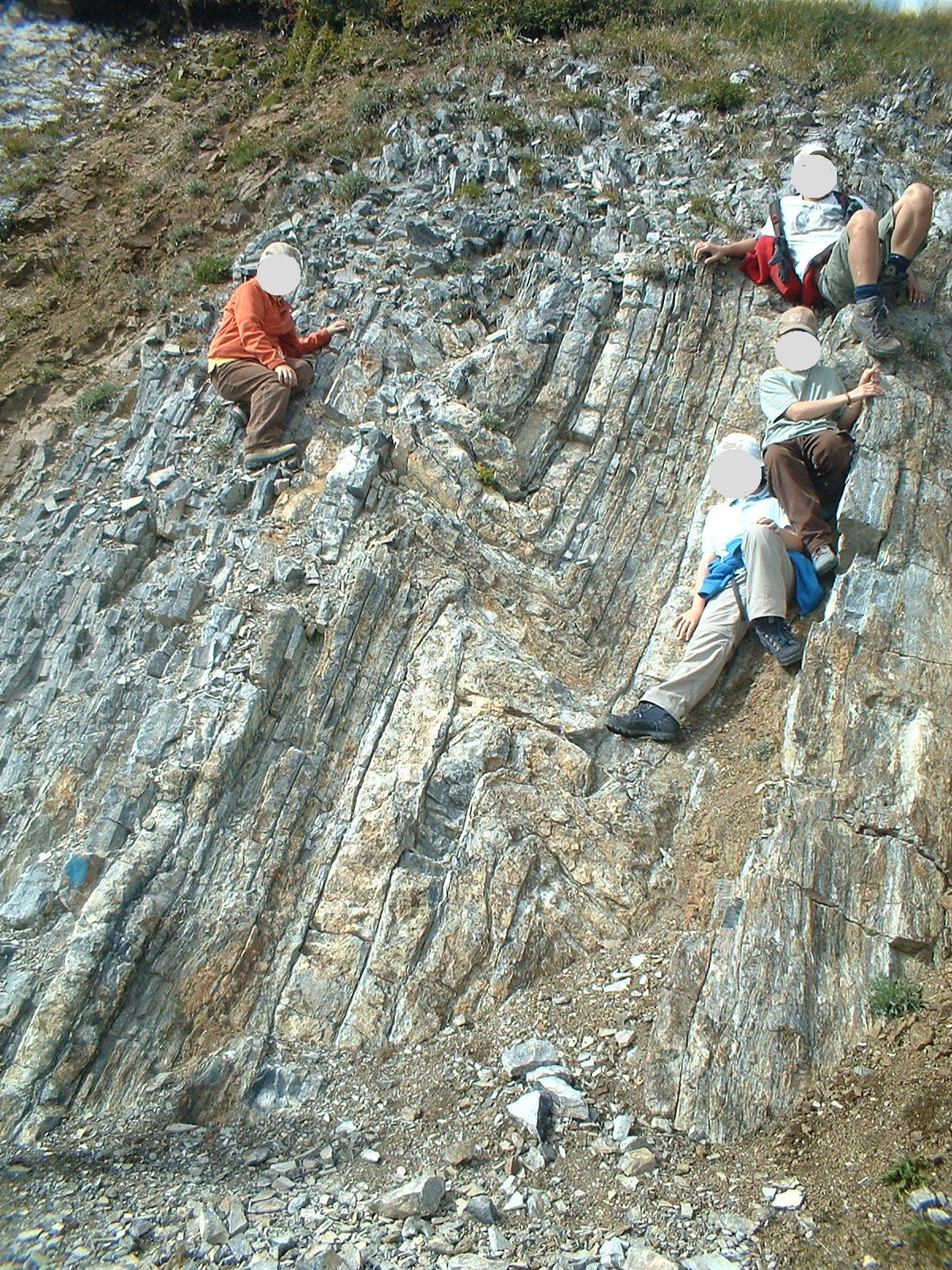
Kink band in sedimentary sequence (Livinallongo Formation, Ladinico Inferiore, Dos Capèl geological path, Predazzo)

The "Dos Capèl geological path" (in Italian: sentiero geologico del Dos Capèl) is an educational and hiking itinerary. It is 9.7 km (6.0 mi) long and the level of difficulty is not high. Created in 1970, it was restored around 2000 and connected to the Museum of Predazzo as its open-air extension. The starting point is located in Pampeago (1860 m a.s.l.) and consists of a circular itinerary around the mountain Dos Capèl (2200 m a.s.l.) with 32 steps having informative panels, pictures and descriptions, in order to learn and observe in person. It is possible to reach this itinerary also from Passo Feudo, by the cable car of Ski Center Latemar.

== See also ==
- Dolomites
- Predazzo
