= Piz Boè =

Mountain in Italy

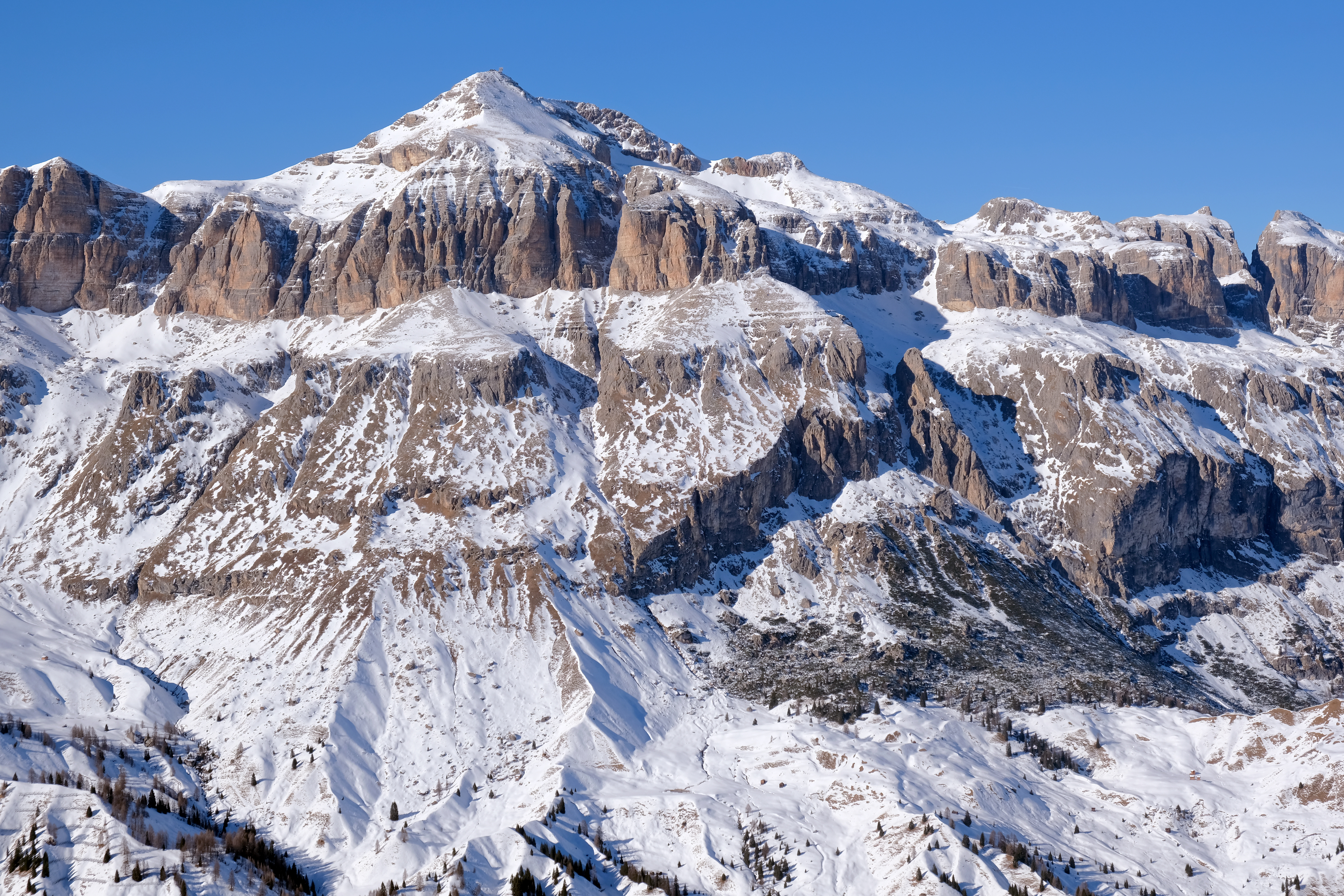
- Piz Boè seen from Marmolada

Highest point
- Elevation: 3,152 m (10,341 ft)
- Prominence: 939 m (3,081 ft)
- Listing: Alpine mountains above 3000 m; Mountains of Italy
- Coordinates: 46°30′32″N 11°49′41″E

Geography
- Location within Alps
- Location: Dolomites, Italy
- Parent range: Sella group (Dolomites)

Piz Boè is the highest mountain of the Sella group, a mountain range in the Dolomites, Italy. It has an elevation of 3,152 metres (10,341 ft).

Located in the heart of the Dolomites, the mountain has a beautiful pyramid summit. Its popularity has increased as it is thought of as the easiest 3000m summit to reach in the Dolomites, and can get overcrowded in the summer. It lies just above the Pordoi Pass. Due to its location, most of the major Dolomiten peaks are visible from its summit.

== View from the top ==
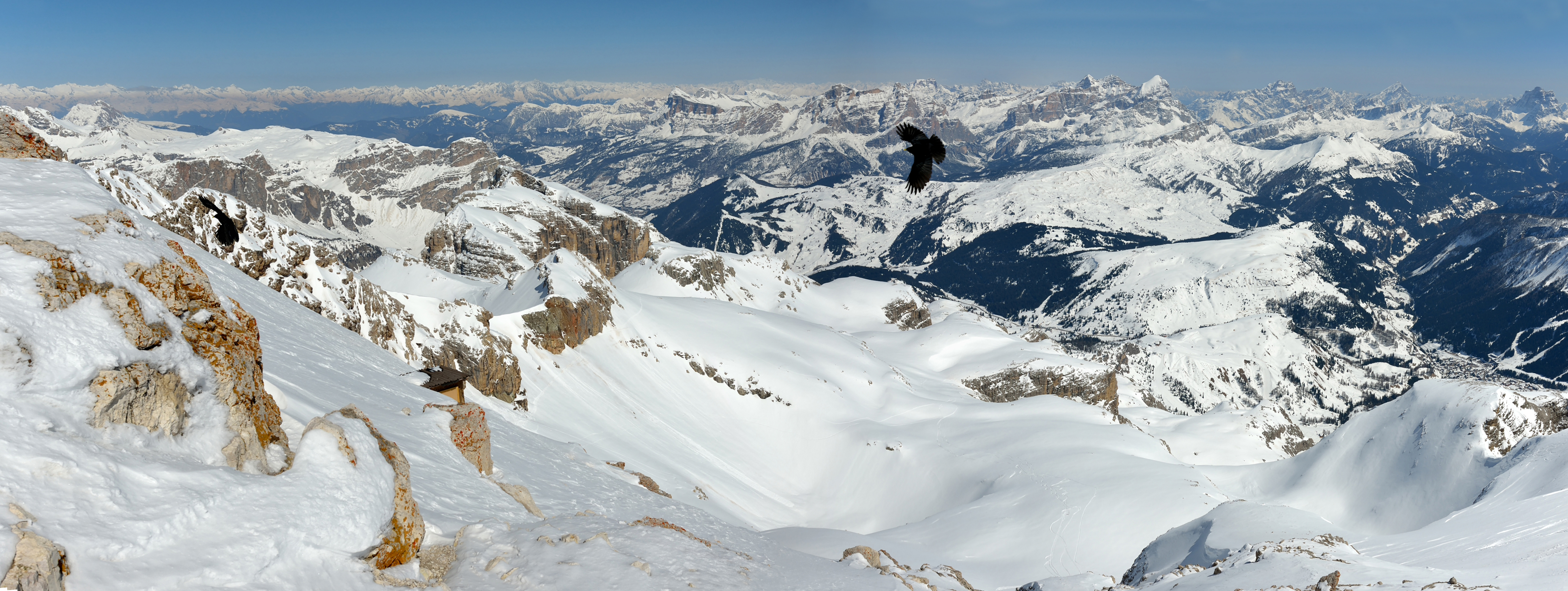
View to NE

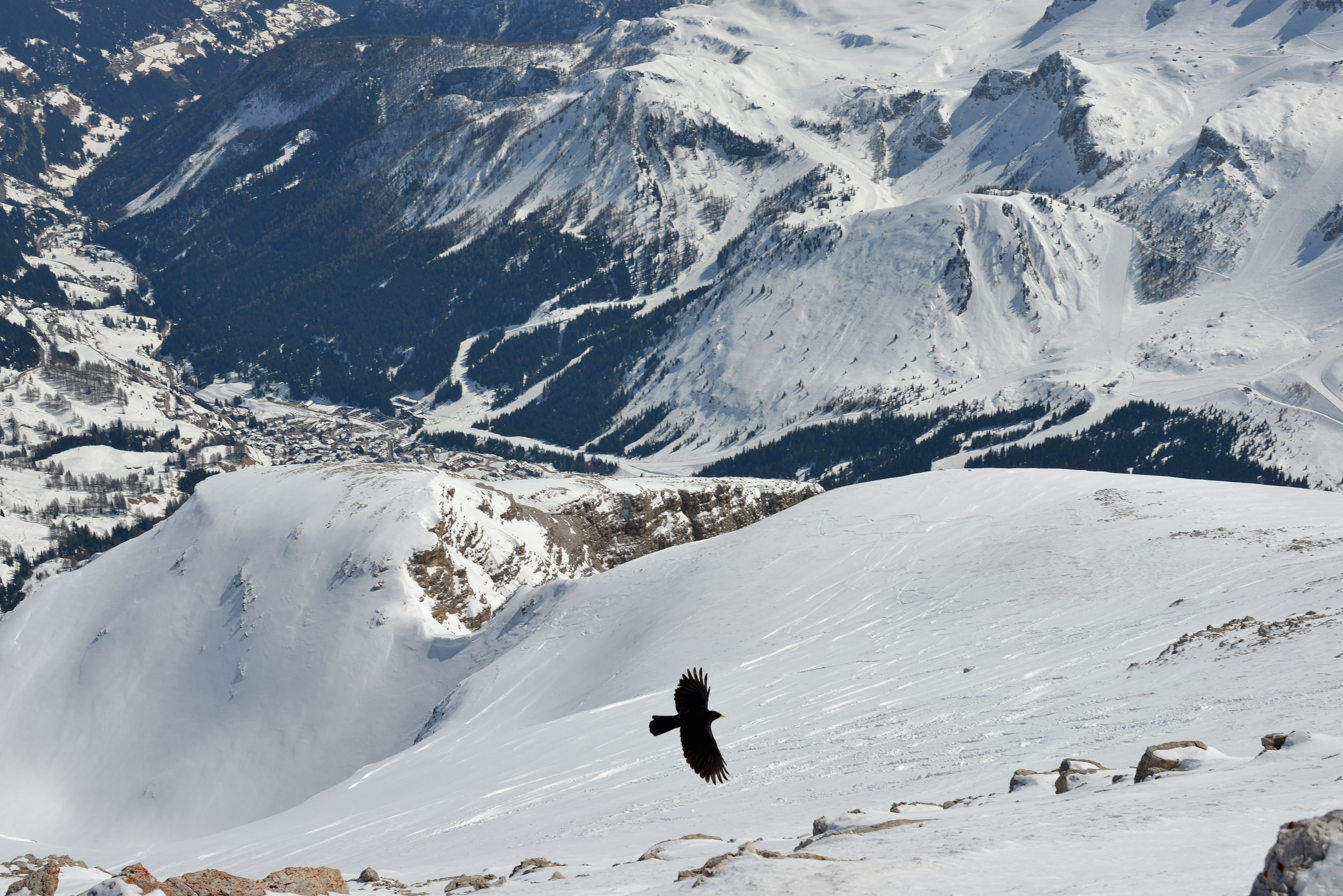
View to ESE

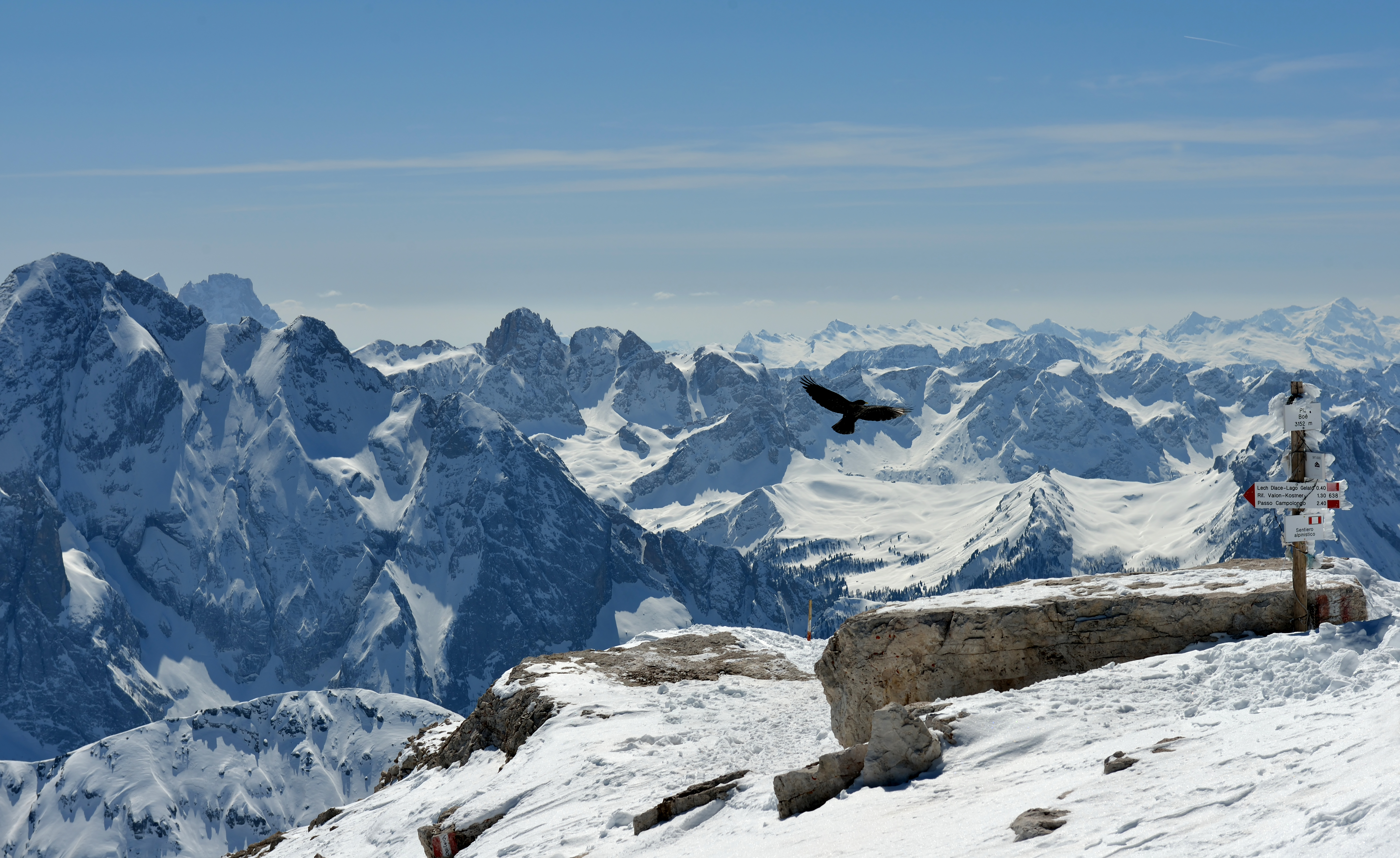
View to SW

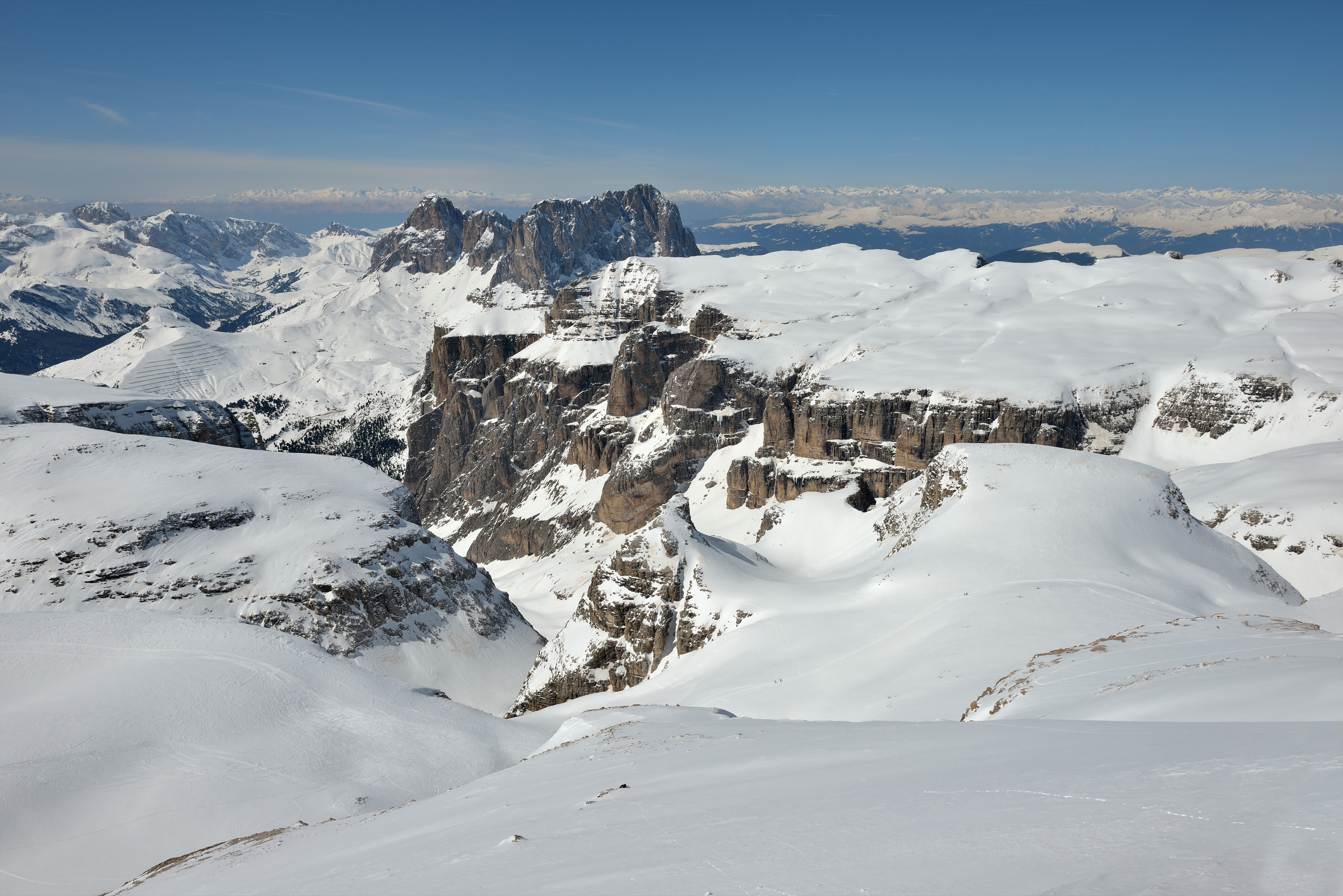
View to W

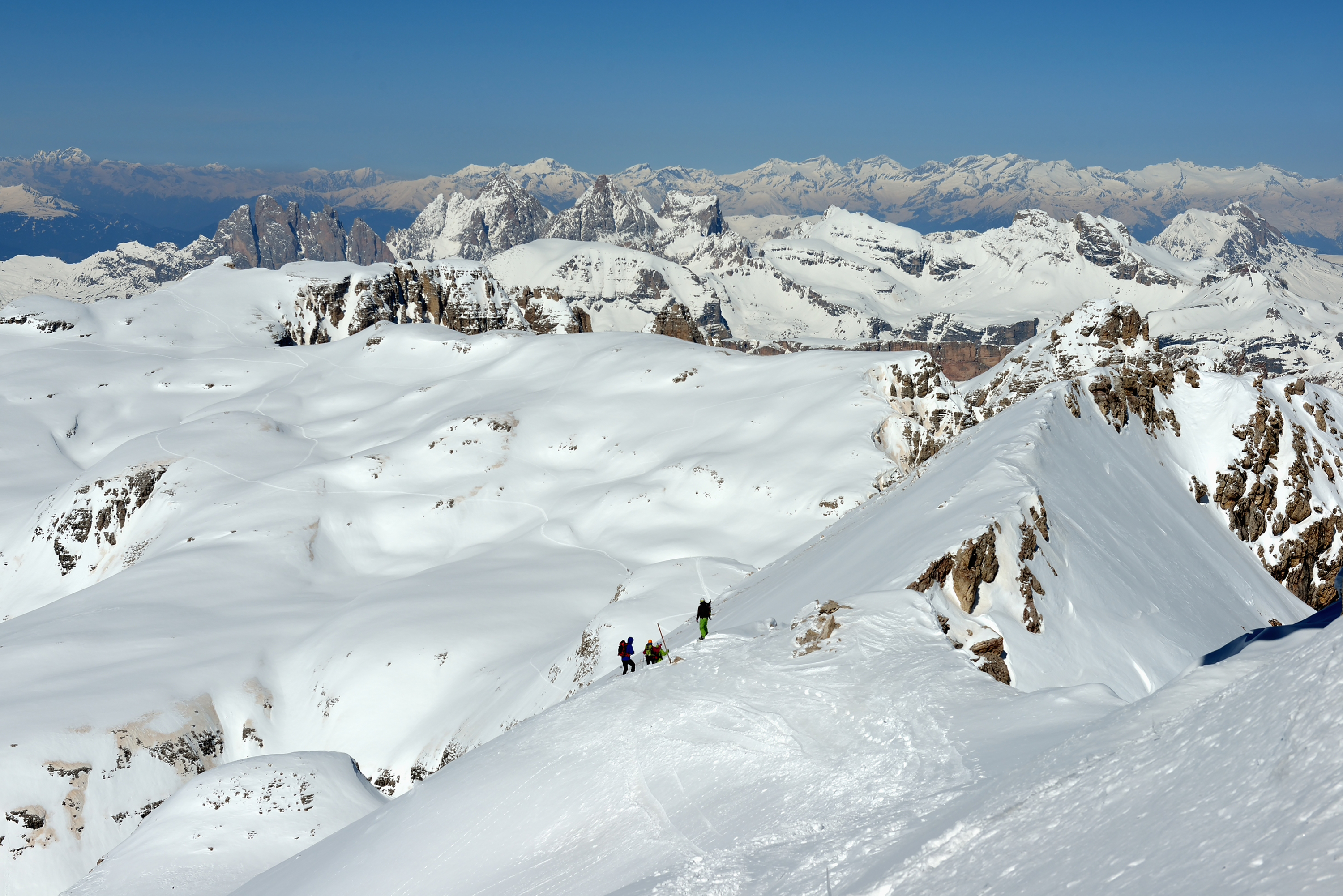
View to N
