= Sasso di Bosconero =

Mountain in Italy

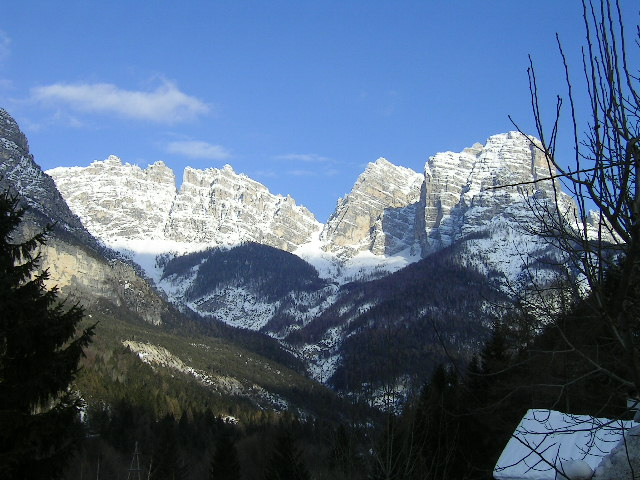
- Sasso di Bosconero (middle peak)

Highest point
- Elevation: 2,468 m (8,097 ft)
- Prominence: 938 m (3,077 ft)
- Coordinates: 46°20′11″N 12°16′05″E

Geography
- Location within Alps
- Location: Veneto, Italy
- Parent range: Dolomites

Climbing
- First ascent: 1878

Sasso di Bosconero (Italian pronunciation: [ˈsasso di boskoˈneːro]) (2,468 m) is the highest mountain of the Bosconero Range, a subgroup of the southern Dolomites in Veneto, Italy. It appears as a giant pyramid that hangs over the Zoldo Valley, near the town of Longarone. It was first climbed in 1878 by Cesare Tomè and Gottfried Merzbacher along with local guide Santo Siorpaes.
