= Sarah Guo =

American venture capitalist

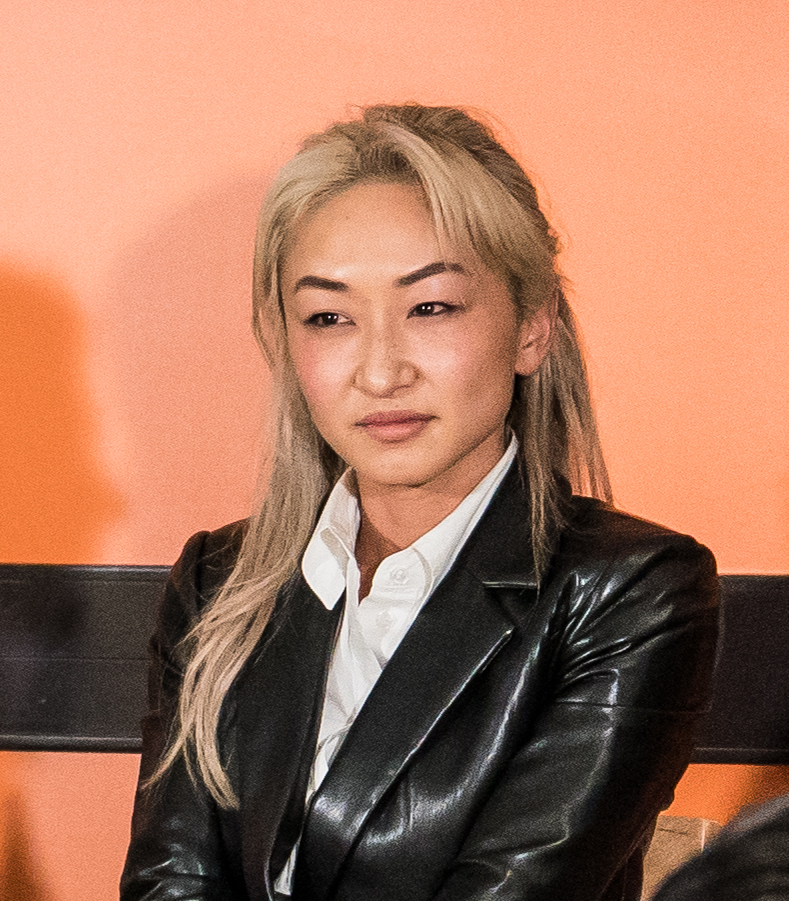
- Guo in 2024
- Education: University of Pennsylvania (BA, BS, MBA, MA)
- Occupation: Investor
- Organization: Conviction
- Website: sarahguo.com

Sarah Guo is an American venture capitalist. She is the founder of the venture capital firm Conviction and formerly a general partner at Greylock Partners.

== Early life ==
Guo grew up in Wisconsin, and was a competitive figure skater as a child. Guo's father, Jerry Guo, emigrated from Hunan, China, to the United States in 1987 after graduating from Tsinghua University. Her mother, Lucy Xie, an assistant professor (engineering), followed a year later, and both were hired by Bell Labs. In 2003, her father founded Casa Systems, a broadband equipment company based in Andover, Massachusetts, which her mother later joined. Guo built the company's first website at age 14 and was pitching the company to investors by 19. Casa went public on the Nasdaq in December 2017 at a market capitalization of roughly $1.2 billion, though eventually filing for Chapter 11 bankruptcy in 2024.

== Education ==
After attending Phillips Academy, she graduated from the University of Pennsylvania and its Wharton School. In 5 years, she earned a Bachelor of Arts, a Bachelor of Science, a Master of Business Administration (M.B.A.), and a Master of Arts from the University of Pennsylvania.

== Career ==
Guo moved to San Francisco in 2012 to work at Goldman Sachs, where she worked on Workday's initial public offering. She was recruited to in 2013 to Greylock by Aneel Bhusri, Workday's CEO and a Greylock partner.

At Greylock, Guo along with GP John Lilly, invested in the Series A of Figma and worked on Musical.ly, the app that later became TikTok. She previously served on the boards of Awake Security (acquired by Arista), SkyHigh (acquired by McAfee), Demisto (acquired by Palo Alto Networks), Sqreen (acquired by Datadog), Common Room (acquired by Zoom), Multi (acquired by OpenAI) and Voyage AI (acquired by MongoDB).

At 28, she became the firm's youngest General Partner.

Guo left Greylock in July 2022, and in October of that year, launched a new early-stage venture capital firm focused on AI with $101 million.

In 2025, Conviction raised a second fund in late 2024 with Mike Vernal.

Conviction's investments include early investments in Baseten, Chai Discovery, Cognition AI, OpenEvidence, Harvey, HeyGen,Instinct, Listen Labs, Mistral AI, Reflection AI, Sierra Platform, Sunday Robotics, and Thinking Machines Lab.

Guo appears in media outlets, as an expert in AI, infrastructure, business software, cybersecurity, technology policy and software engineering.

Guo is on the Midas List and the Midas Seed List of top investors, and in the Time 100 most influential people in AI.

She co-hosts the podcast No Priors with tech founder and super angel Elad Gil.
