= Schlern-Rosengarten Nature Park =

Nature park in South Tyrol, Italy

Coordinates: 46.51°N 11.59°E

Naturpark Schlern-Rosengarten
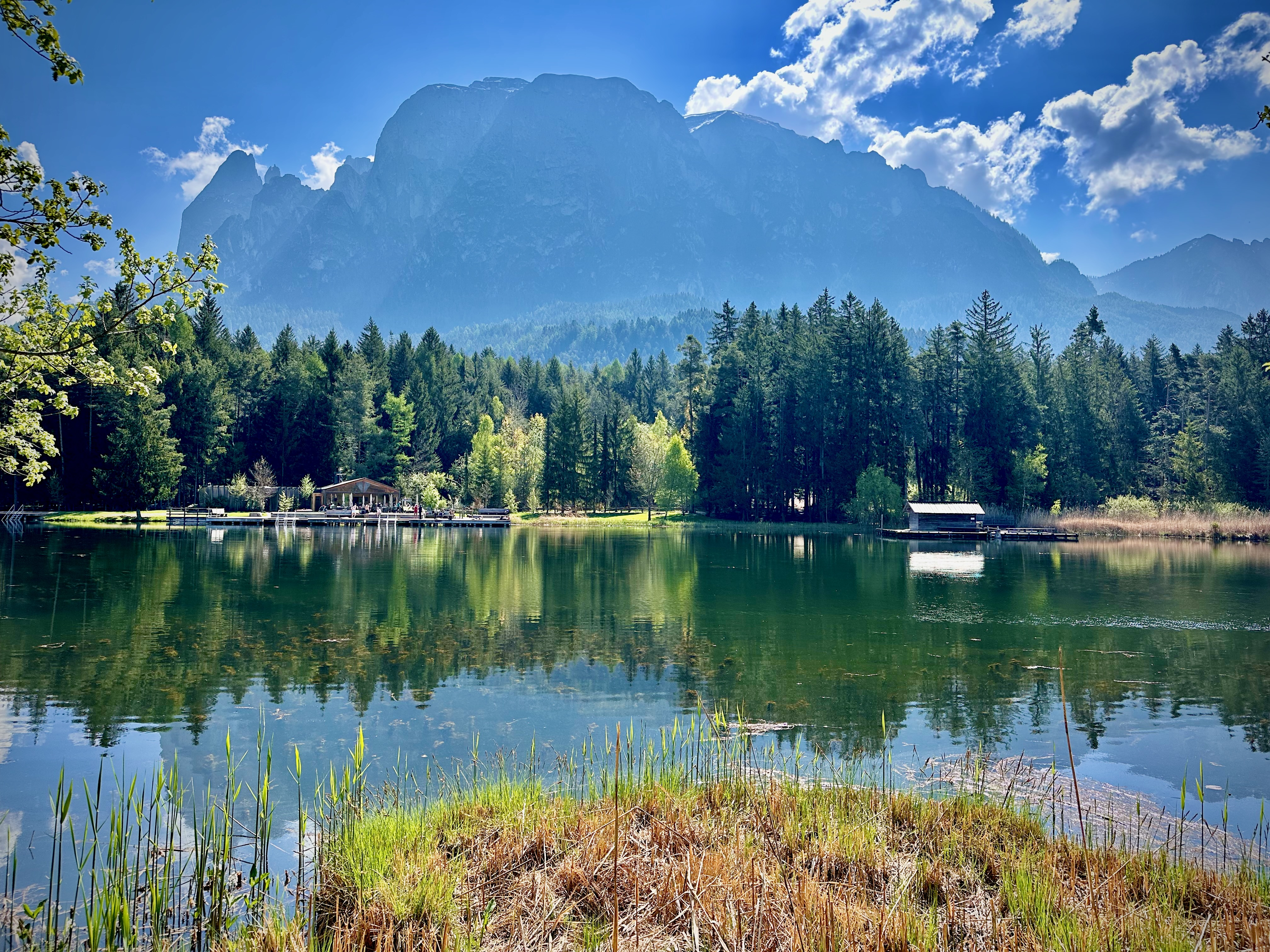
- Interactive map of Naturpark Schlern-Rosengarten
- Location: South Tyrol, Italy
- Area: 6,796 ha (16,793 acres)
- Established: 1974
- Website: www.provincia.bz.it/natura-territorio/temi/parco-naturale-sciliar-catinaccio.asp

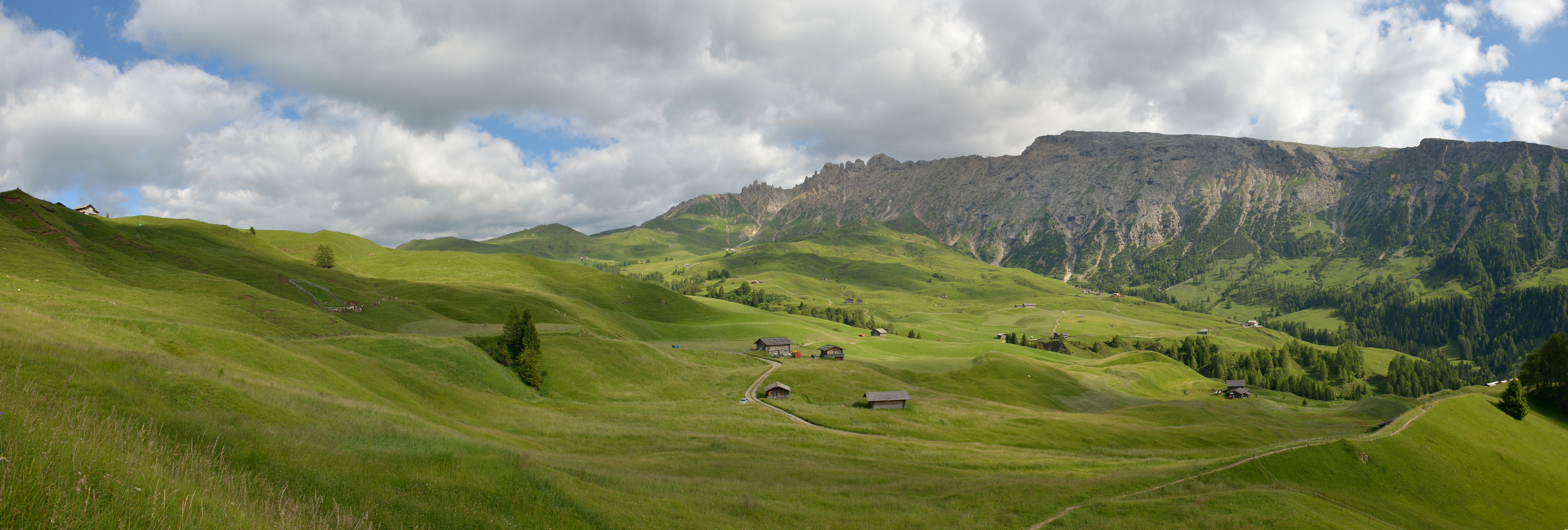
The Tschapit pastures on the Seiseralm

The Schlern-Rosengarten Nature Park (Italian: Parco Naturale Sciliar-Catinaccio; German: Naturpark Schlern-Rosengarten) is a nature reserve in South Tyrol, Italy.
