= OpenAI Startup Fund =

American venture capital fund

- Type: Private
- Industry: Venture capital
- Founded: May 2021; 5 years ago
- Founders: Sam Altman
- Headquarters: San Francisco, California, U.S.
- Key people: Sam Altman (founder)
- AUM: US$575 million committed (2026)
- Website: openai.fund

The OpenAI Startup Fund is an American venture capital fund affiliated with OpenAI. Founded in 2021 and headquartered in San Francisco, the fund invests in early-stage companies applying artificial intelligence to fields such as healthcare, law, education, energy and the sciences. Its capital originally came from outside limited partners including Microsoft.

== History ==
The OpenAI Startup Fund was announced in May 2021 with an initial size of $100 million, later increased to $175 million in committed capital. Ian Hathaway, previously an investor at the seed firm Haystack, joined OpenAI in 2021 to manage the fund.

In August 2026, the Wall Street Journal reported that OpenAI intended to raise a second venture vehicle of $400 million, this time however with OpenAI itself as the sole investor.
