= Gran Vernel =

Mountain in Italy

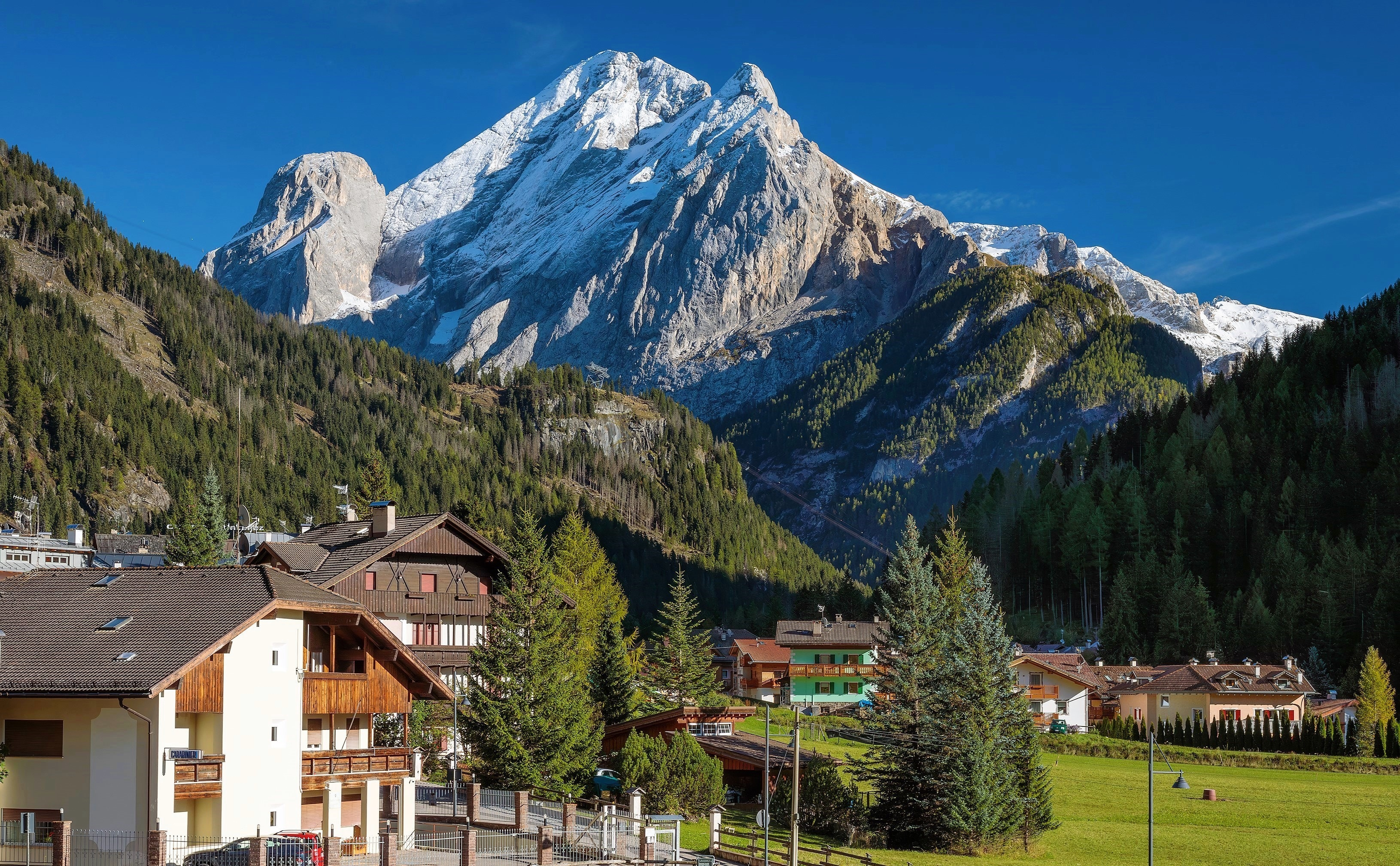
- Northwest aspect, from Canazei

Highest point
- Elevation: 3,210 m (10,531 ft)
- Prominence: 332 m (1,089 ft)
- Parent peak: Marmolada
- Isolation: 1.77 km (1.10 mi)
- Coordinates: 46°26′33″N 11°49′56″E

Geography
- Location within Italy
- Interactive map of Gran Vernel
- Country: Italy
- Province: Trentino
- Protected area: Dolomites World Heritage Site
- Parent range: Dolomites; Marmolada Group
- Topo map(s): Tabacco 07 Alta Badia, Arabba - Marmolada

Geology
- Rock age: Triassic
- Rock type: Dolomite

Climbing
- First ascent: 1879

Gran Vernel is a mountain in the province of Trentino in northern Italy.

== Description ==
Gran Vernel is a 3,210-meter-elevation (10,531-foot) summit that is ranked as the ninth-highest in the Dolomites, and as part of the Dolomites is a UNESCO World Heritage site. Set in the Trentino-Alto Adige/Südtirol region, the peak is located 5.5 kilometers (3.4 miles) southeast of the municipality of Canazei. Precipitation runoff from the mountain drains into the Avisio. Topographic relief is significant as the summit rises 1,560 meters (5,118 feet) above the Avisio in two kilometers (1.24 miles). The nearest higher neighbor is Marmolada, 1.77 kilometers (1.1 miles) to the southeast. The first ascent of Gran Vernel was made on July 8, 1879, by Gottfried Merzbacher, Cesare Tomè, Battista and Giorgio Bernard. The South Face was first climbed on July 21, 1898, by Eberhard Ramspeck (solo).

== Climate ==
Based on the Köppen climate classification, Gran Vernel is located in an alpine climate zone with long, cold winters, and short, mild summers. Weather systems are forced upwards by the mountains (orographic lift), causing moisture to drop in the form of rain and snow. The months of June through September offer the most favorable weather for visiting or climbing in this area.

== Gallery ==
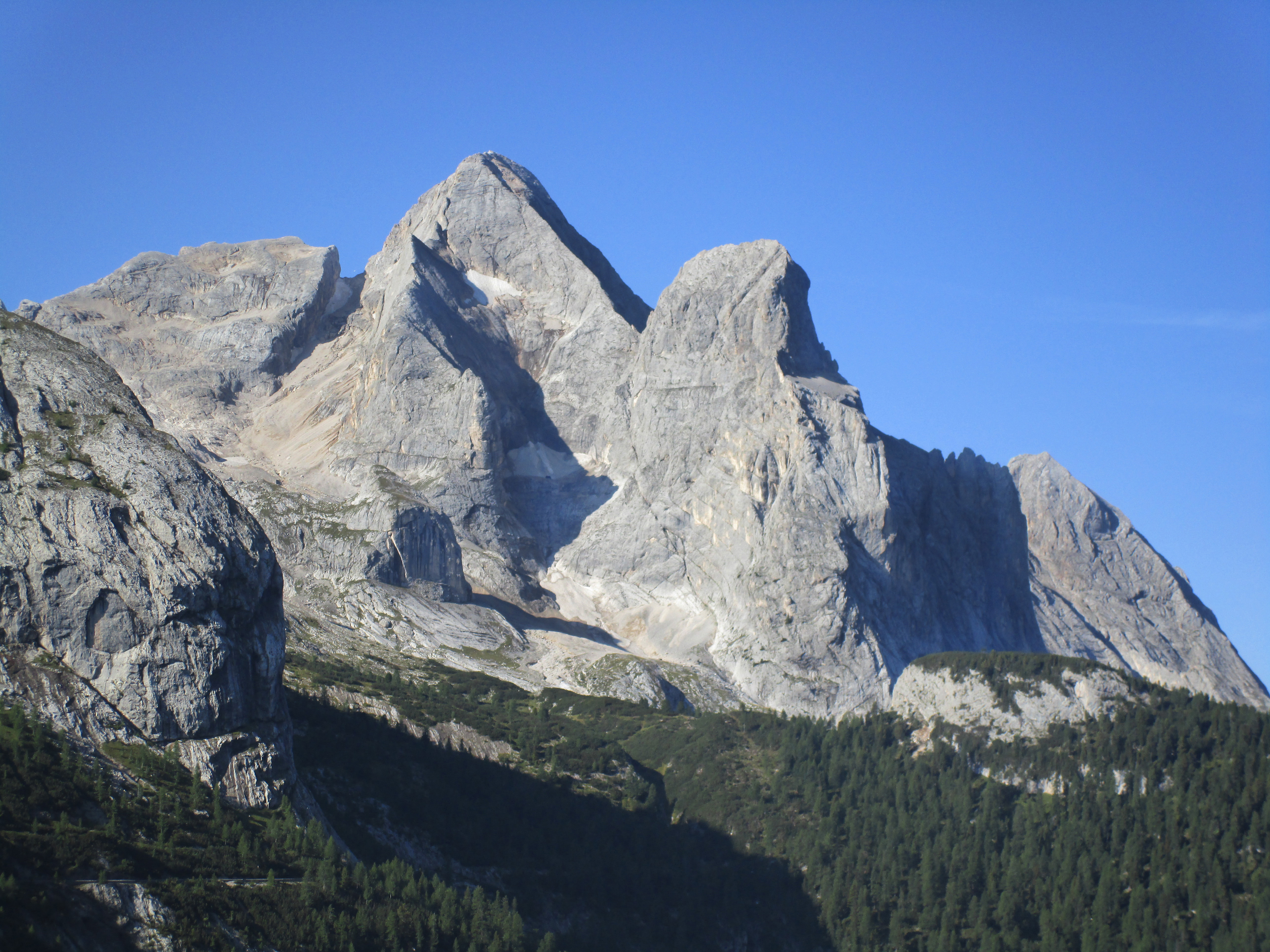
Northeast aspect

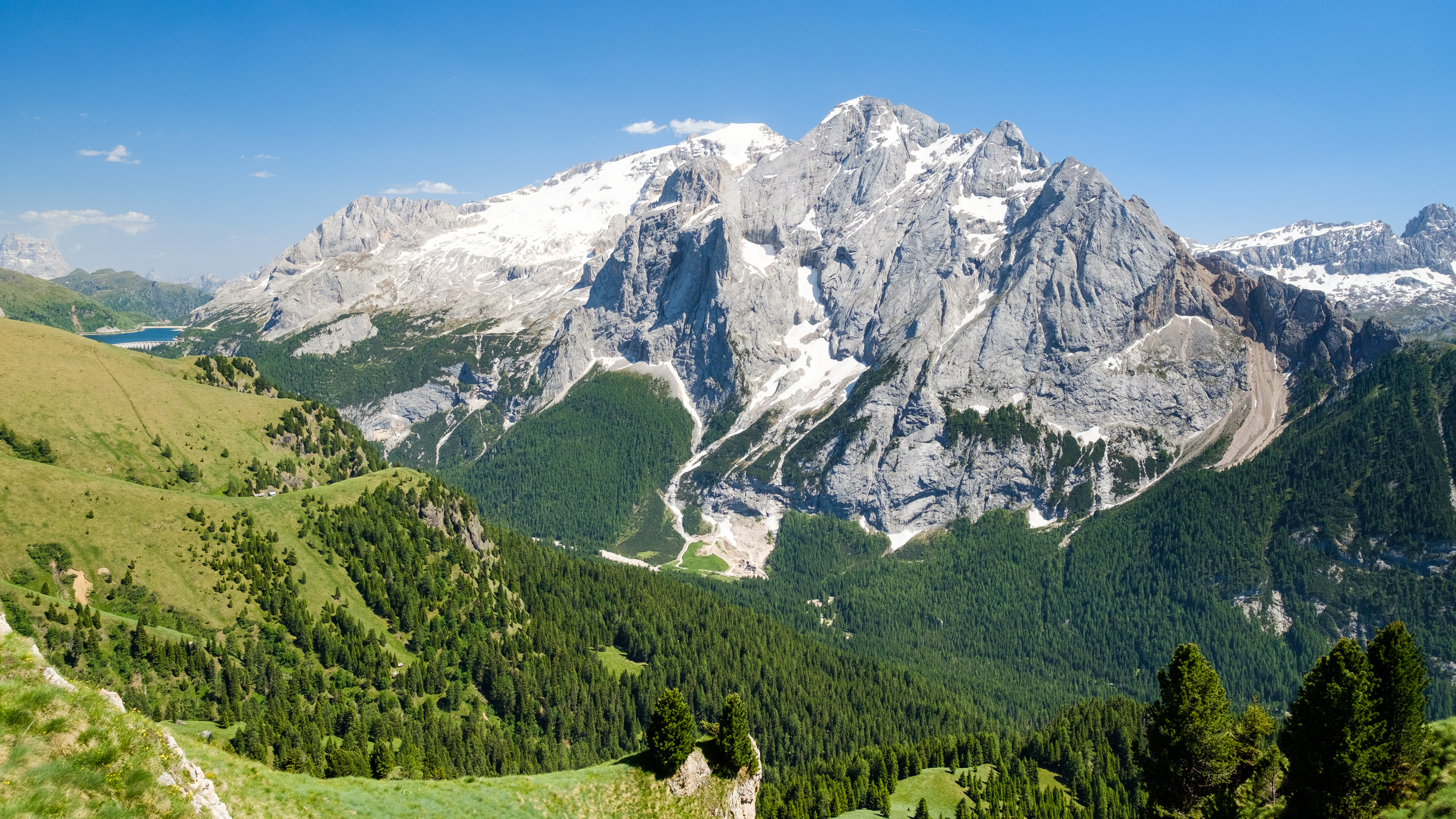
Gran Vernel with Marmolada behind

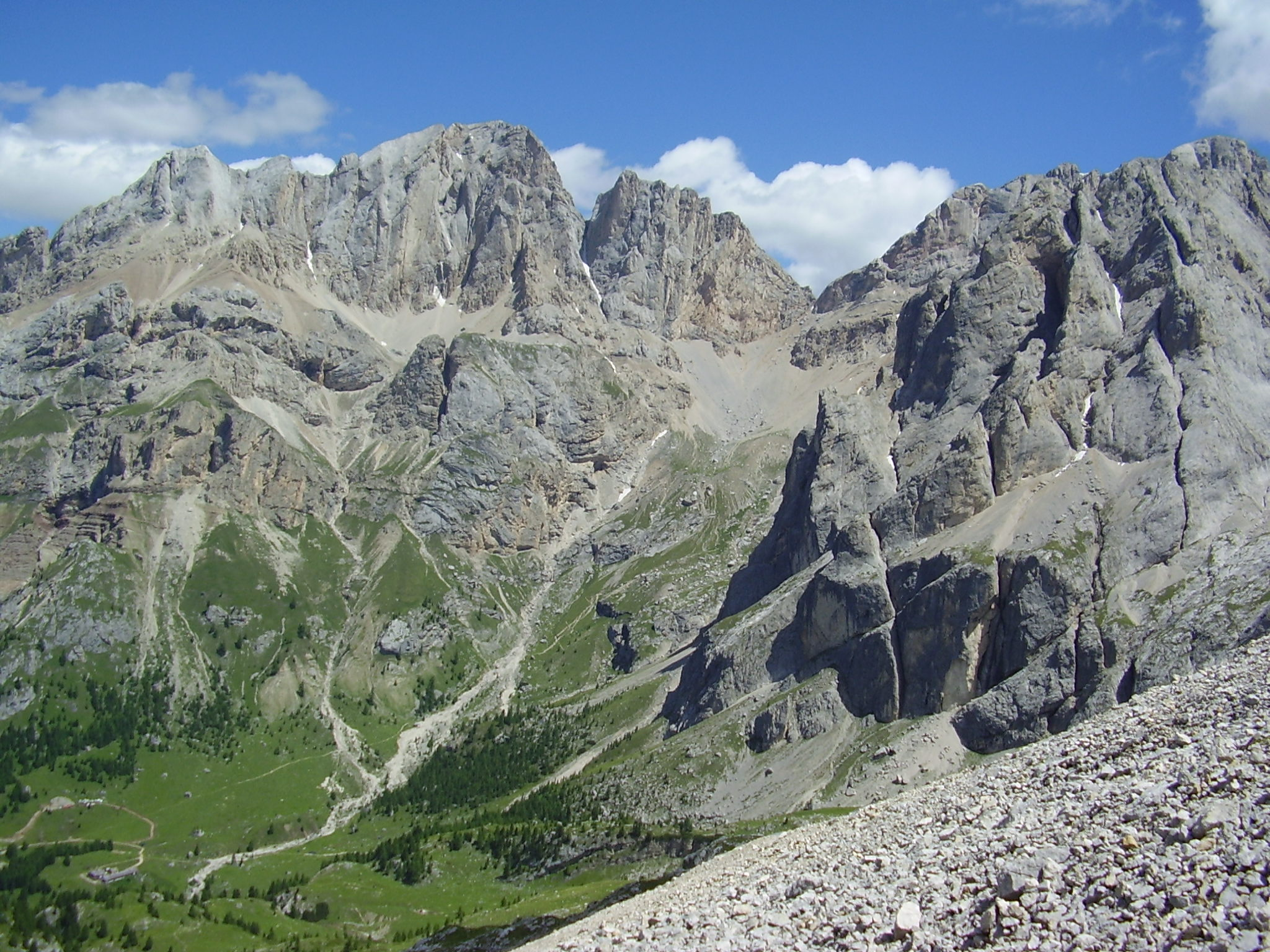
South face, to left

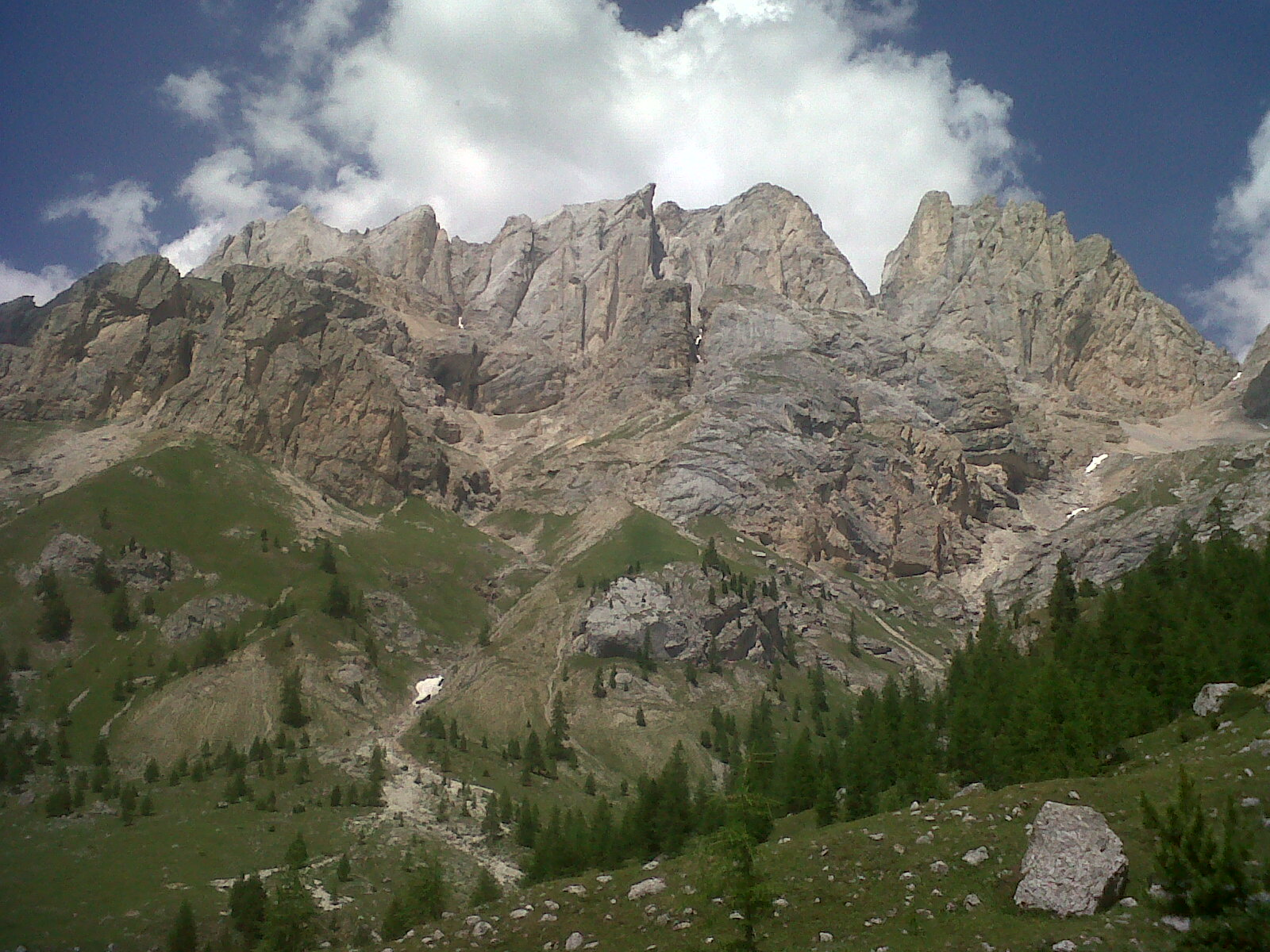
South face

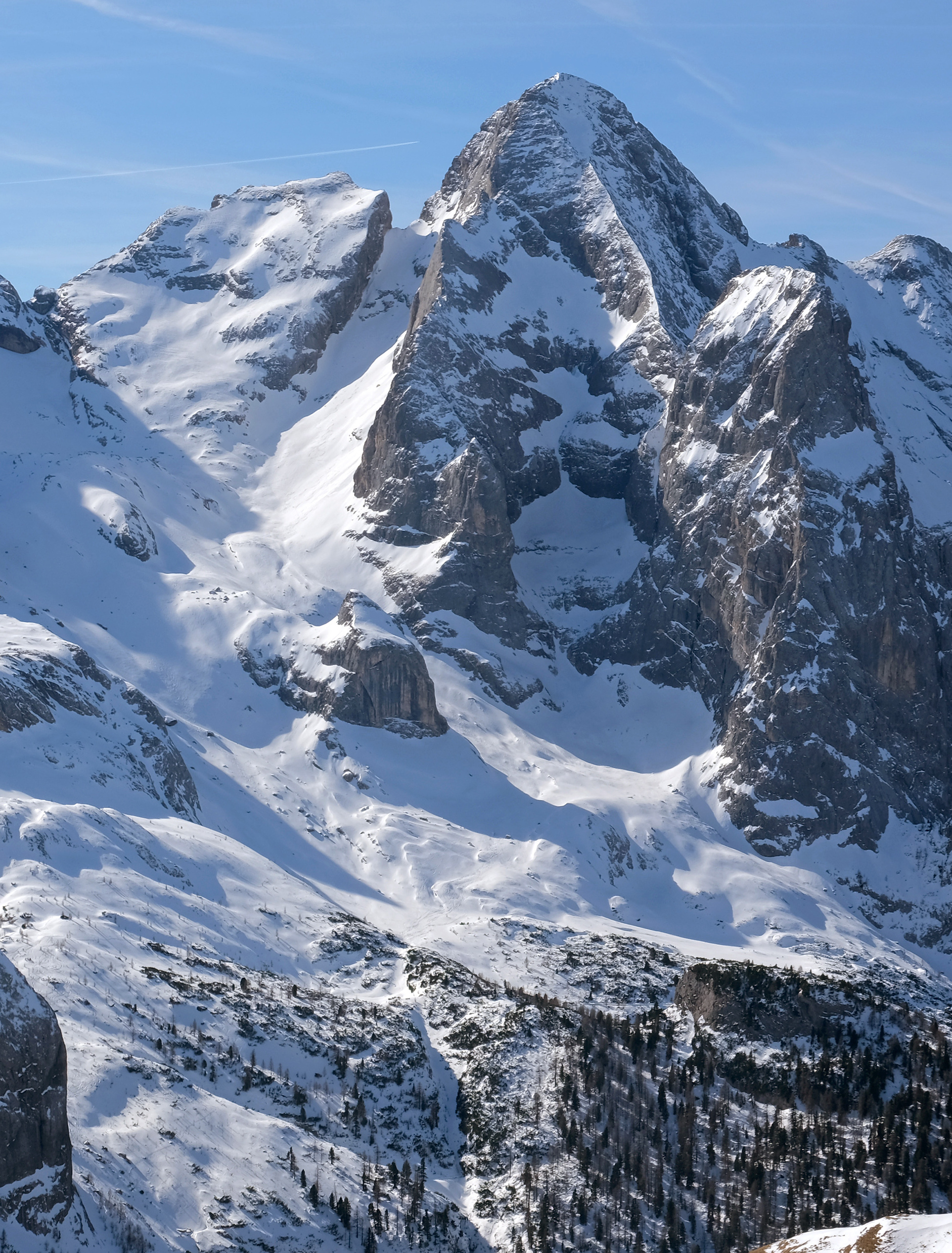
Northeast aspect

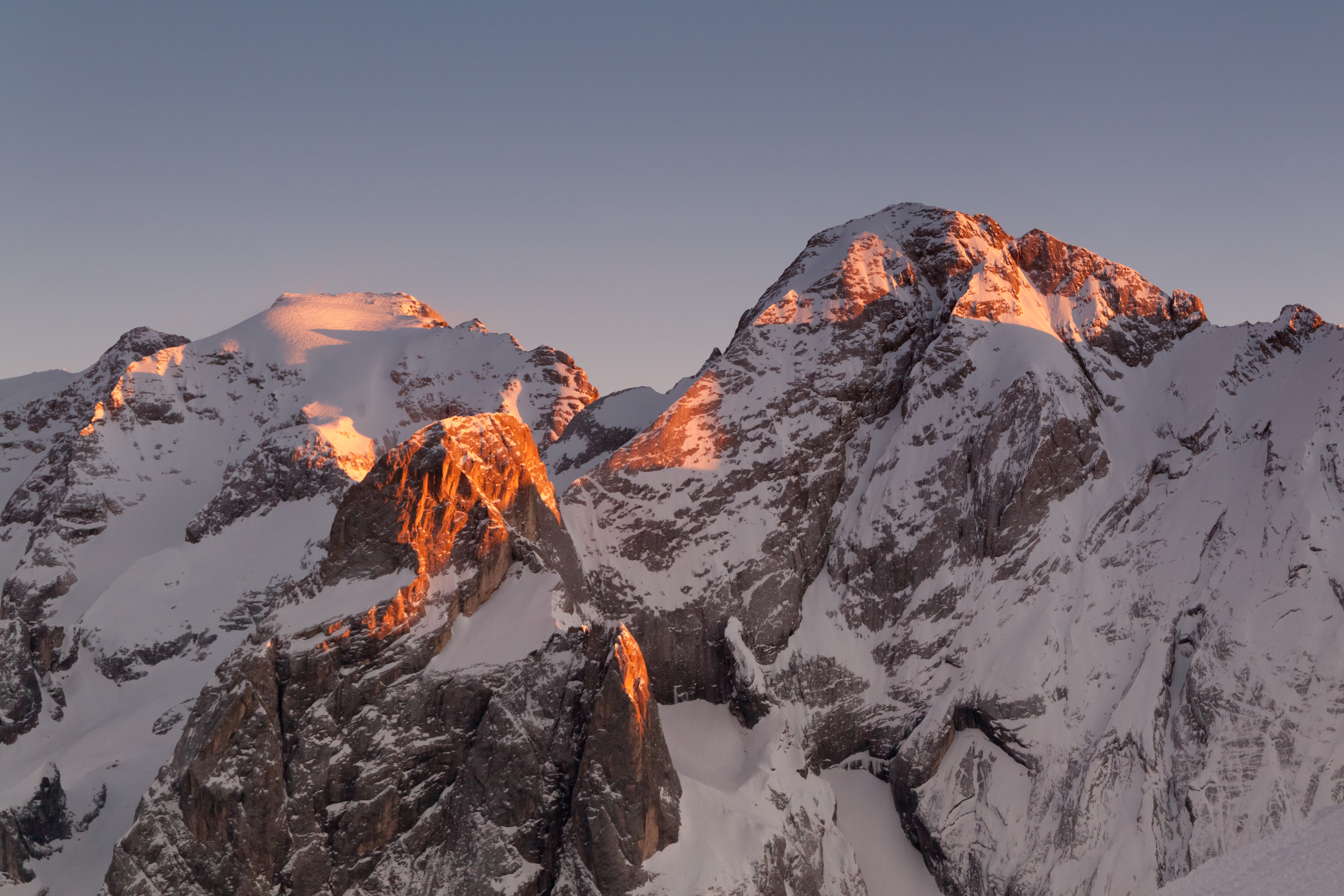
Marmolada (left) and Gran Vernel on the right

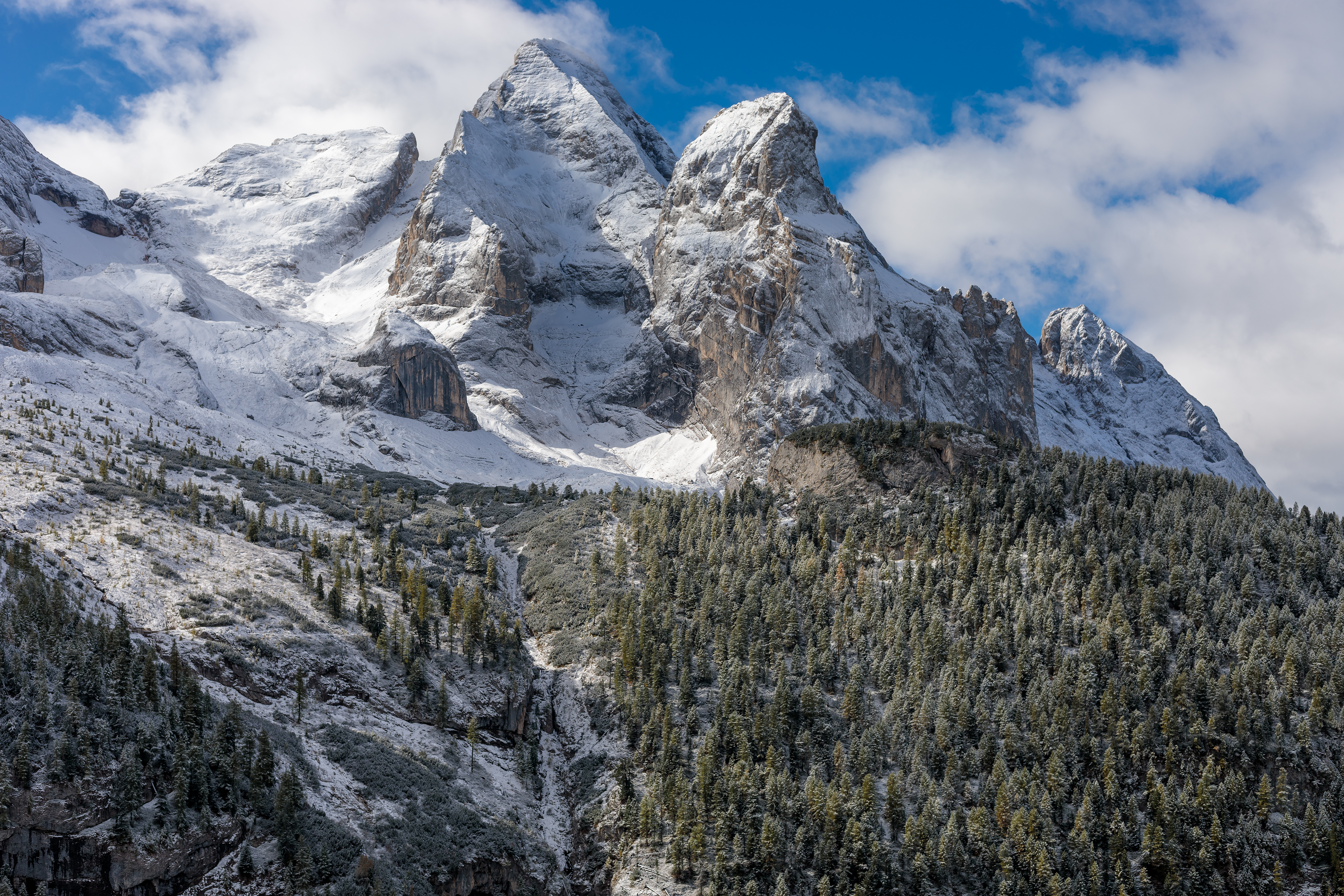

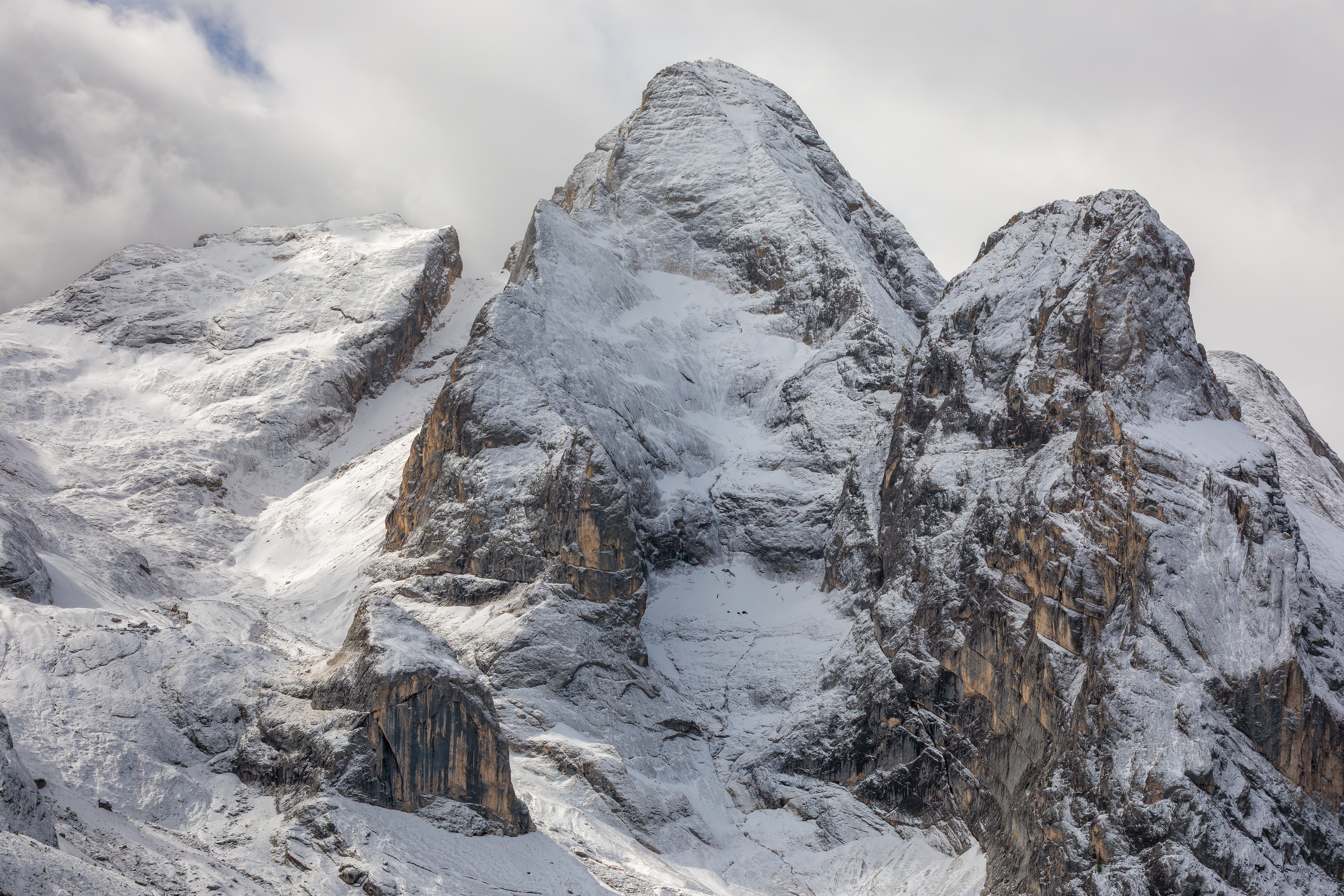

== See also ==
- Southern Limestone Alps
