= Mike Vernal =

American venture capitalist

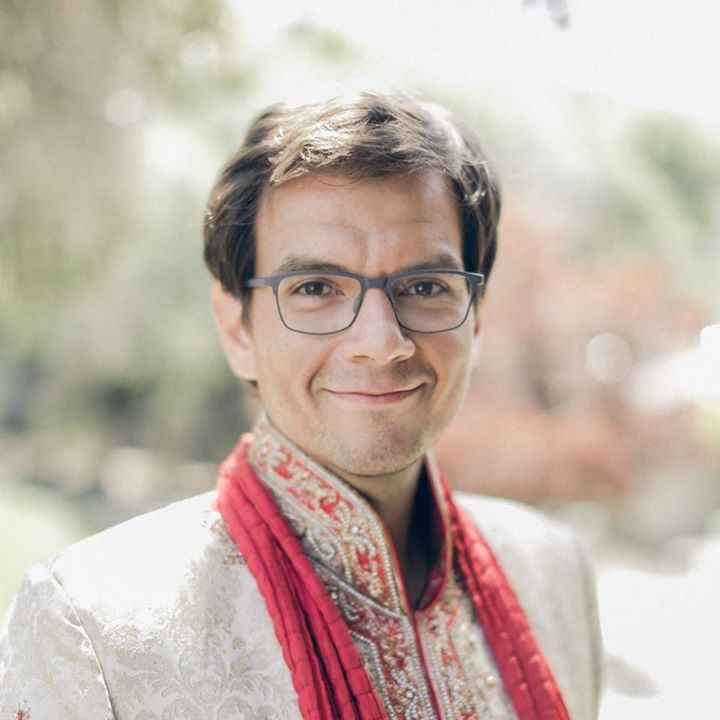
- Born: September 7, 1980 (age 46)
- Education: Harvard University, AB magna cum laude and SM, Computer Science, 2002
- Occupations: Business executive Venture capitalist

Mike Vernal (born September 7, 1980) is an American business executive and venture capitalist. He is a general partner at Conviction Partners, with Sarah Guo. He was previously a general partner at Sequoia Capital in Silicon Valley, and was Vice President of Search, Local, and Developer products at Facebook between 2008 and 2016.

== Career ==
Vernal joined Facebook in 2008. From 2009 to 2013, Vernal managed the Facebook Platform team and is credited with managing the Facebook Platform transition from desktop to mobile.

During his time at Facebook, he served as vice president and was considered among the “top executives” who ran the company.

In 2016, after eight years at Facebook, Vernal announced his plans to leave the company. In May 2016, he joined Sequoia Capital, a venture-capital firm specializing in technology startups. He is an early investor in Rippling, Clay, Notion, Rockset (acquired by OpenAI) and Statsig (acquired by OpenAI). In July 2023, The Information reported that Vernal was departing Sequoia.

At Conviction, he has led investments in Listen Labs (acquired by Salesforce), Instinct, OpenEvidence and Thinking Machines Lab.
