= 2022 Marmolada serac collapse =

Serac collapse in Italy

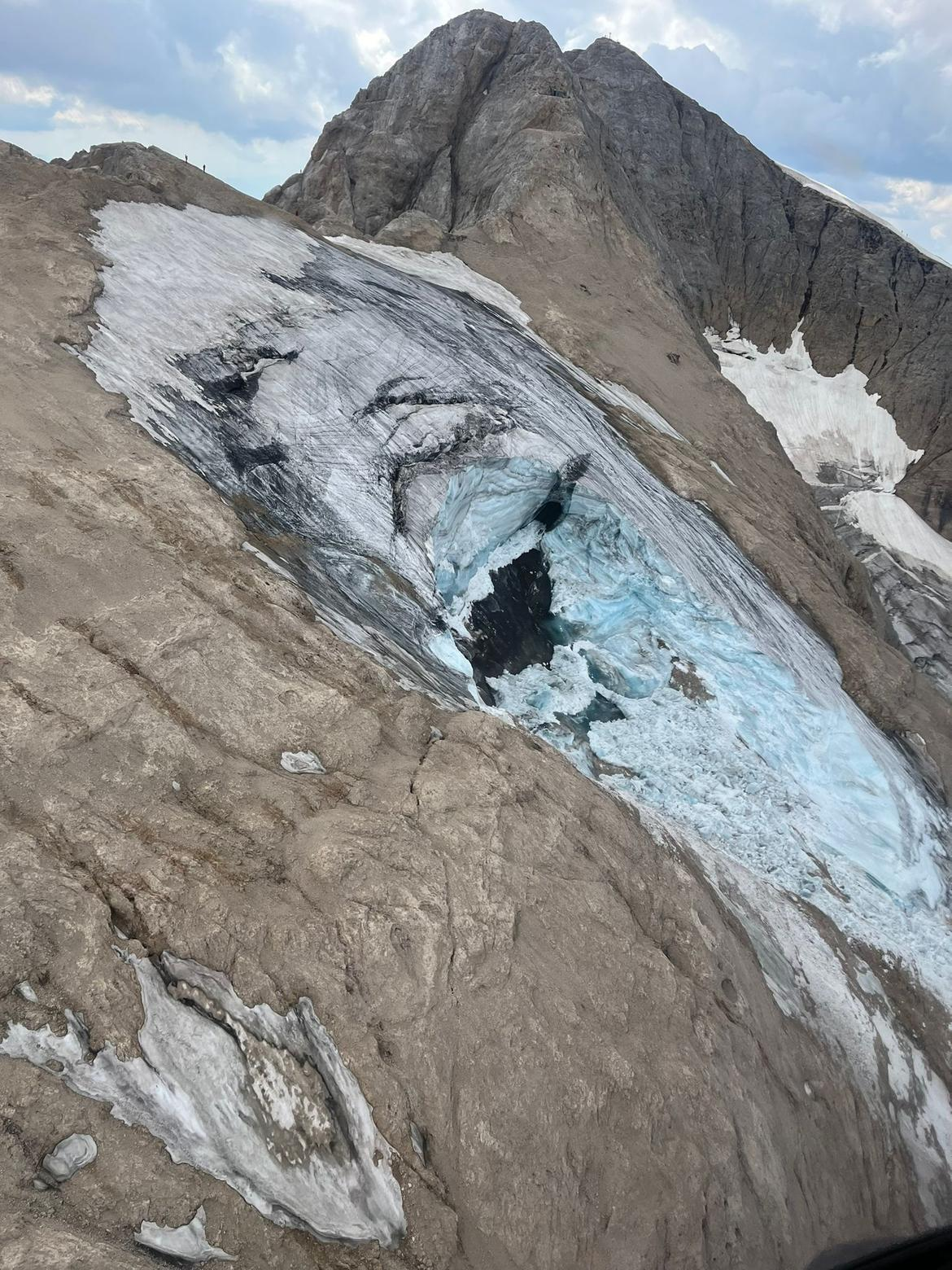
- Date: 3 July 2022
- Location: Marmolada, Italy
- Cause: Serac collapse
- Deaths: 11
- Injuries: 8

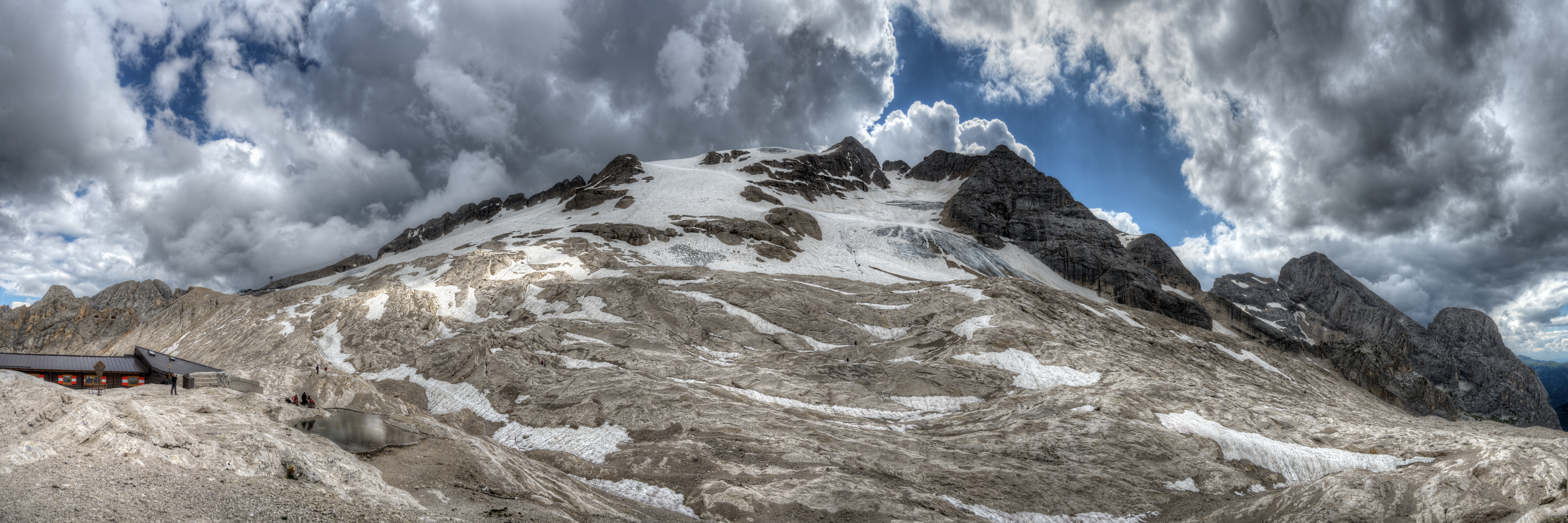
The glacier Ghiacciaio della Marmolada in 2013, Punta Rocca glacier with crack

On 3 July 2022, a serac collapsed on the mountain of Marmolada, in the Dolomites at the regional border between Trentino and Veneto, Italy. Eleven people were killed and eight were wounded. The large-scale collapse of the serac led to one of the most serious accidents in the Alps in decades. The seismic energy released was comparable to an M 0.6 earthquake.

== Background ==
Prior to the collapse the area had seen an early heat wave, with the summit of the Marmolada recording abnormally high temperatures of around 10 °C (50 °F). The collapse occurred near Punta Rocca at a height of 3,309 metres (10,856 ft), on a route utilized by climbers to reach the top peak.

== Description ==
On the afternoon of Sunday 3 July, around 13:45, a massive avalanche was triggered by a serac that collapsed due to the high temperatures, which reached 10 °C the day before the tragedy. At an elevation of 2800 metres, the lower end of a glacier snapped off. The break-off had a width of about 80 metres and a height of 25 metres. The detached volume was estimated to be 65000±10000 m^{3}. The seismic energy released was comparable to an M 0.6 earthquake.

The ice and rock masses fell several hundred metres down the northern slope onto the hiking trail passing below to the summit and on to just before the Fedaia reservoir about 1.5 kilometres away. The hiking trail was heavily frequented due to the time in the early afternoon of a summer Sunday.

== Factors leading to the event ==
The mountain rescuers described the event as an extraordinary incident that could not be compared to a normal avalanche. According to initial assumptions, the extremely high temperatures of the previous days were a factor leading to the accident. On the summit of the mountain, 10 °C had been measured the day before the accident. In addition, much less precipitation than usual had fallen in the previous winter, so the glacier lacked an insulating layer of snow as protection against the sun and the high temperatures. Reinhold Messner saw the accident as a consequence of climate change: "In recent years, a lake has repeatedly emerged on the tongue of the glacier. And this year in the summer this lake has arisen again and then obviously – no one has seen it – through a hole this water flowed under the tongue and from all sides at these hot July days the water has come in under the glacier." Glaciologist Christoph Mayer also assumed that meltwater had penetrated the glacier and accumulated underneath it, ultimately serving as a lubricant. This was later confirmed in scientific publications.

In an initial assessment, glaciologist Georg Kaser also assumed the same.

Rescuers used thermal drones to search for possible survivors shortly after the collapse with survivors being flown off the mountainside by helicopters.

== Victims ==
At least five distinct rope teams were involved in the collapse, which killed eleven mountaineers and injured eight more. Nine of the victims (six men, including two mountain guides, and three women) were Italian (all but one hailing from Veneto), and two were Czech. Six bodies were recovered in the immediate aftermath of the collapse, a seventh on the following day, two more three days after the collapse, and a further two on the fourth day. The remains of the eleventh and final victim were identified through DNA testing on 9 July.

Name	Nationality	Age	Notes
Filippo Bari	Italy	27	From Malo. Formed a rope team organized by the Malo section of the Italian Alpine Club along with Dani, Zavatta, and survivor Riccardo Franchin.
Liliana Bertoldi	Italy	54	From Levico Terme. Formed a rope team with survivors Laura Sartori and Davide Carnielli.
Erica Campagnaro	Italy	45	From Tezze sul Brenta. Wife of Davide Miotti. Formed a rope team with Miotti, Piran, and Gallina.
Tommaso Carollo	Italy	48	From Thiene. Was climbing with his wife, Alessandra De Camilli, who survived.
Pavel Dana	Czech Republic	47	Was climbing with Ouda.
Paolo Dani	Italy	52	From Valdagno. Mountain guide. Formed a rope team with Bari, Zavatta, and survivor Riccardo Franchin.
Gianmarco Gallina	Italy	32	From Montebelluna. Formed a rope team with Miotti, Campagnaro, and his girlfriend, Emanuela Piran.
Davide Miotti	Italy	51	From Tezze sul Brenta. Mountain guide, husband of Erica Campagnaro; formed a rope team with Campagnaro, Gallina, and Piran.
Martin Ouda	Czech Republic	48	Was climbing with Dana.
Emanuela Piran	Italy	33	From Bassano del Grappa. Formed a rope team with Miotti, Campagnaro, and her boyfriend, Gianmarco Gallina.
Nicolò Zavatta	Italy	22	From Barbarano Mossano. Formed a rope team with Bari, Dani, and survivor Riccardo Franchin.

Eight injured mountaineers, six Italians and two Germans, were rescued at the site of the disaster and hospitalized in Trento (a 27-year-old Italian man, a 29-year-old Italian woman, a 33-year-old Italian man and a 51-year-old Italian woman), Treviso (a 30-year-old Italian man), Feltre (a 67-year-old German man), Belluno (a 58-year-old German woman) and Cavalese, two of whom were in critical condition.

== Aftermath ==
Veneto regional governor Luca Zaia, reported that the Alpine rescue unit shared an emergency number for people to call if their loved ones had not returned from excursions on the mountain.

The day after the accident, Italian Prime Minister Mario Draghi visited the town of Canazei, where the rescue forces' operations centre was located. President Sergio Mattarella and other senior politicians expressed their condolences, and Pope Francis responded with a call to "find new ways conscious of humanity and nature" in the face of climate change.

== See also ==
- Marmolada Glacier
- Weather of 2022
- White Friday (1916)
- List of mountaineering disasters by death toll
