= Serac =

Large block or column of glacial ice

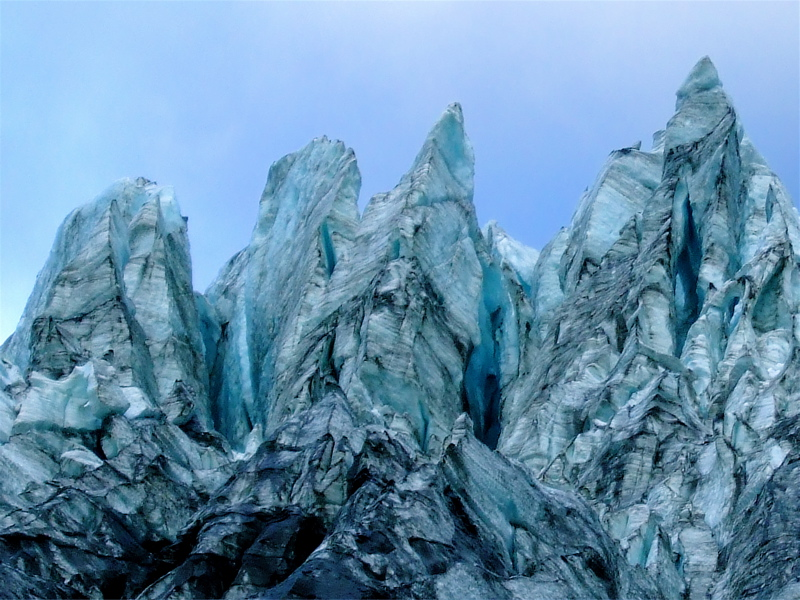
Fox Glacier, New Zealand

A serac (/səˈræk, ˈsɛræk/; from Swiss French sérac [seʁak], a type of cheese) is a block or column of glacial ice, often formed by intersecting crevasses on a glacier. Commonly house-sized or larger, they are dangerous to mountaineers and alpinists, since they may topple with little warning. Even if stabilized by persistent cold weather, they can be an impediment to glacier travel.

Seracs are found within an icefall, often in large numbers, or on ice faces on the lower edge of a hanging glacier. Notable examples of the overhanging glacier edge type are well-known obstacles on some of the world's highest mountains, including K2 at "The Bottleneck" and Kanchenjunga on the border of India and Nepal. Significant seracs in the Alps are found on the northeast face of Piz Roseg, the north face of the Dent d'Hérens, and the north face of Lyskamm.

== Mountaineering incidents ==
- On a 1969–1970 Japanese expedition to Mount Everest, Kyak Tsering was killed by a falling serac.
- In 1990, an earthquake caused a block of serac to fall off Lenin Peak, triggering an avalanche which hit a camp, killing 43 people.
- In the August 2008 K2 disaster, the collapse of large seracs was responsible for at least 8 of the 11 mountaineers' deaths.
- The April 2014 Mount Everest ice avalanche responsible for the deaths of 16 climbers was caused when a large serac broke off.
- In October 2018, nine climbers from South Korea were killed at Mount Gurja basecamp in Nepal from a gust of wind, driven by falling seracs and snow.
- On 3 July 2022, a serac collapse on the Marmolada Glacier in Italy killed eleven people and injured eight others.
- On April 12, 2023 three Sherpas died from a collapse of a serac in the Khumbu Icefall section of the South Col route of Mt. Everest.

== Gallery ==
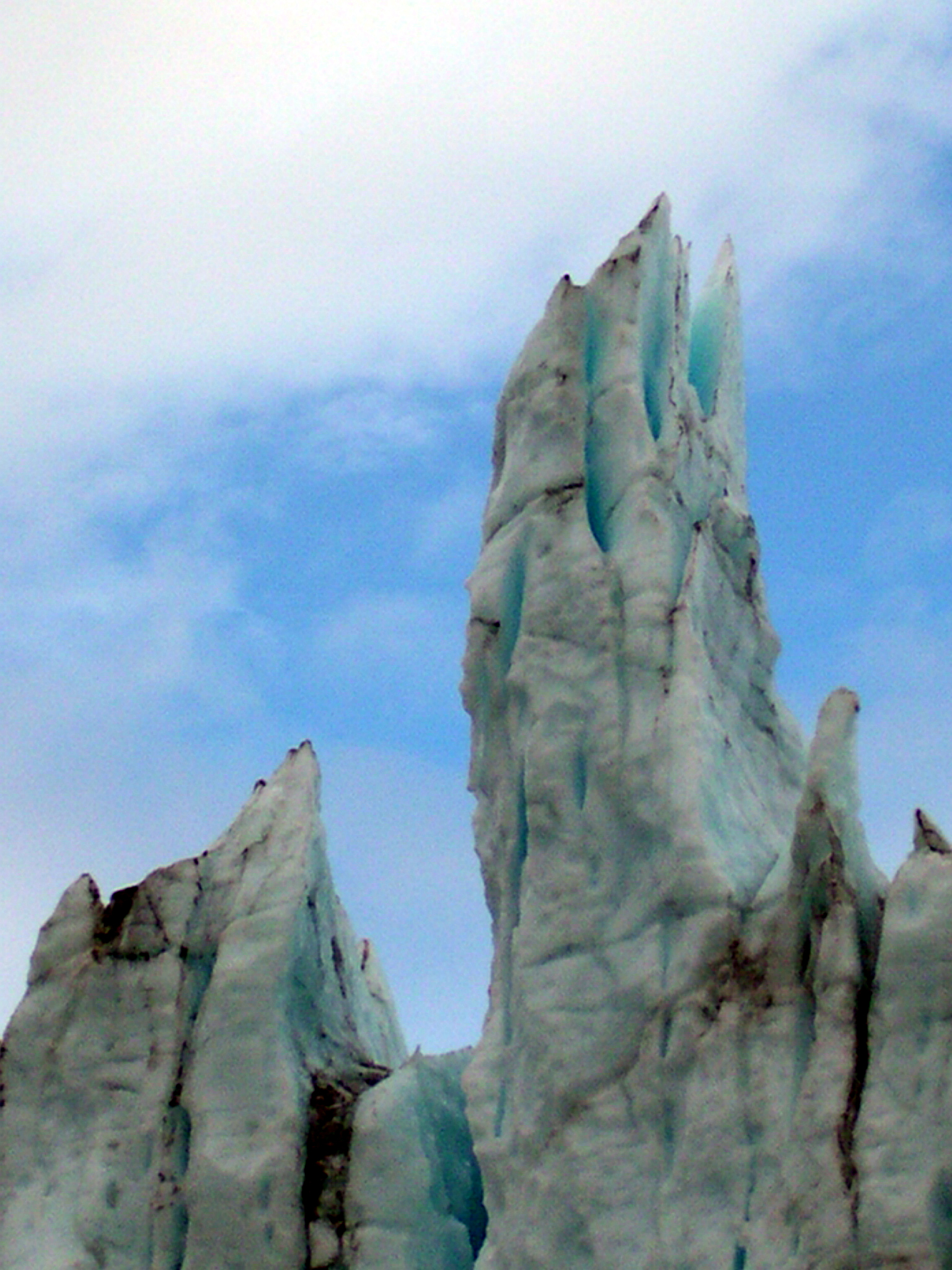
Serac, Russell Glacier in Greenland

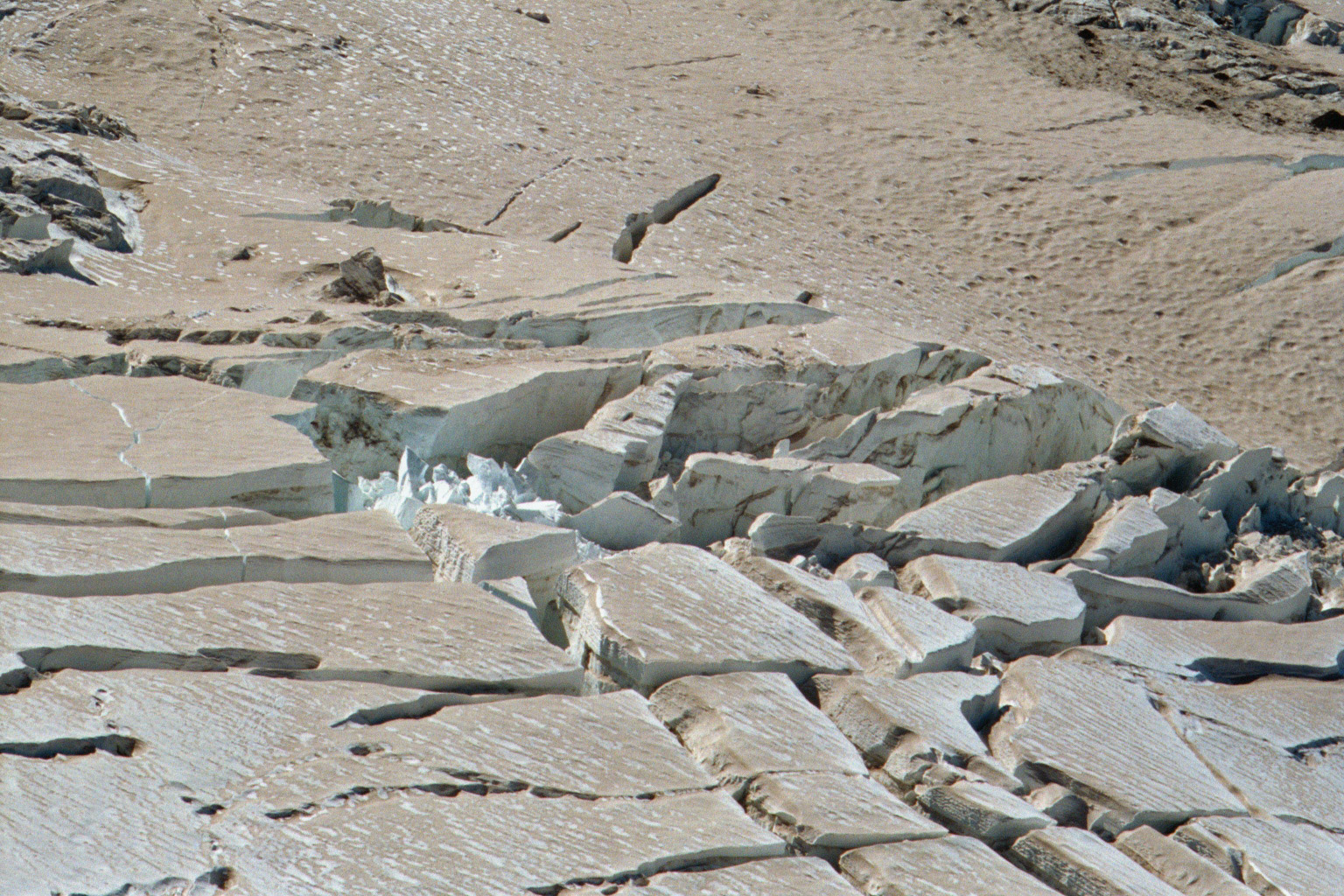
Seracs in firn at 3,050 metres (10,000 feet) on the Winthrop Glacier of Mount Rainier in Washington, USA

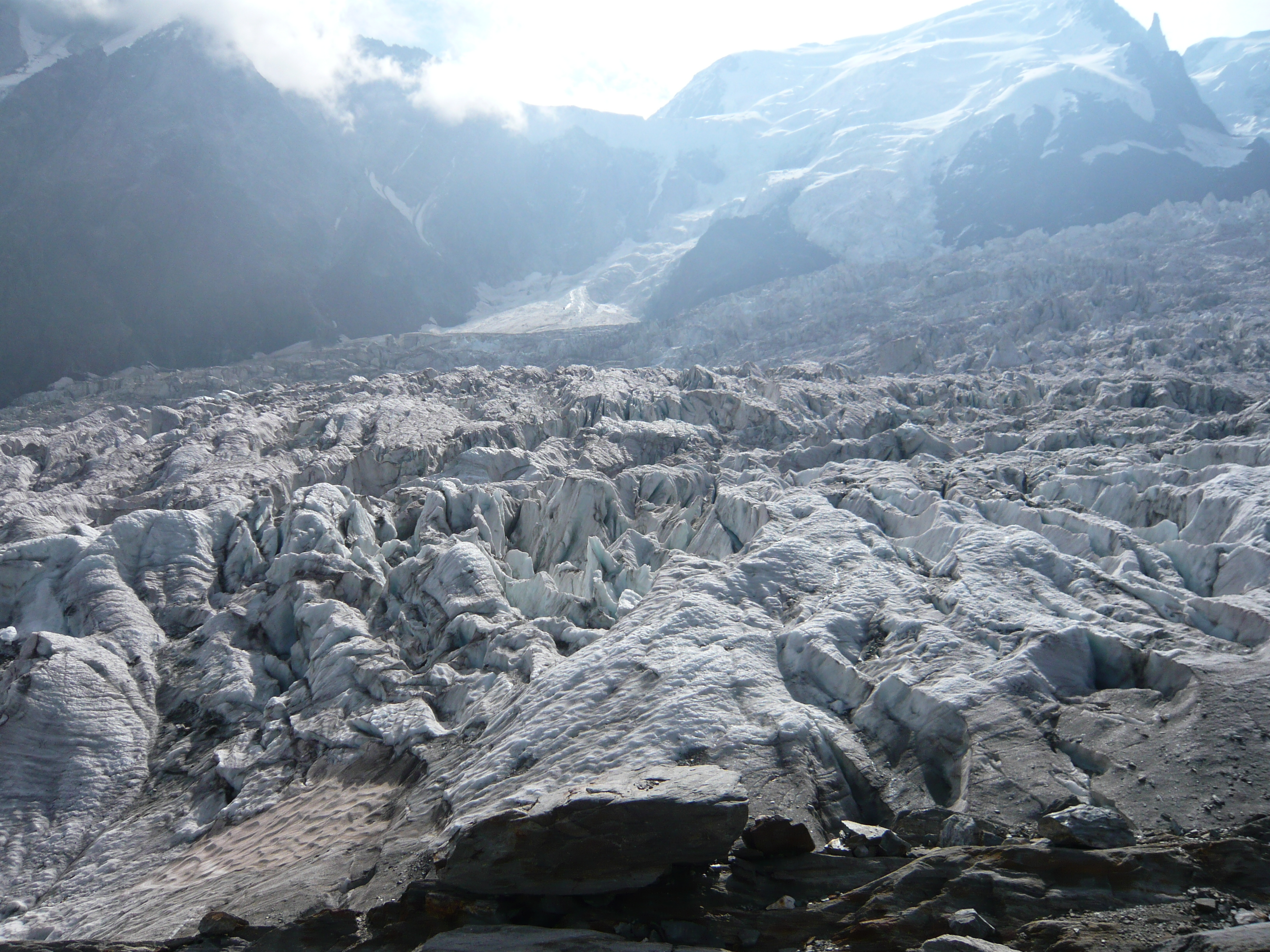
Seracs, Bossons Glacier, southeastern France

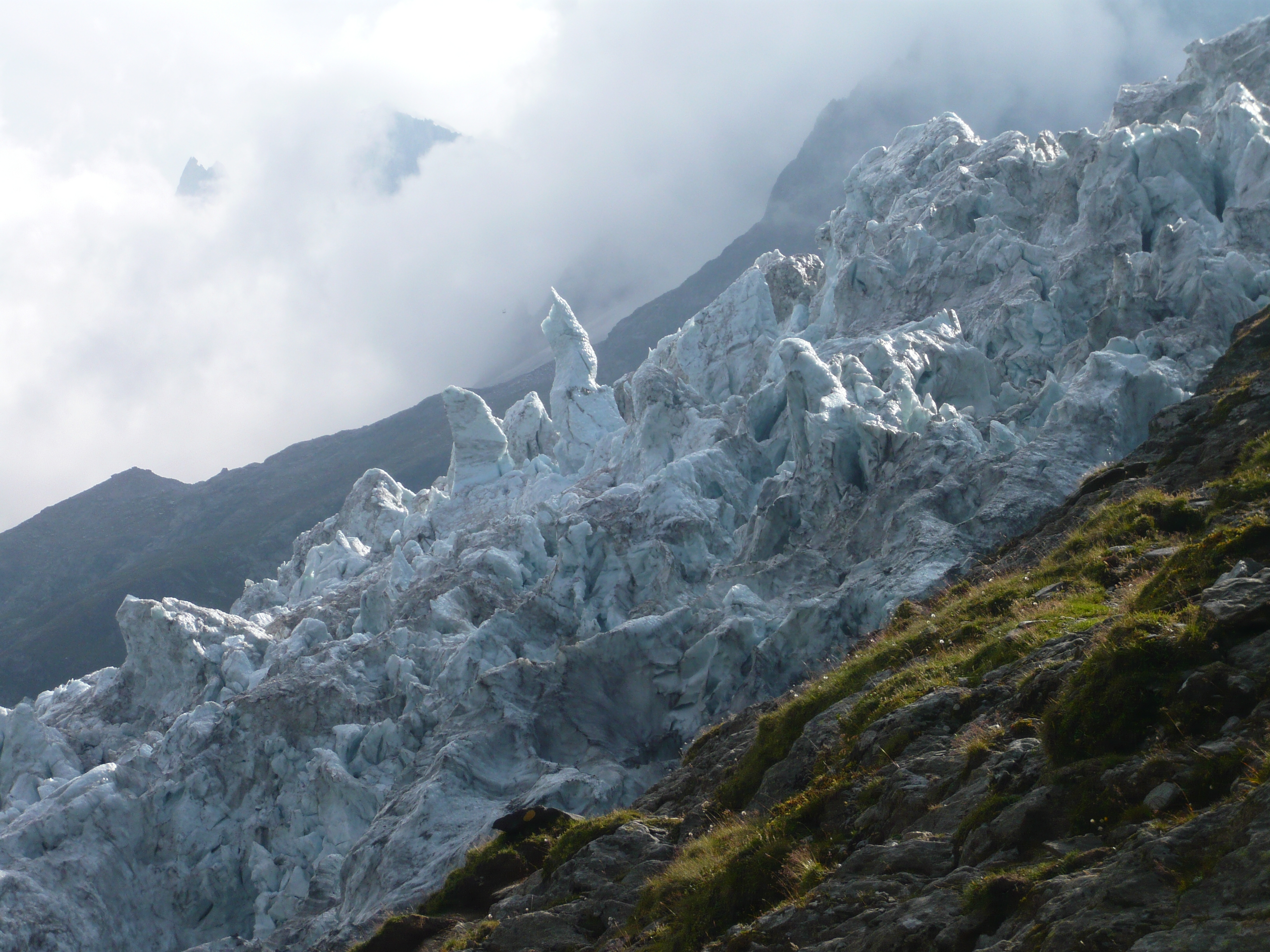
Seracs, Bossons Glacier

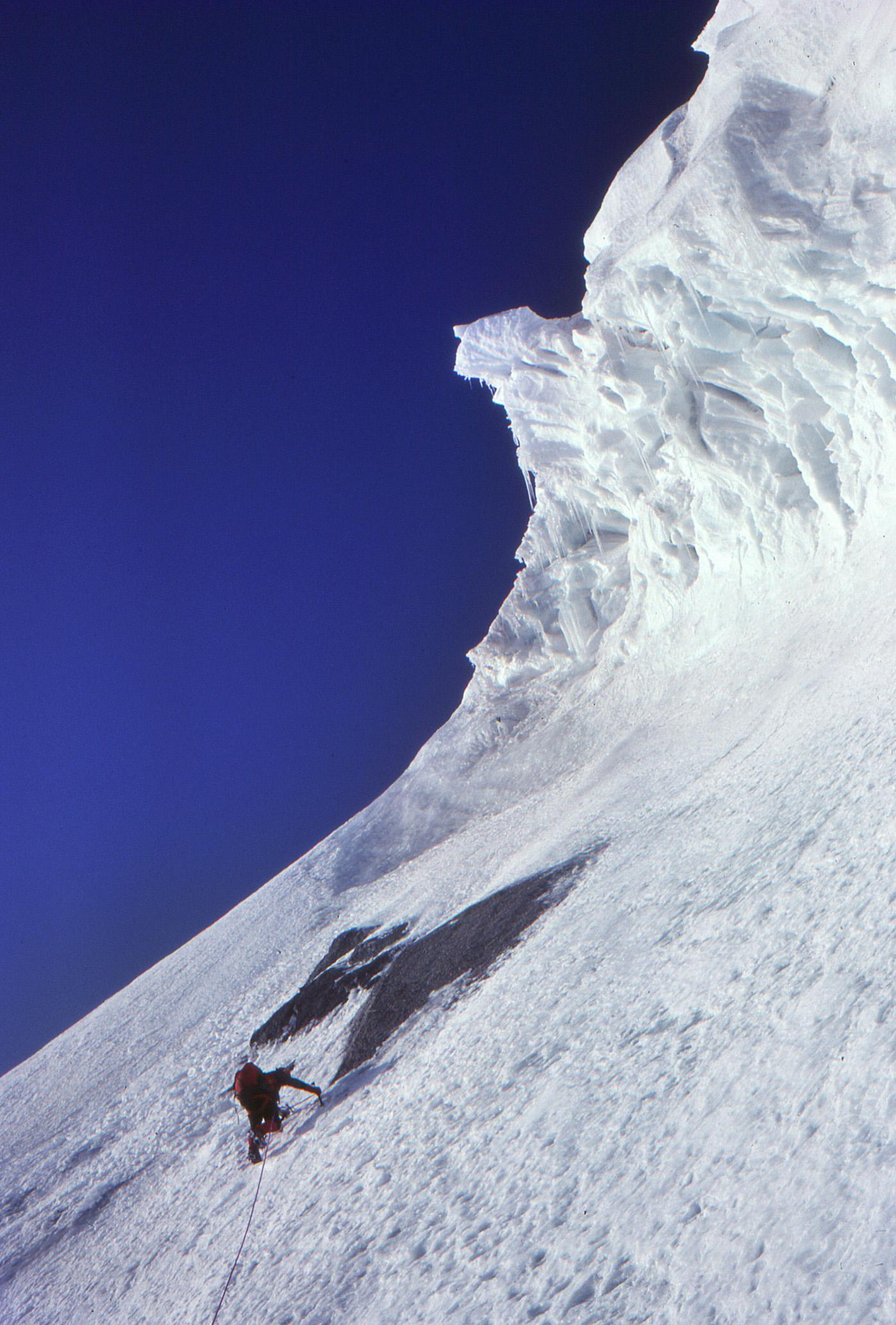
Alpinist crossing a snow field underneath a hanging serac on the Grand Pilier d'Angle

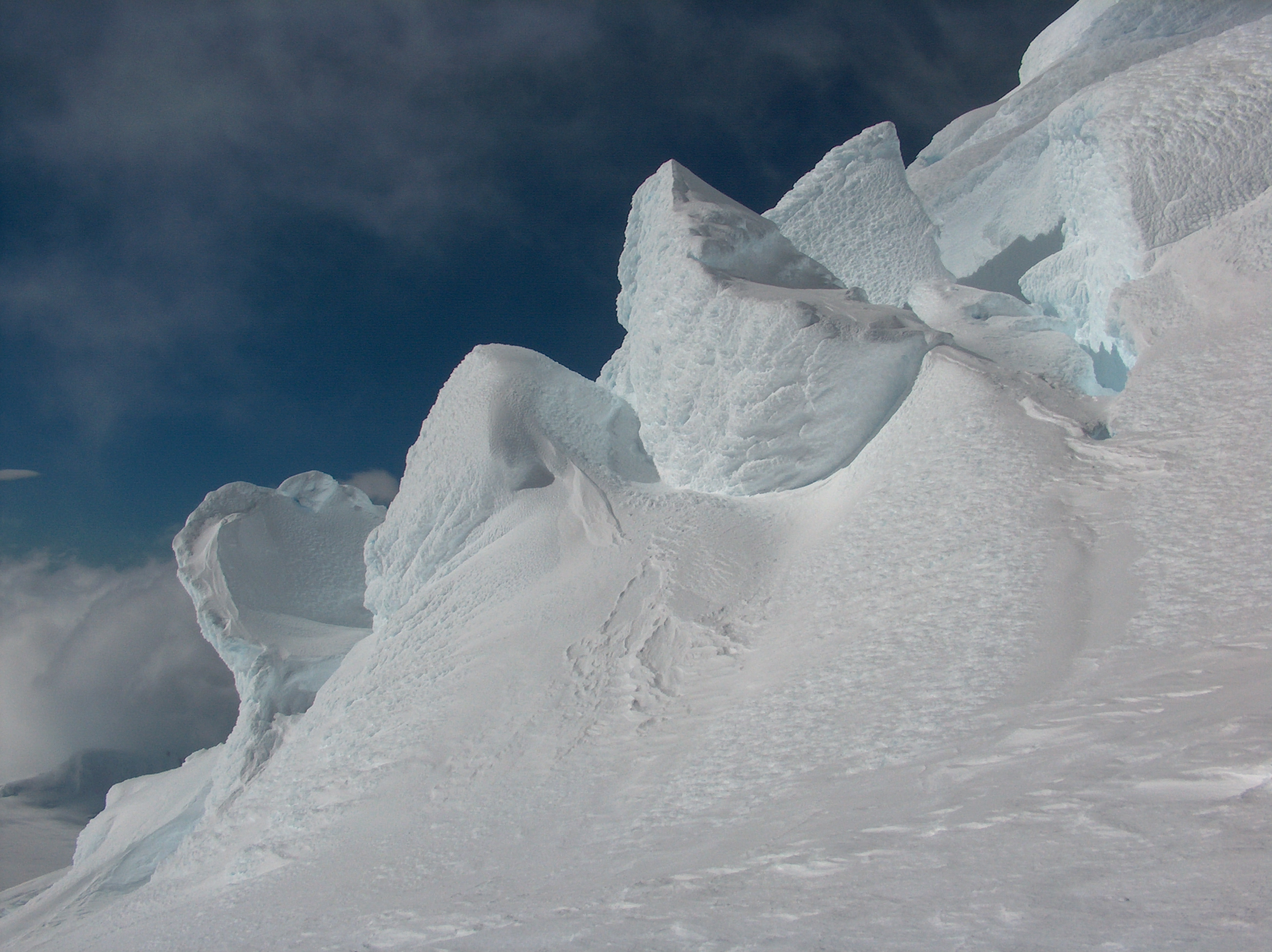
Seracs at Catalunyan Saddle in Tangra Mountains, Livingston Island in Antarctica

== See also ==
- Alpine climbing
- Penitente (snow formation)
- Ice calving
