= Fedaia Pass =

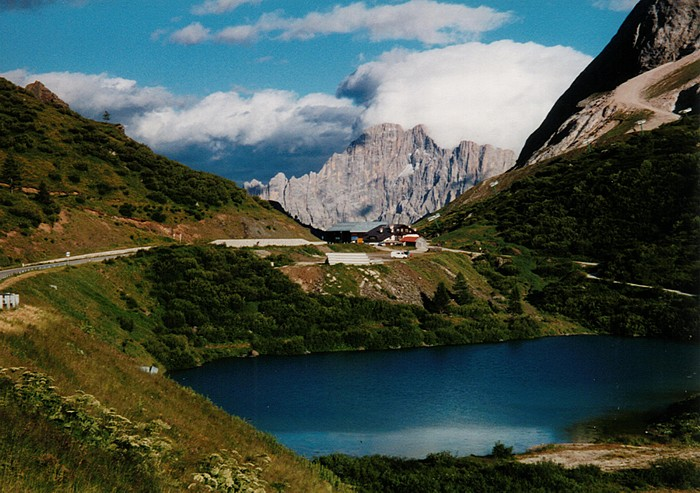
- Fedaia Pass with Monte Civetta in the background.

- Location within Alps
- Elevation: 2,057 metres (6,749 ft)
- Traversed by: Strada Statale 641 del Fedaia Pass

Third Approach
- Location: Italy
- Range: Dolomites
- Coordinates: 46°27′13″N 11°53′20″E

The Fedaia Pass is a mountain pass traversed by a paved road in the Dolomiti Range in Northern Italy. It lies at the northern base of the Marmolada, the highest peak in the region and the Dolomiti. It is known for its beauty, for Lago Fedaia, and for its use in the Giro d'Italia. It was also used as a location for the 2003 film Italian Job. It is the site of the Fedaia Pass and Marmolada Gletscher ski areas.

== Climate ==
Climate data for Fedaia Pass, elevation 2,040 m (6,690 ft), (1981–2010)
Month	Jan	Feb	Mar	Apr	May	Jun	Jul	Aug	Sep	Oct	Nov	Dec	Year
Mean daily maximum °C (°F)	−2.2 (28.0)	−0.9 (30.4)	1.3 (34.3)	3.7 (38.7)	8.6 (47.5)	12.4 (54.3)	15.7 (60.3)	15.4 (59.7)	12.1 (53.8)	7.9 (46.2)	1.9 (35.4)	−1.7 (28.9)	6.2 (43.1)
Daily mean °C (°F)	−5.3 (22.5)	−4.9 (23.2)	−2.4 (27.7)	0.3 (32.5)	5.4 (41.7)	8.9 (48.0)	11.5 (52.7)	11.2 (52.2)	7.7 (45.9)	4.2 (39.6)	−1.3 (29.7)	−5.1 (22.8)	2.5 (36.5)
Mean daily minimum °C (°F)	−9.1 (15.6)	−9.5 (14.9)	−7.3 (18.9)	−4.0 (24.8)	0.7 (33.3)	4.0 (39.2)	6.3 (43.3)	6.2 (43.2)	3.1 (37.6)	−0.1 (31.8)	−4.9 (23.2)	−8.2 (17.2)	−1.9 (28.6)
Source: Istituto Superiore per la Protezione e la Ricerca Ambientale

== See also ==
- List of highest paved roads in Europe
- List of mountain passes
