= Bilby, Nottinghamshire =

Coordinates: 53.34°N 1.05°W

Bilby
- Location within Nottinghamshire
- OS grid reference: SK636830
- Civil parish: Barnby Moor
- District: Bassetlaw
- Shire county: Nottinghamshire
- Region: East Midlands
- Country: England
- Sovereign state: United Kingdom
- Post town: RETFORD
- Postcode district: DN22
- Dialling code: 01777
- Police: Nottinghamshire
- Fire: Nottinghamshire
- Ambulance: East Midlands

Bilby is a hamlet in Nottinghamshire, England. It is in the detached part of the civil parish of Barnby Moor. It is located 5 miles west of Retford, close to the A1 road. Bilby was recorded in the Domesday Book as Billebi.
