= Listed buildings in Barnby Moor =

Barnby Moor is a civil parish in the Bassetlaw District of Nottinghamshire, England. The parish contains three listed buildings that are recorded in the National Heritage List for England. All the listed buildings are designated at Grade II, the lowest of the three grades, which is applied to "buildings of national importance and special interest". The parish contains the village of Barnby Moor and the surrounding area. All the listed buildings are near the centre of the village, and consist of two houses and a public house.

== Buildings ==
Name and location	Photograph	Date	Notes
The White Horse Inn; 53.35238°N 1.00409°W		Mid 18th century	The public house is rendered, and has dogtooth eaves and a pantile roof. There are two storeys and five bays, the left three bays slightly receding, and rear extensions. Above the doorway in the right bay is a canopy on brackets. The windows are sashes in architraves, the upper window in the middle bay being horizontally-sliding.
Reindeer House; 53.35235°N 1.00538°W	—	Late 18th century	A red brick house with a floor band, dentilled eaves and a hipped pantile roof. There are two storeys and five bays, and a two-storey five-bay rear wing. The central doorway has a traceried fanlight, and the windows are sashes with splayed lintels and keystones.
Barnby Moor Lodge; 53.35226°N 1.00564°W	—	Early 19th century	The house is in painted stuccoed brick on a plinth, with stone dressings, overhanging eaves, and a slate roof with a central gully in pantile. There are two storeys and four bays. The doorway has a plain surround and a traceried fanlight, and the windows are slightly bowed sashes. All the openings have splayed lintels and fluted keystones.
