= Beatrice Tomasson =

English mountaineer (1859–1947)

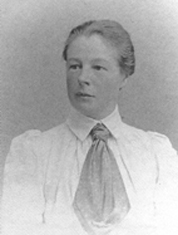
- Beatrice Tomasson in 1883

Personal information
- Nationality: English
- Born: 25 April 1859 Barnby Moor, Nottinghamshire
- Died: 13 February 1947 (aged 87) Sussex

Climbing career
- Type of climber: Mountaineer
- Known for: first ascent of the south face of the Marmolada in 1901

Beatrice Tomasson (25 April 1859 – 13 February 1947) was an English mountaineer. She climbed extensively in the Dolomites and made the first ascent of the south face of the Marmolada in 1901.

== Biography ==
=== Early life ===
Beatrice Tomasson was born in 1859 to William and Sarah Anne Tomasson, in Barnby Moor, Nottinghamshire; she was their second child. At ten years old, Tomasson and her family moved to Ireland. They lived in Gortnamona, a property near Tullamore, County Offaly.

In 1882, when she was 22 years old, Tomasson travelled to Potsdam, then part of Prussia, to work as a private tutor for the household of Prussian army General von Bülow. Unsuccessfully, she tried to translate and publish Felix Dahn's four-volume novel A Struggle for Rome from German to English. She and Cäcilie Wüstenburg later wrote and translated The Chimes of Erfurt: A Tale, which was published in 1885.

=== Mountaineering ===
Tomasson moved to Innsbruck in 1885 where she took up mountain climbing. From 1892, she worked as a governess for Edward Lisle Strutt, whom she accompanied on numerous expeditions to Tyrol, Ötztal, the Stubai Alps and the Karwendel range. Despite Tommason being 15 years older than Strutt the family believed they were romantically involved. Tomasson became a member of the Austrian Alpine Club in 1893 and began to attempt major climbs in the Dolomites from 1896 onwards.

Tomasson began climbing with Michele Bettega, a mountain guide, in 1897. Together, they made the first ascents of Cima d'Alberghetto, Torre del Giubileo, Campanile della Regina Vittoria, Monte Lastei d'Agner, and Sasso delle Capre. In 1898 she made the first ascent of the northeast face of Monte Zebrù, which was considered at the time to be the most difficult ice wall to climb in the Tyrol, as well as the first ascent of Ortler and the second ascent of the west face of Laurinswand, which was considered to be the Dolomites' most difficult rock wall. She and Luigi Rizzi were the first climbers to summit the Dent di Mesdi via the south face in 1900. In July 1901 Tomasson, Bettega and Bartolo Zagonel made the first ascent of the south face of the Marmolada, which is considered her greatest climbing achievement. The route had been considered "the longest and most difficult climb in the Alps" for more than a decade, yet Tomasson's team made the ascent in just one day.

For the duration of her mountaineering career, Tomasson worked as a governess for wealthy families in Innsbruck, London, Copenhagen, Graz, Cortina, Nottingham, and Brierley; this income allowed her to embark on so many guided climbing expeditions.

=== Retirement ===
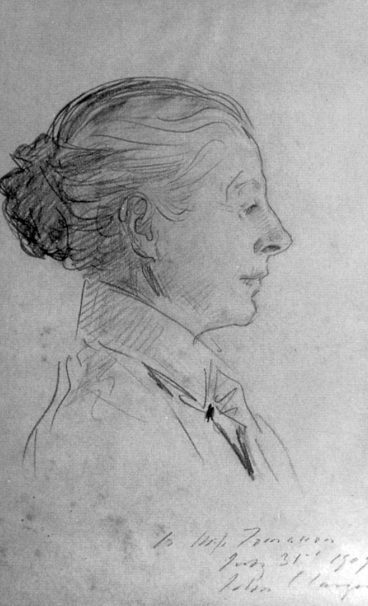
Beatrice Tomasson by John Singer Sargent

Tomasson's climbing career was essentially ended by the outbreak of World War I, at which time most of her guides were recruited for war. She returned to Britain in 1912 where she devoted her time to horse riding and hunting. She married Patrick Chalmers Mackenzie in 1921, when she was 61 years old, and they settled in his Sussex estate, where Tomasson died in 1947 at the age of 87.
