= Barnby Moor =

Civil parish in Nottinghamshire, England

Coordinates: 53.35°N 1.00°W

- Village and Civil parish
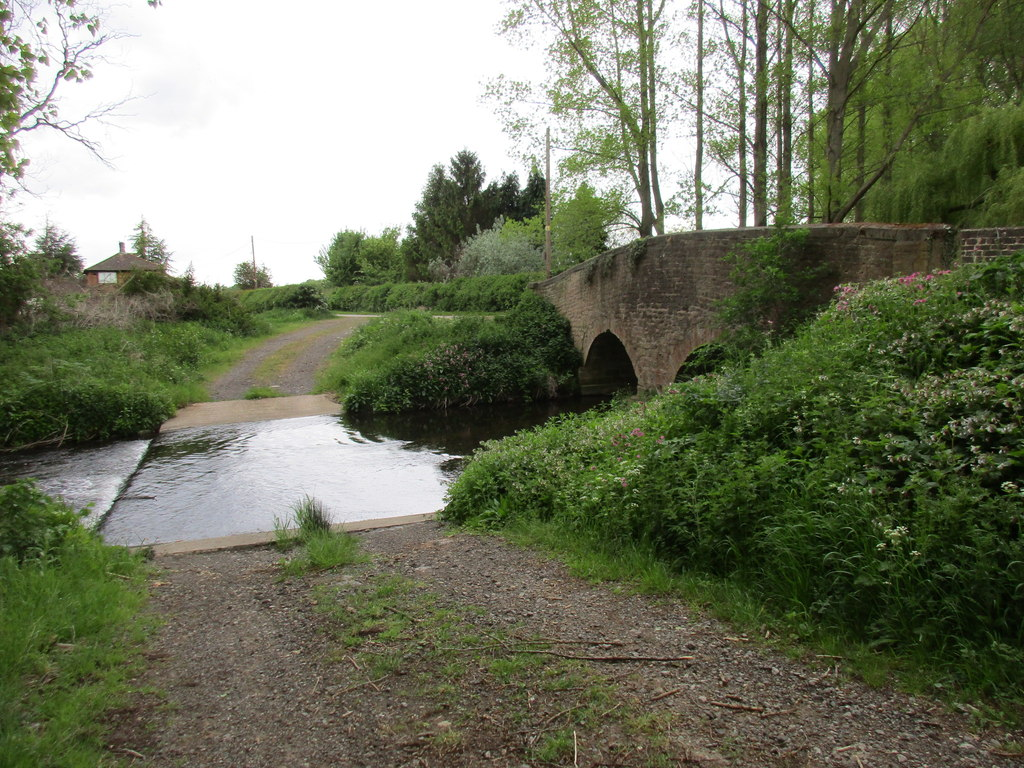
- Ford and bridge over the River Ryton at Bilby

- Location within Nottinghamshire
- Interactive map of Barnby Moor
- Area: 3.09 sq mi (8.0 km^{2})
- Population: 274 (2021)
  - Density: 89/sq mi (34/km^{2})
- OS grid reference: SK6684
  - London: 130 mi (210 km) SE
- District: Bassetlaw
- Shire county: Nottinghamshire
- Region: East Midlands
- Country: England
- Sovereign state: United Kingdom
- Settlements: Barnby Moor, Bilby
- Post town: RETFORD
- Postcode district: DN22
- Dialling code: 01777
- Police: Nottinghamshire
- Fire: Nottinghamshire
- Ambulance: East Midlands
- UK Parliament: Bassetlaw
- Website: Barnby Moor parish council

Barnby Moor is a village and civil parish in the Bassetlaw district of Nottinghamshire, England, with a population of 257 (2001 Census), increasing to the 2011 Census to 278, and dropping marginally to 274 in 2021. The village is about three miles north of Retford.

== Geography ==
The A638 passes through the village.

== Bilby exclave ==
The hamlet of Bilby is within the parish of Barnby Moor constituting a detached portion thereof due to being separated by narrow strips of Hodsock and Babworth. This means Barnby Moor is one of a very small number of civil parishes in England to still have a detached portion.

== History ==
In 1086 at the Domesday Survey, the village was known as Barnet-Juxta-Blidas, becoming over time Barneby Super Le Moor, Barnbie on the Moor, Barnebi and finally to Barnby Moor. The name is derived from the Norse ‘Beorn’, meaning a town and the suffix ‘by’, meaning a farm. The added ‘Moor’ was because to the land around being a combination of woods, moorland and fen. In the 13th century, a number of land-owners, including Wyot de Barneby and his heirs, bequeathed land and woods to the Benedictines of Blyth Priory, later this land was taken by Henry VIII at the Dissolution of the Monasteries and handed over as an endowment for his new foundation of Trinity College in the University of Cambridge. The Great North Road (currently Old London Road) ran through Barnby Moor, and was a route for highwaymen, by the 18th century as traffic and the Industrial Revolution increased the demand for improved roads, a new road was cut through Gamston, Retford and Barnby Moor. The A1 road eventually replaced this as the main route north from London to Edinburgh. In the 16th century, the village was used as the headquarters of Royal Army Forces who were engaged to crush a rebellion in Doncaster.

The village had a coaching inn, the ‘Blue Bell’ which was always referred to as ‘the Bell’ and later ‘The Olde Bell Hotel’. It was originally a private residence and divided into two, one side was used as a chapel as the village did not have a church, the arrangement being unusual for the time. The inn became well known during the 18th century when stagecoaches began running and in 1714, a traveler remarked there were so many coaches at the Bell that ‘some were ill to find room’. A notable landlord was George Clark, who was a sportsman and horse-breeder. A notable incident involved a Captain Swing and his men setting fire to hay close to the Bell during a bitter row between peasants and landowners. From 1840, the Bell had capacity to stable 120 horses and beds for the post boys, if more stabling was required, an alternative site was the White Horse Inn. Famous people who stayed there include Princess Victoria who later became queen, Edmund Gwenn, and Sir Walter Scott.

John Cromwell was born in the village and was a congregationalist who was presented by Oliver Cromwell (no relation) to the rectory in Clayworth, in 1664 he was sentenced for alleged involvement in the Farnley Wood Plot, he became very ill in prison and had to be rescued by the Duke of Newcastle, he returned to Barnby Moor but later died and was buried in nearby Sutton-cum-Lound. In the 18th century, Barnby Moor had a Mansion House with surrounding pleasure-grounds but these were built on by Mr Darcy Clark, who replaced it with Barnby Moor House. Joshua Gladwin Jebb bought it in 1875 but it was pulled down in 1881 and rebuilt. He died in 1901 and his son Sydney inherited the estate and Firbeck Hall from a relative, however he preferred the latter and sold Barnby Moor House to the Barber family, notably holding coal rights, including Harworth Colliery. One of the Barbers married into the Darleys, who were a Yorkshire brewing family.

The village has since expanded but it is still one of the smallest in Nottinghamshire. Historically the village was an agricultural village, but in latter years is a commuter settlement and seen many changes. The village shop, post office and church have become private residences and The Reindeer Hotel is an old people's home. Some recent ‘infill’ development along the Great North Road has created a number of new residences.

== People ==
Beatrice Tomasson, the mountaineer, was born here in 1859 to William and Sarah Anne Tomasson, she was their second child.

== See also ==
- Listed buildings in Barnby Moor
