= Tezze sul Brenta =

Tezze sul Brenta Tetsch (Cimbrian)
- Comune
- Comune di Tezze sul Brenta
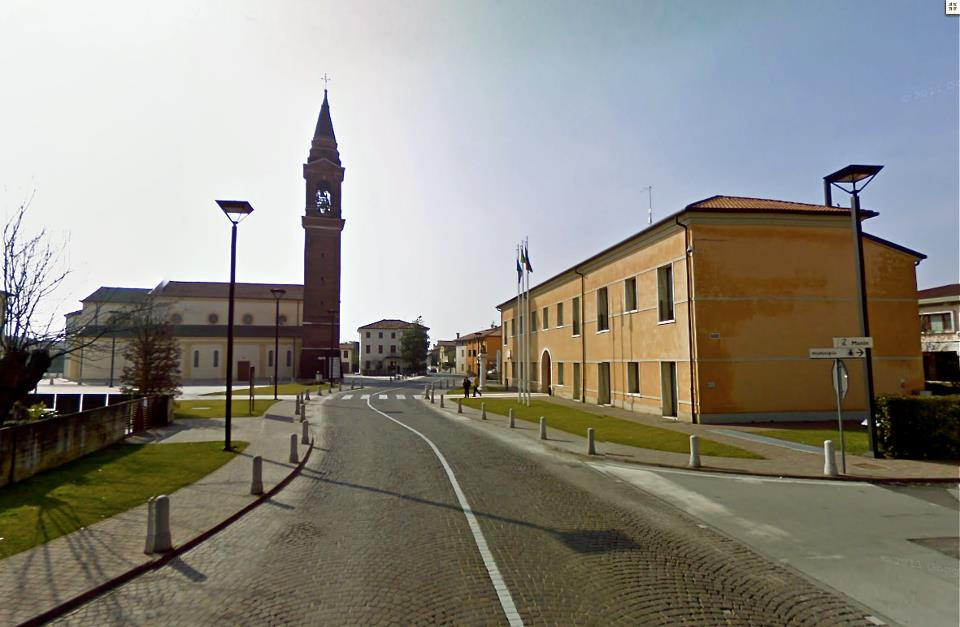
- View of Tezze sul Brenta

- Location within Italy Location within Veneto
- Coordinates: 45°41′N 11°42′E
- Country: Italy
- Region: Veneto
- Province: Vicenza (VI)
- Frazioni: Belvedere, Campagnari, Cusinati, Granella, Laghi, Stroppari

Government
  - Mayor: Luigi Pellanda

Area
  - Total: 18 km^{2} (6.9 sq mi)
- Elevation: 69 m (226 ft)

Population (30 November 2024)
  - Total: 12,984
  - Density: 720/km^{2} (1,900/sq mi)
- Demonym: Tedaroti
- Time zone: UTC+1 (CET)
  - Summer (DST): UTC+2 (CEST)
- Postal code: 36056
- Dialing code: 0424
- ISTAT code: 024104
- Website: Official website

Tezze sul Brenta (Cimbrian: Tetsch) is a town in the province of Vicenza, Veneto, Italy. It is northeast of SP51.

== Sources ==
- (Google Maps)
