= Marmolada Glacier =

Glacier in Trentino-Alto Adige, Italy

- ghiacciaio della Marmolada (Italian); dlaciá dla Marmolèda (Ladin); Marmolatagletscher (German)
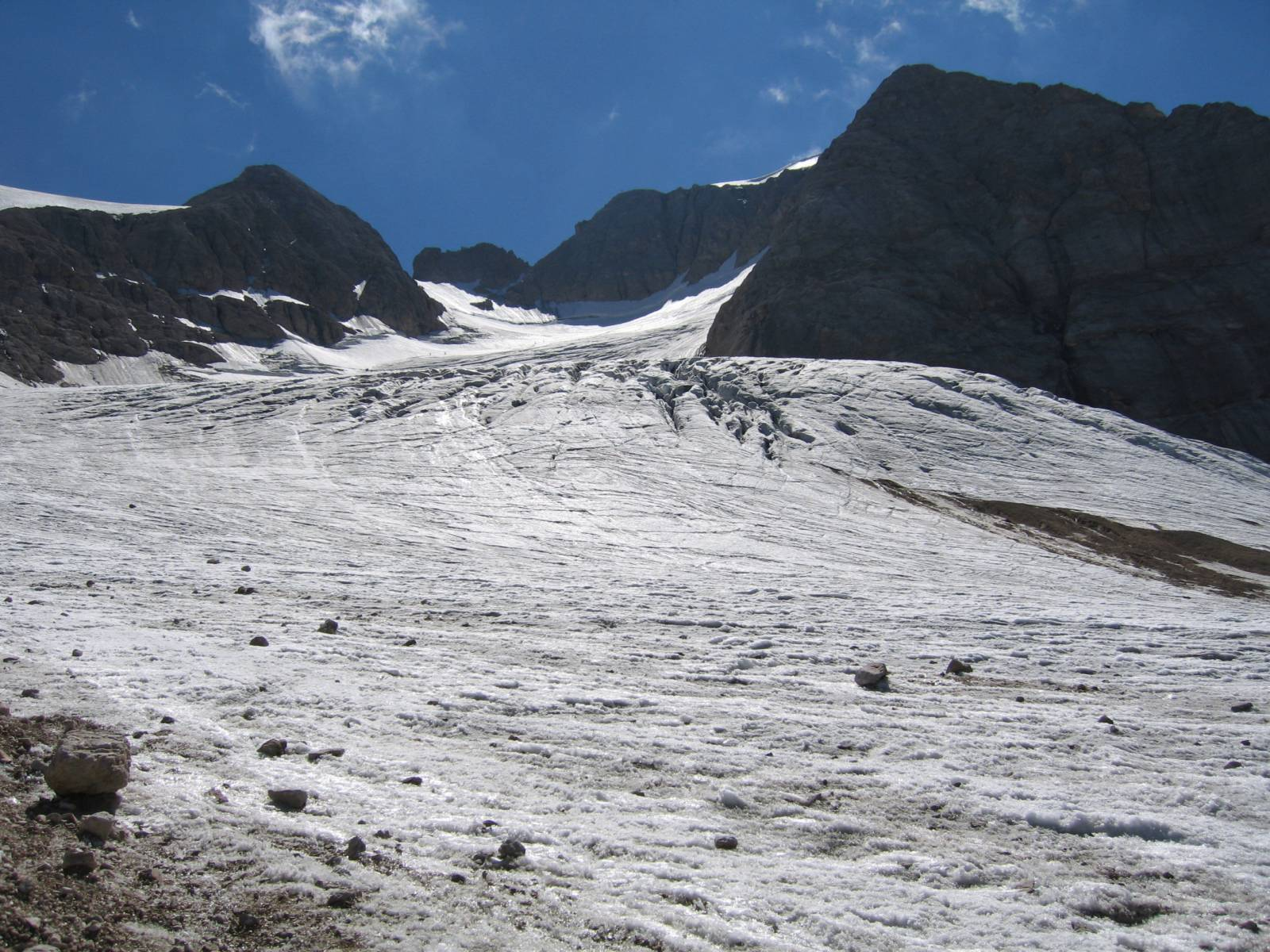
- A view of the Marmolada Glacier.

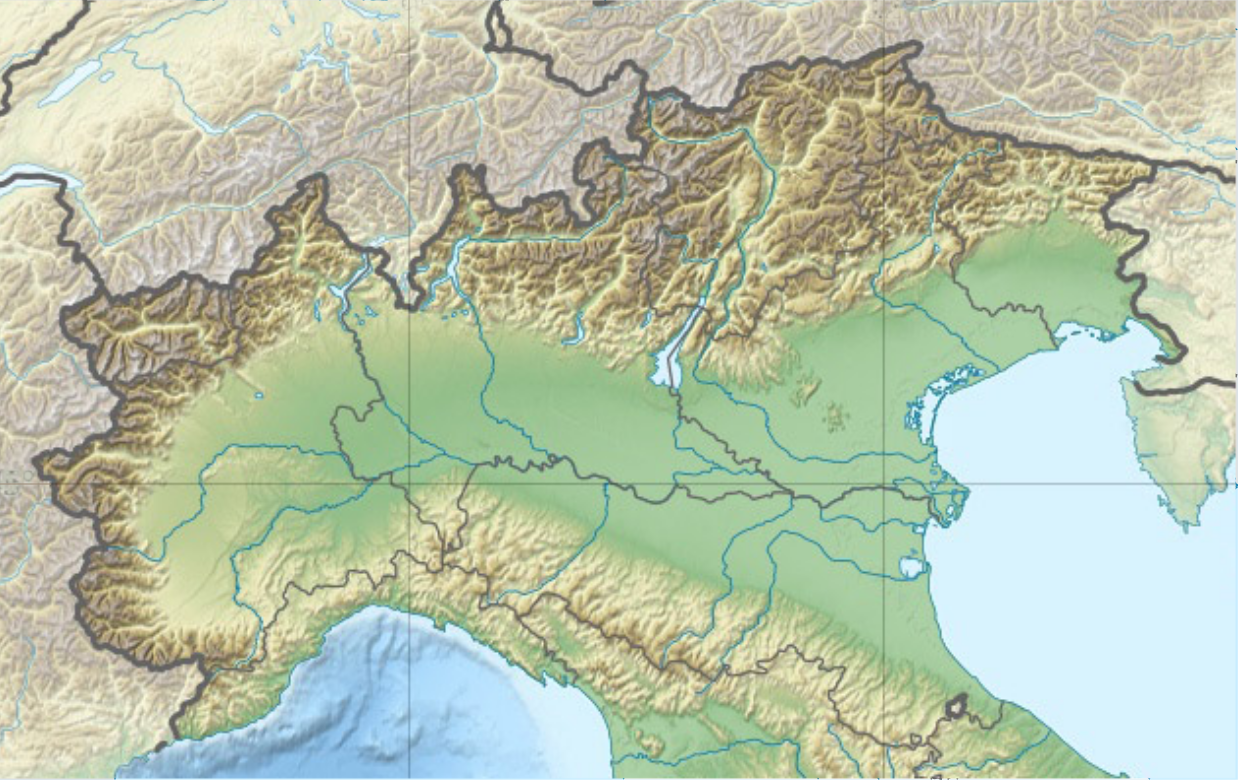
- Location within Alps Location within Northern Italy
- Interactive map of Marmolada Glacier
- Location: Marmolada Ok the Dolomites section of the Alps, province of Belluno, Italy
- Coordinates: 46°26′N 11°52′E

The Marmolada Glacier (Italian: ghiacciaio della Marmolada; Ladin: dlaciá dla Marmolèda; German: Marmolatagletscher) is located on the mountain Marmolada in the province of Belluno, northeast Italy.

== Geography ==
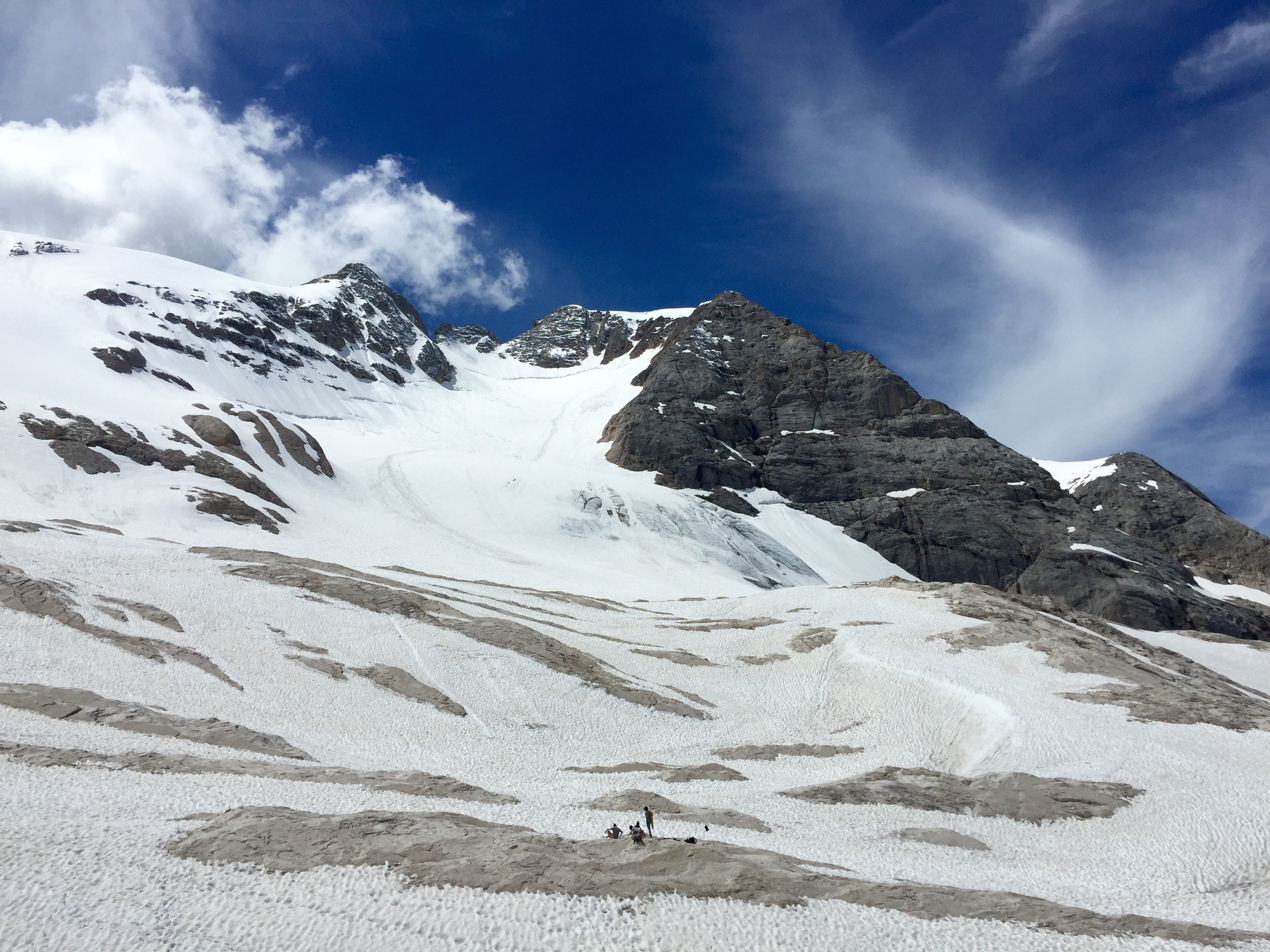
The glacier in June 2015, seen from Pian dei Fiacconi.

Marmolada Glacier is the only major one in the Dolomites section of the Alps. During World War I, the front line between Austrian and Italian forces ran over Marmolada, and Austrian soldiers built quarters in glacier tunnels, forming an "ice city" of considerable size. A World War I museum, Museo della Grande Guerra in Marmolada, is located in the valley below the glacier.

== Incidents ==
On 3 July 2022, a serac collapse killed 11 mountaineers.
