= Fedaia Lake =

Reservoir in the Dolomites, Italy

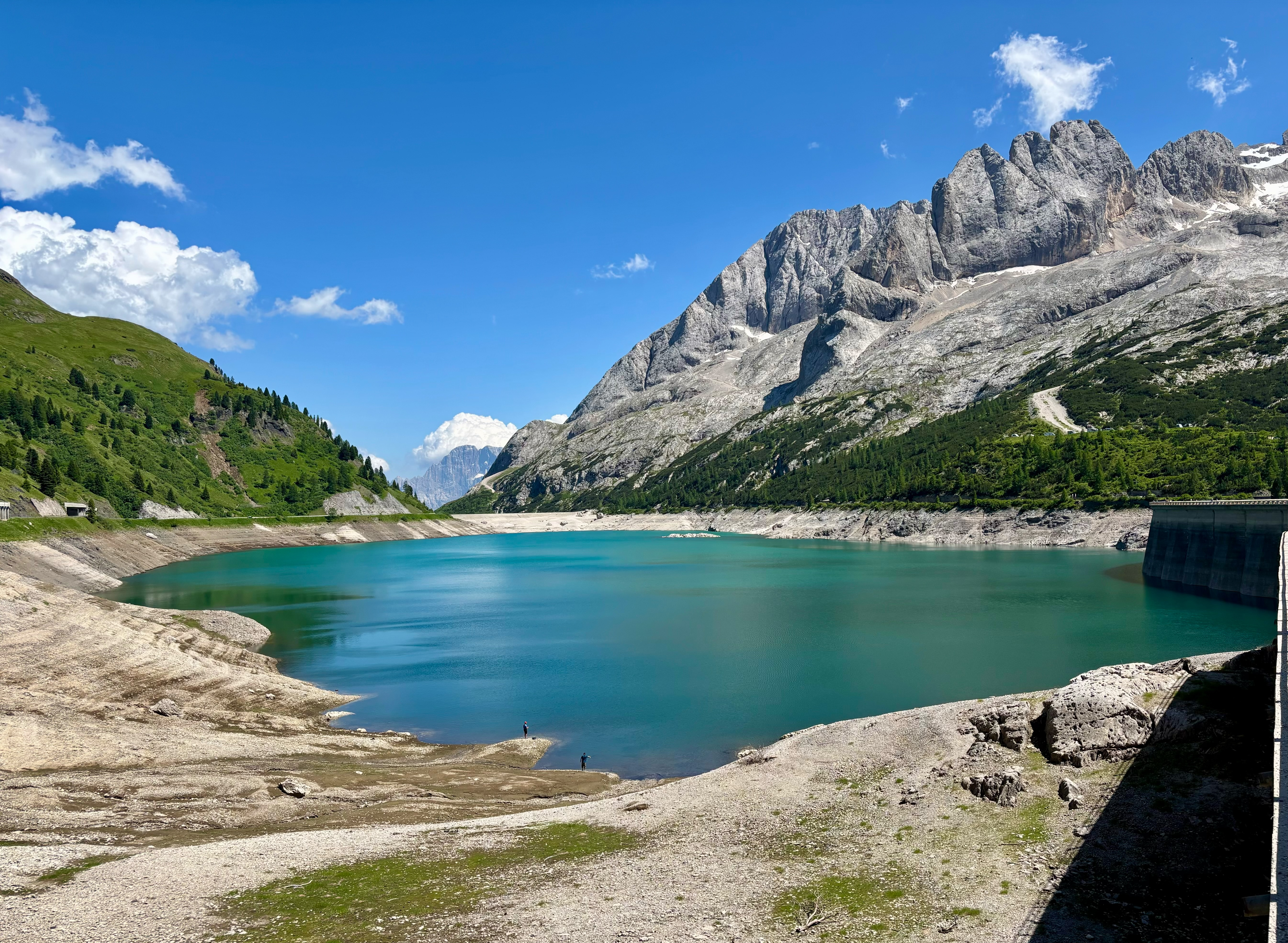
- Fedaia Lake with the Marmolada in the background

- Location within Italy
- Location: Trentino / Province of Belluno, Italy
- Coordinates: 46°27′24″N 11°52′47″E
- Type: Reservoir
- Primary inflows: Marmolada glacier meltwater
- Primary outflows: Avisio
- Basin countries: Italy
- Surface elevation: 2,054 m (6,739 ft)

Fedaia Lake (Italian: Lago di Fedaia) is a reservoir at an elevation of 2,054 m (6,739 ft) on the Fedaia Pass in the Dolomites, Italy. It lies on the border between Trentino and the Province of Belluno (Veneto), at the foot of the Marmolada, the highest peak in the Dolomites. The name of the pass derives from the Ladin word feida (sheep), as the area was formerly used for grazing.

The reservoir was created by the construction of a dam 57 m (187 ft) high, 622 m (2,041 ft) long, and 42 m (138 ft) thick at the base. The resulting lake is approximately 2 km (1.2 mi) long. Since 1950 it has been used for hydroelectric power generation, with a capacity of 20 MW, drawing on meltwater from the Marmolada glacier. In 1950 the physicist Antonio Rostagni of the University of Padua established a cosmic ray laboratory at the foot of the dam, which operated until 1955.

== See also ==
- Fedaia Pass
- Marmolada
