= Marmolada =

Mountain in the Dolomites, Italy

- Queen of the Dolomites
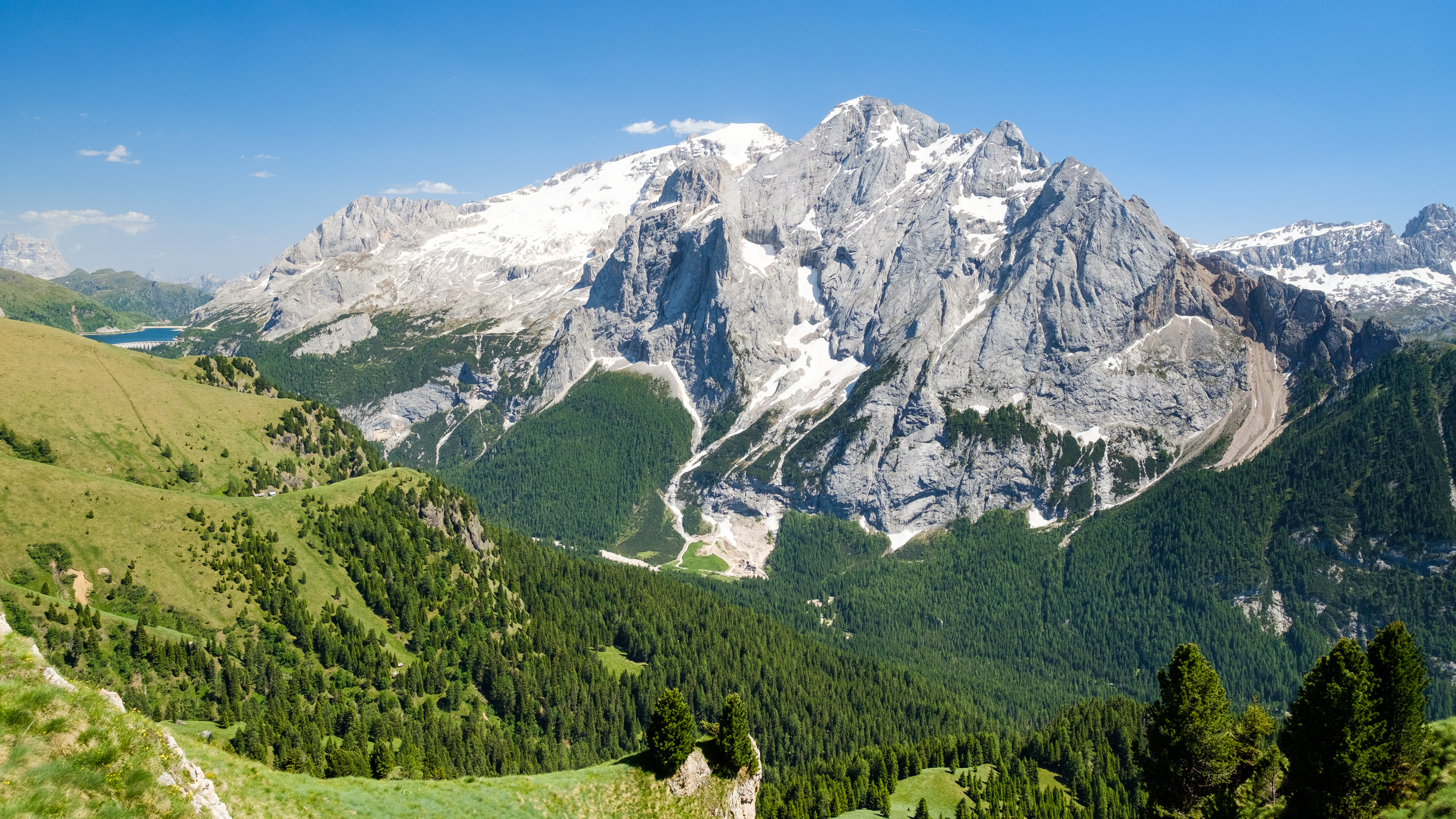
- Marmolada seen from Col di Rosc in June 2019

Highest point
- Elevation: 3,343 m (10,968 ft)
- Prominence: 2,131 m (6,991 ft); Ranked 9th in the Alps
- Listing: Ultra; Alpine mountains above 3000 m
- Coordinates: 46°26′05″N 11°51′03″E

Geography
- Location within Alps
- Location: Italy
- Parent range: Dolomites

Climbing
- First ascent: 28 September 1864 by Paul Grohmann, Angelo Dimai, Fulgenzio Dimai
- Easiest route: rock/ice climb

Marmolada (Ladin: Marmolèda; German: Marmolata, pronounced [maʁmoˈlaːta]) is a mountain in northeastern Italy and the highest mountain of the Dolomites (a section of the Alps). It lies between the borders of Trentino and Veneto. The Marmolada is an ultra-prominent peak (Ultra), known as the "Queen of the Dolomites". In 2009, as part of the Dolomites, the Marmolada massif was named a UNESCO World Heritage site. The largest glacier in the Dolomites, the Marmolada Glacier, is located on the northern face of the mountain.

== Geography ==
The mountain is located about 100 kilometres (62 mi) north-northwest of Venice, from which it can be seen on a clear day. It consists of a ridge running west to east. Towards the south it breaks suddenly into sheer cliffs, forming a rock face several kilometers long. On the north side, there is a comparatively flat glacier, the only large glacier in the Dolomites (the Marmolada Glacier, Ghiacciaio della Marmolada).

The ridge is composed of several summits, decreasing in altitude from west to east: Punta Penia 3,343 metres (10,968 ft), Punta Rocca 3,309 metres (10,856 ft), Punta Ombretta 3,230 metres (10,600 ft), Monte Serauta 3,069 metres (10,069 ft), and Pizzo Serauta 3,035 metres (9,957 ft). An aerial tramway goes to the top of Punta Rocca. During the ski season, the Marmolada's main ski run is open for skiers and snowboarders alike, making it possible to ski down into the valley.

The Dolomites
UNESCO World Heritage Site
- Interactive map of The Dolomites
- Location: Dolomites
- Criteria: vii, viii
- Reference: 1237rev-002
- Inscription: 2009 (33rd Session)
- Coordinates: 46°25′54″N 11°51′23″E

== History ==
Paul Grohmann made the first ascent in 1864, along the north route. The south face was climbed for the first time in 1901 by Beatrice Tomasson, Michele Bettega and Bartolo Zagonel.

=== First World War ===
Until the end of World War I the border between Austria-Hungary and Italy ran over Marmolada, so it formed part of the front line during that conflict. Austro-Hungarian soldiers were quartered in deep tunnels bored into the northern face's glacier, and Italian soldiers were quartered on the south face's rocky precipices. It was also the site of fierce mine warfare on the Italian Front.

On December 13, 1916, an avalanche on Marmolada became known as White Friday, striking the Austro-Hungarian barracks and killing 270 soldiers. The Gran Poz avalanche is the deadliest avalanche ever recorded. As glaciers retreat, soldiers' remains and belongings are occasionally discovered.

=== 2022 Serac collapse ===
On 3 July 2022, a serac collapsed which led to the sliding downstream of over 200,000 m^{3} of ice and debris, killing eleven people and wounding eight more.

== Selected climbing routes ==
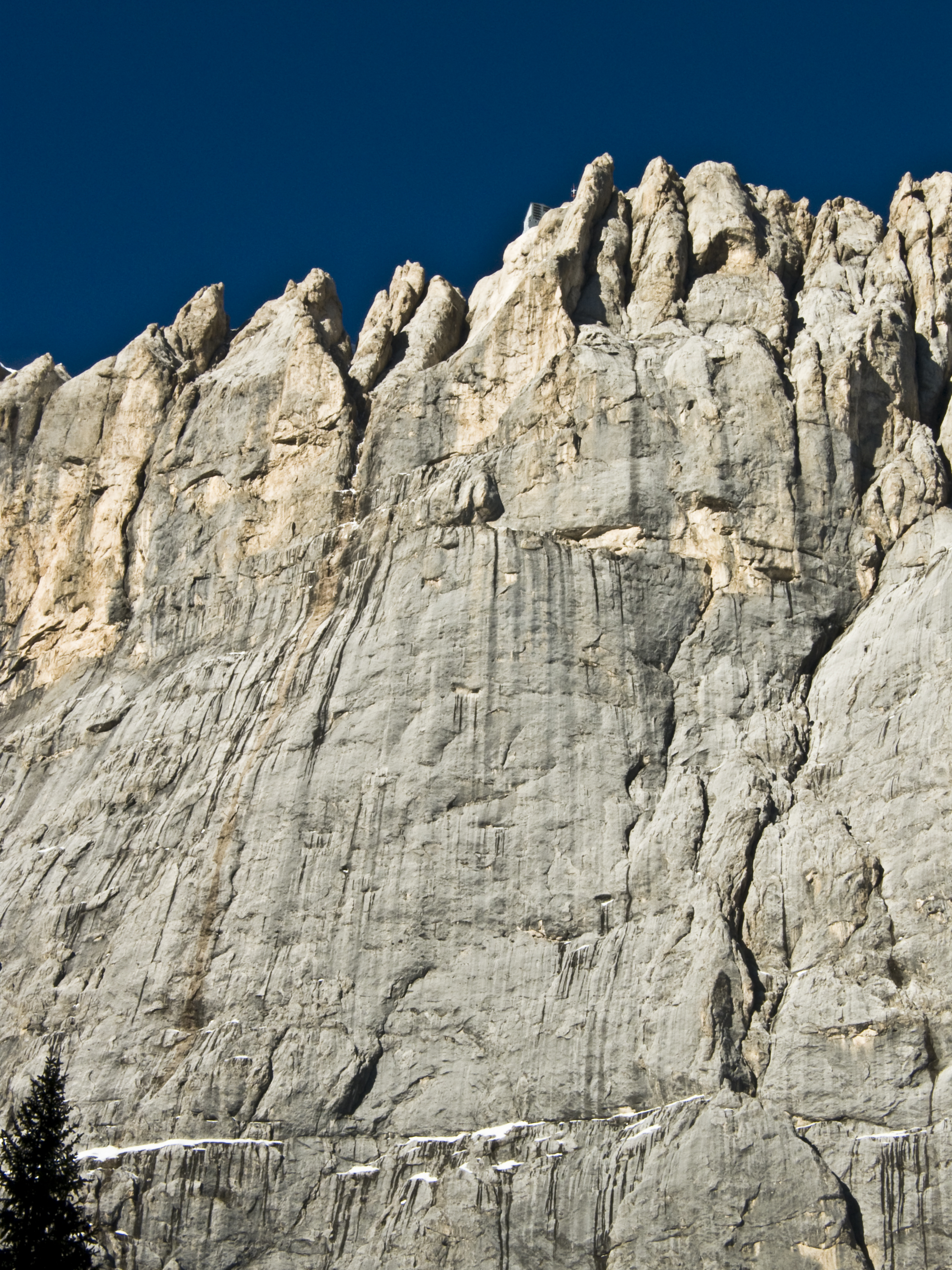
The expanse of rock on Marmolada d'Ombretta's south face has made it a popular destination for rock climbers.

The south face of Marmolada Ombretta has become a mecca for rock climbers. Climbers have set over 200 routes with varying difficulties. They include:

- 1979 – Don Quixote, south face of Marmolada di Ombretta. First ascent by Heinz Mariacher and Reinhard Schiestl
- 1981 – Fish Route, south face of Marmolada di Ombretta. First ascent by Jindrich Suster and Igor Koller.
- 1983 – Alì Babà, south face of Marmolada di Ombretta. First ascent by M. Giordani, F. Zenatti, P. Cipriani
- August 2008 – AlexAnna, southwest face of Punta Penia, Marmolada. First ascent by Rolando Larcher and Pilastro Lindo. 700m, 8a+/8b, 7b mandatory
- 2009/2011 – Invisibilis, south face of Marmolada di Ombretta. First ascent by Rolando Larcher and Geremia Vergoni. Route established over 5 days from 2009 to 2011. 405m, 7c+ max, 7a+ mandatory
- Summer 2011 – Bruderliebe, south face of Marmolada di Ombretta. first ascent by Hansjörg Auer and brother Vitus Auer. 8b/+
- September 2023 – Madre Roccia, South Face. First ascent by Iris Bielli, Matteo Della Bordella, Massimo Faletti and Maurizio Giordani. The 900m, 8b max and 7b mandatory.
- August 2024 – Ego Land, South Face. First ascent by Bernardo Rivadossi and Massimo Faletti. 410-meter multi-pitch, 8c/c+ max, 7c+ mandatory

== Climbing incidents ==
- 26 July 1938 – Three Italian climbers were killed by rockfall when a lightning bolt struck the cliff face.
- 3 September 2024 – Two highly experienced mountaineers, Francesco Favilli and Filippo Zanin, were fatally injured when they fell while climbing Don Quixote on Marmolada's south face. The cause of the accident was unknown.

== Gallery ==
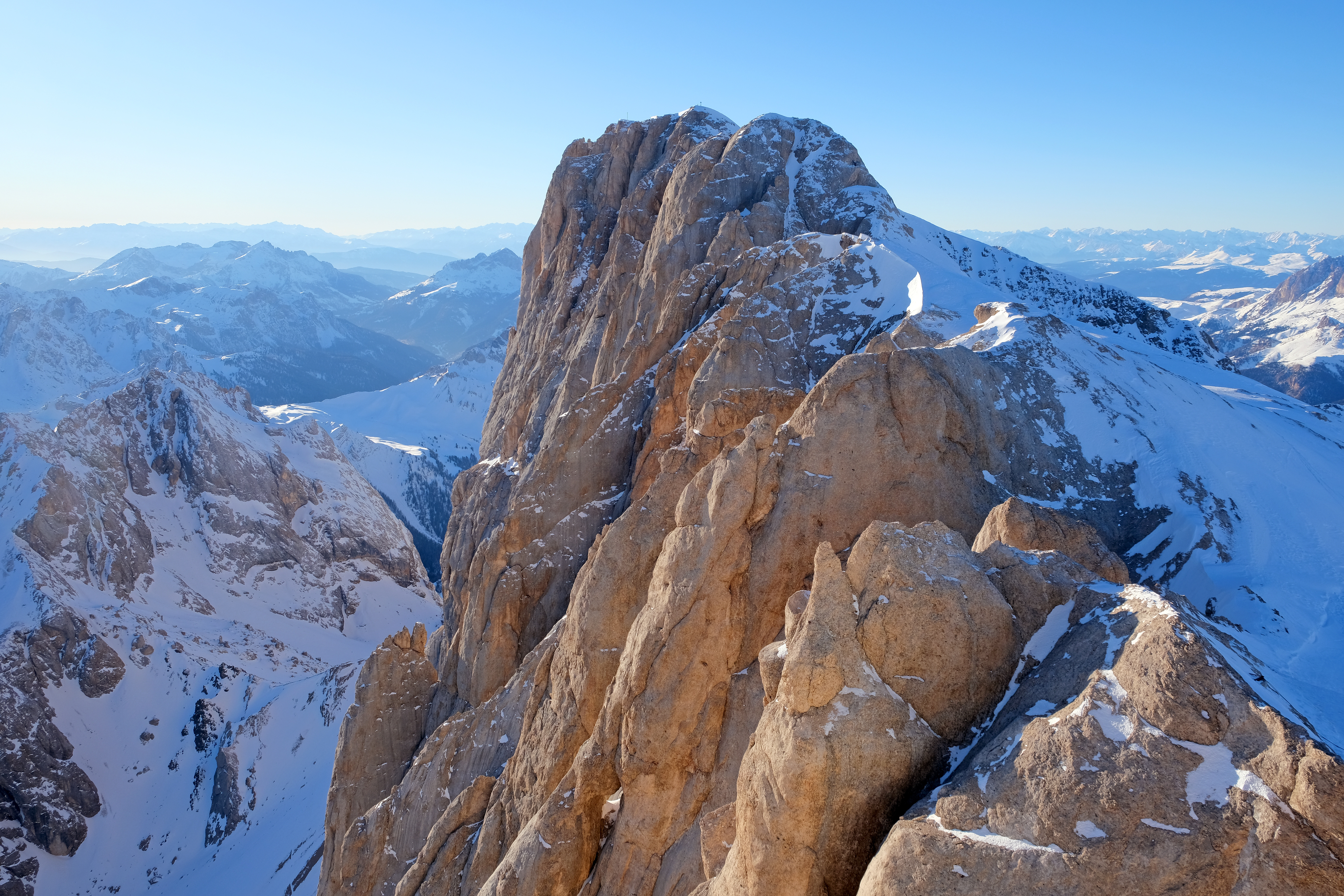
The highest point of Marmolada, Punta Penia

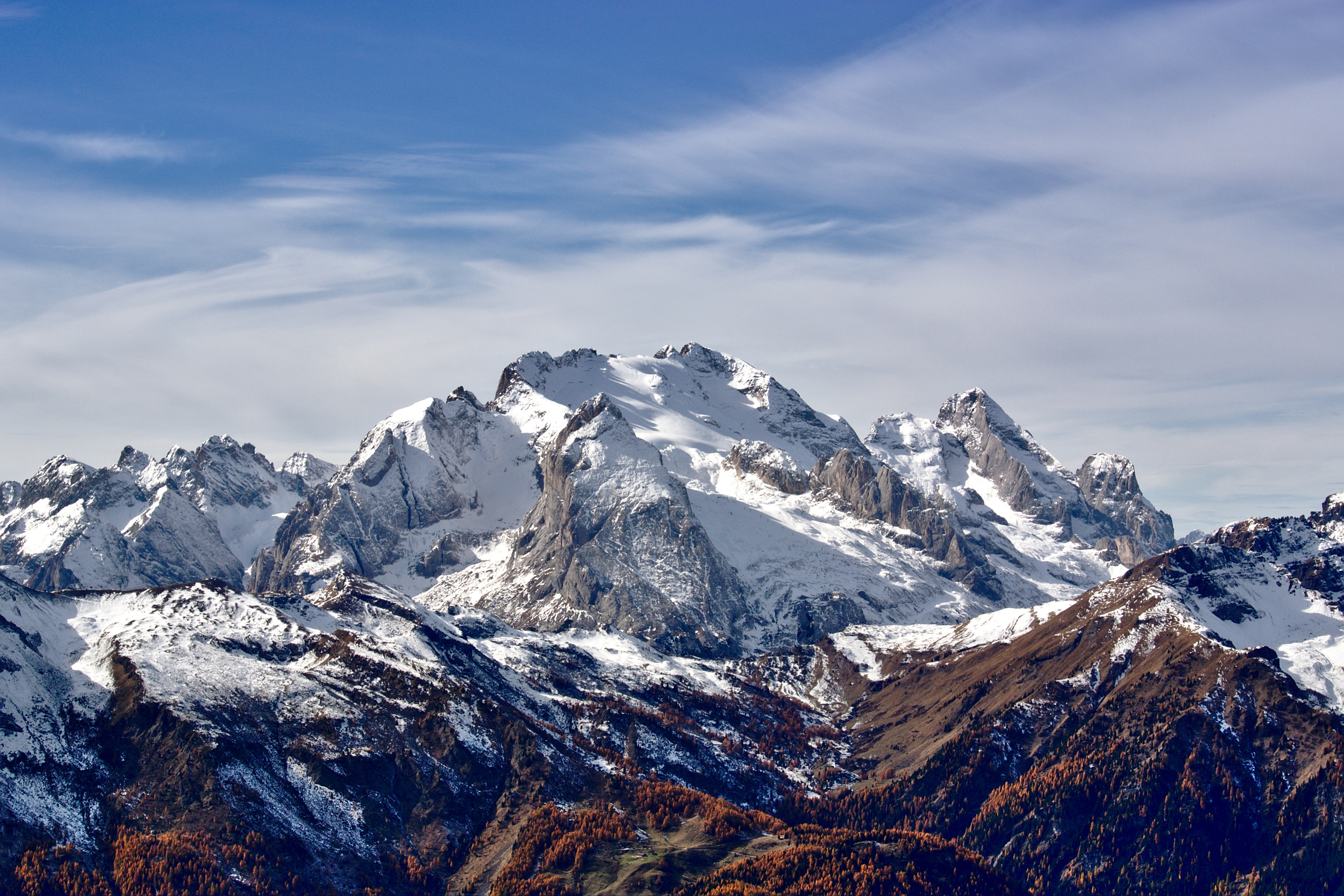
Marmolada in autumn

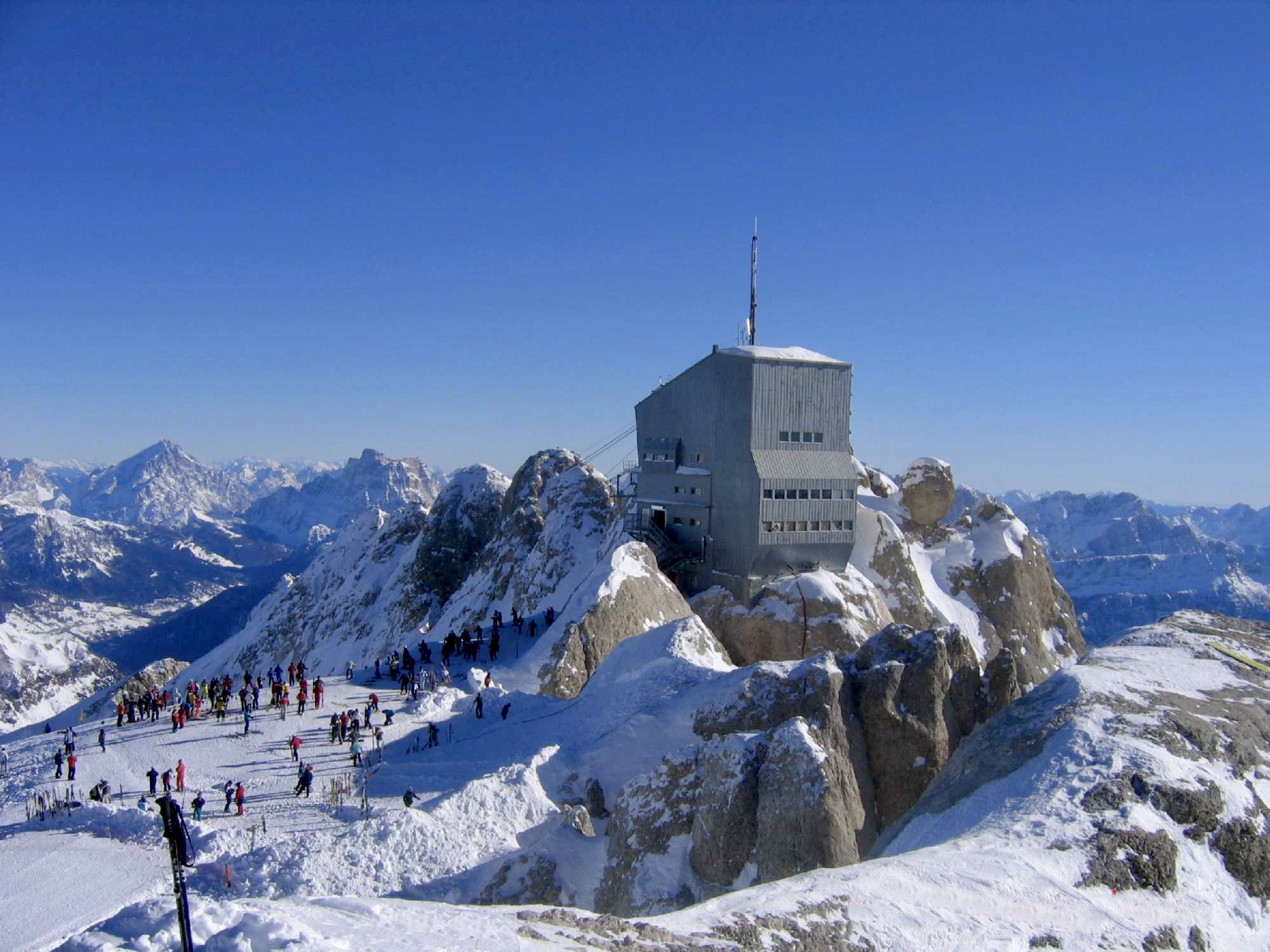
Punta Rocca, 3342 m

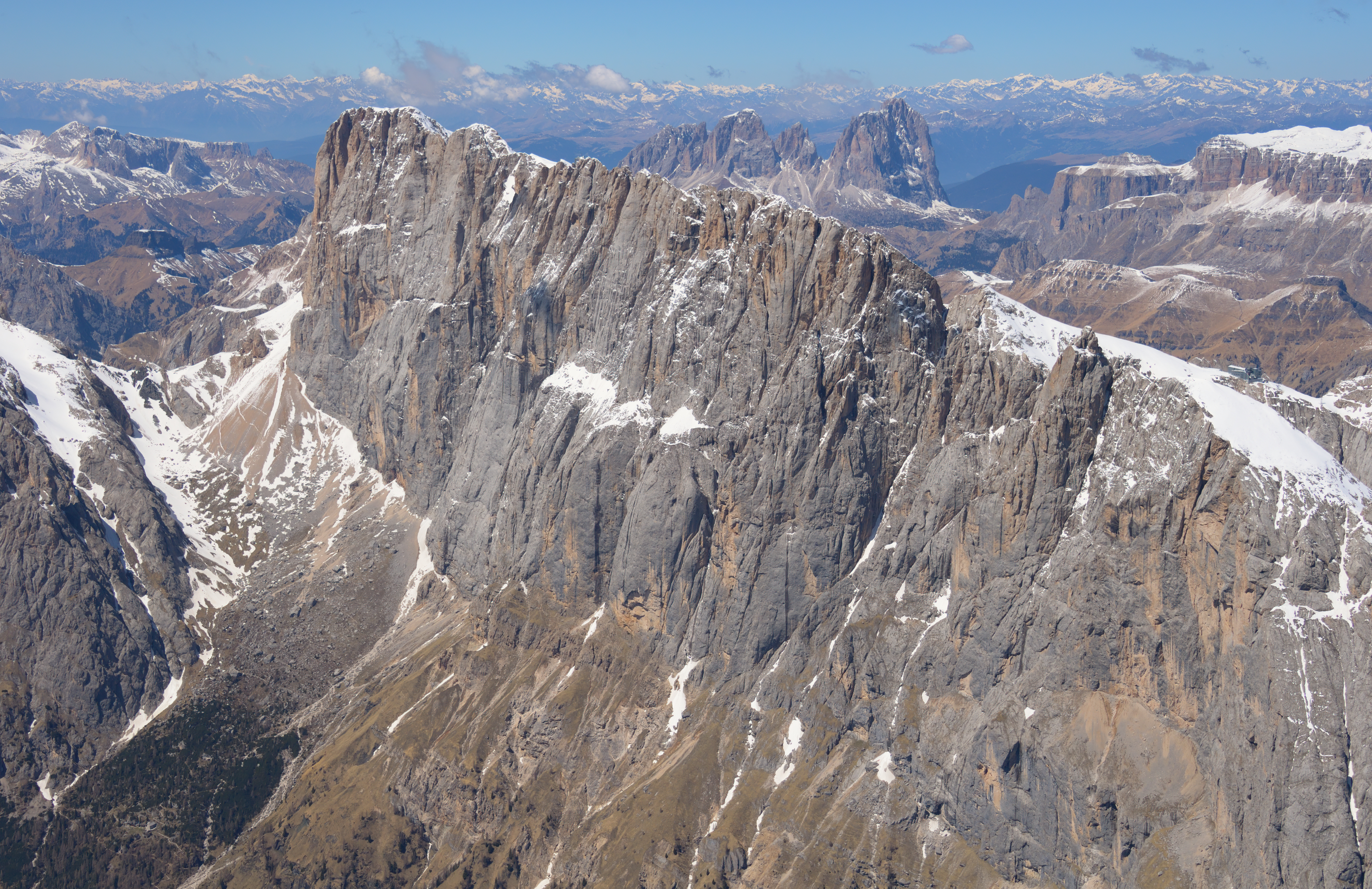
Aerial view of the south face of Marmolada

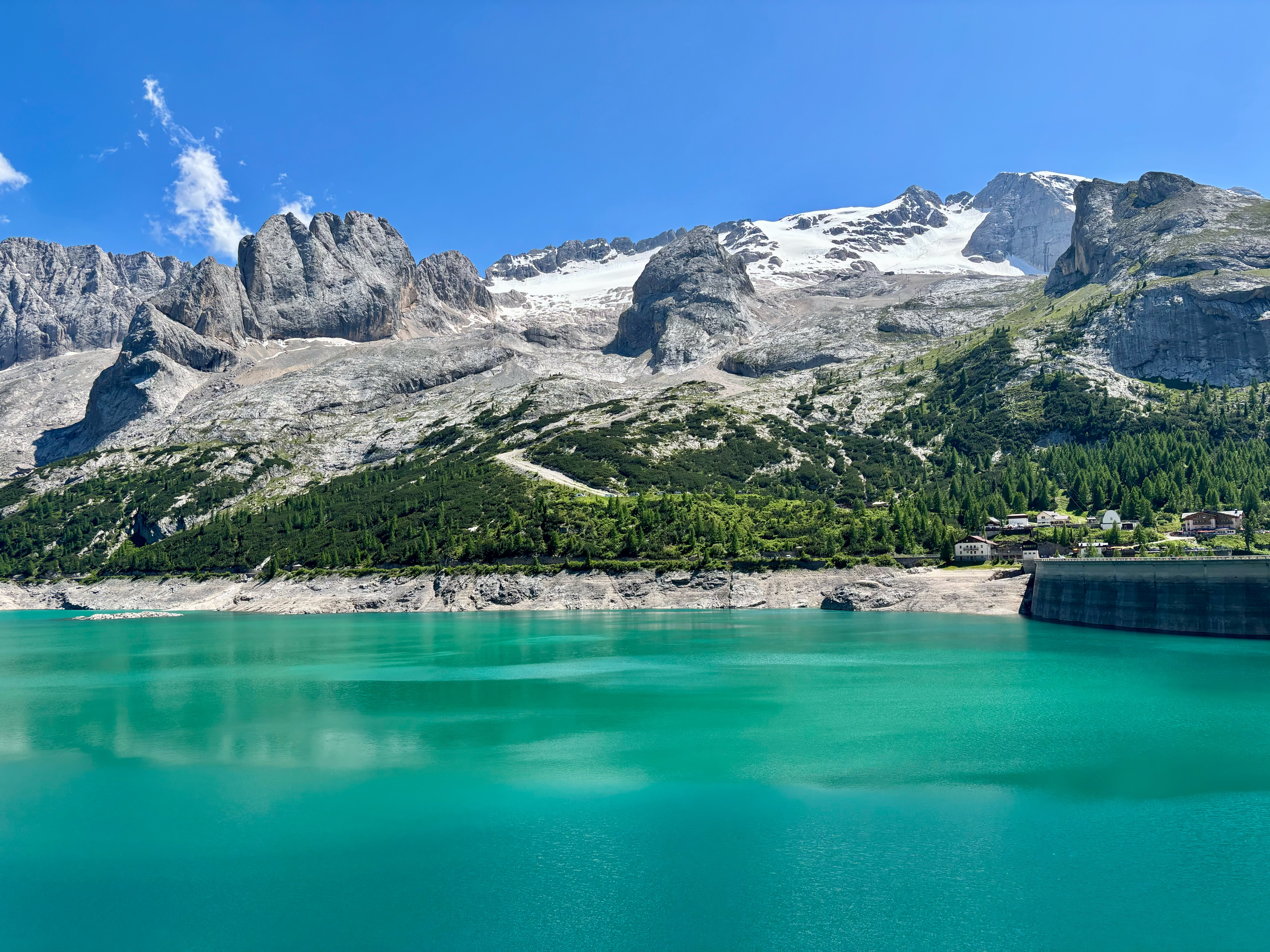
Lake Fedaia with the Marmolada glacier on the background

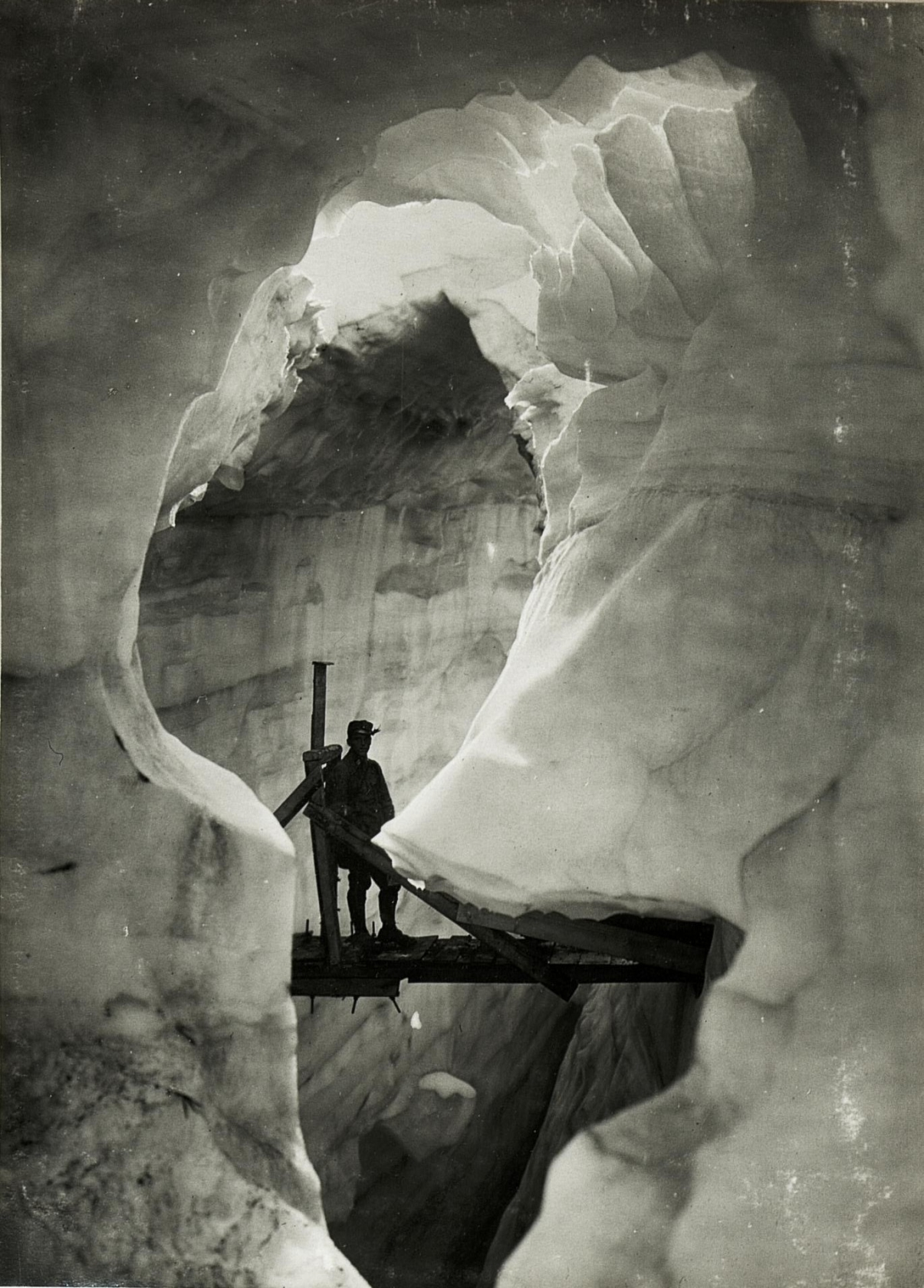
The so-called “Bridge of Sighs” in the Austrian tunnels under the Marmolada glacier

== See also ==
- Golden age of alpinism
- Italian front (World War I)
- List of Italian regions by highest point
- White Friday (1916)
- White War
