= White Friday (1916) =

Avalanche on the Italian Front of World War I

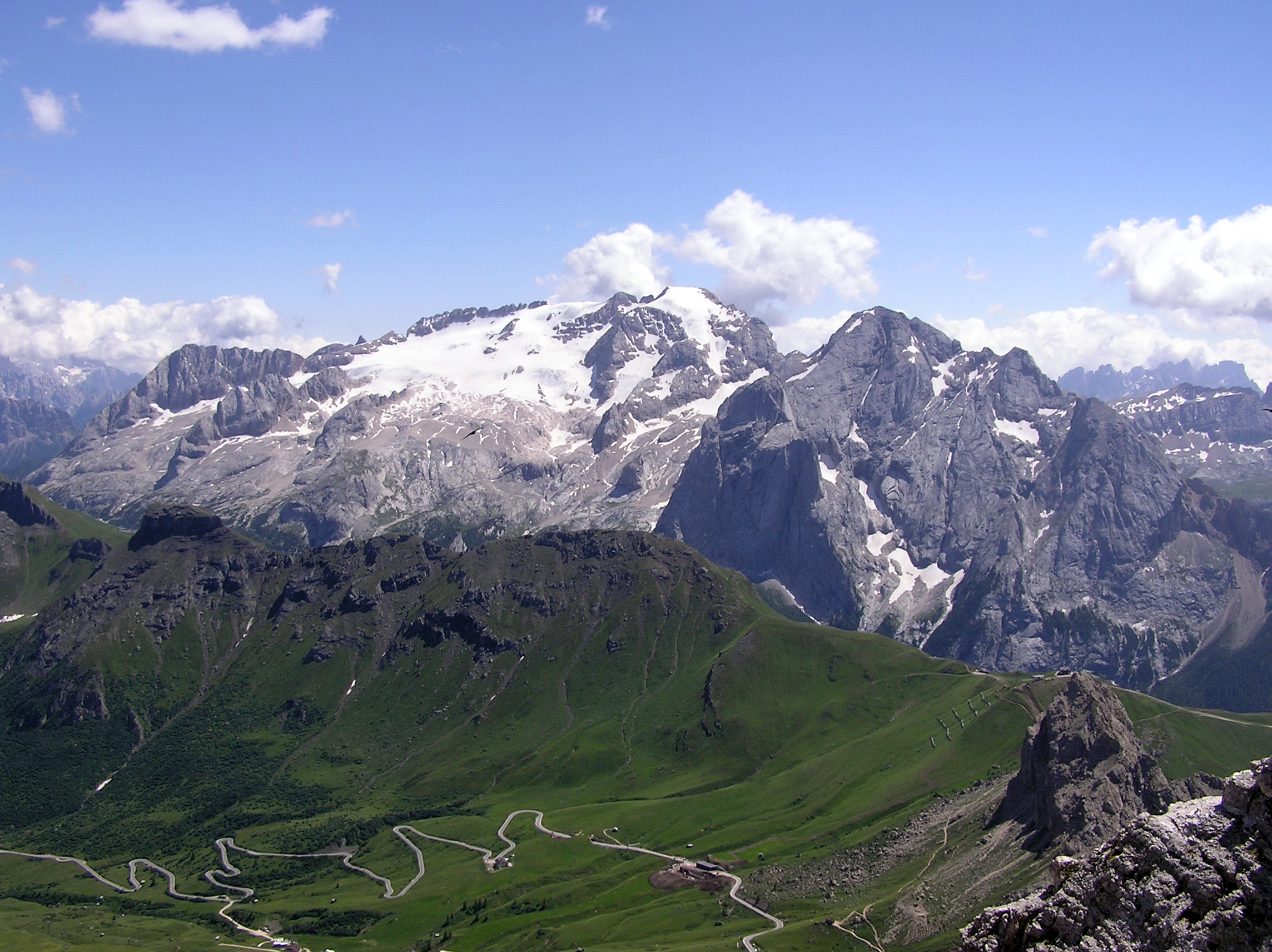
- Marmolada in 2004

- Date: 13 December 1916
- Time: 05:30 UTC
- Location: Dolomites, Italy
- Deaths: 2,000–10,000

White Friday was a series of avalanches on the Italian front of World War I. The most significant avalanche struck the Austro-Hungarian barracks on Mount Marmolada, killing 270 soldiers. Other avalanches on the same day would strike Italian and other Austro-Hungarian positions, killing hundreds. According to some reports, both sides deliberately fired shells into the weakened snowpacks in an attempt to bury the other side.

An accurate estimation of the number of casualties from the White Friday avalanches is not available; historical documents suggest at least 2,000 soldier deaths and a few dozen civilians.

Though the occurrence of avalanches in the Dolomites Mountains took place on a Wednesday in 1916, the term "White Friday" was used to coin the disastrous day, and the event is commemorated every year on 13 December, which is also marked by Saint Lucy's Day, a commemorative religious holiday practiced by the majority of Italian Catholics.

== Gran Poz summit avalanches ==
The Austro-Hungarian Kaiserschützen military barracks were built on the Gran Poz summit (approximately 3,400 m (11,000 ft) above sea level) of Mount Marmolada. The wooden barracks were built in August of the summer of 1916, to house the men of the 1st Battalion of the Imperial Rifle Regiment Nr.III (1.Btl. KschRgt.III). The location of the barracks was planned to be well situated to protect it from Italian attack and provide a defense atop the contested Mount Marmolada. The barracks was placed along rock cliffs to protect it from direct enemy fire and the location was out of high-angle mortar range.

During the winter of 1916, heavy snowfall and a sudden thaw in the Alps created conditions ripe for avalanches. From the beginning of December, the snow pile-up was recorded at 8–12 metres (26–39 ft) atop the summit. The Austro-Hungarian commander of the 1. Btl. KschRgt.III, Captain Rudolf Schmid, noticed the imminent danger his company faced. Out of fear his position would be soon untenable, Capt. Schmid wrote a request to his superior, Field Marshal Lieutenant Ludwig Goiginger of the 60th Infantry Division. The appeal to vacate the base atop Gran Poz summit was ultimately turned down. In the eight days before the avalanche, additional heavy snowfall disrupted telephone lines of communication and left each outpost stranded with a lack of supplies.

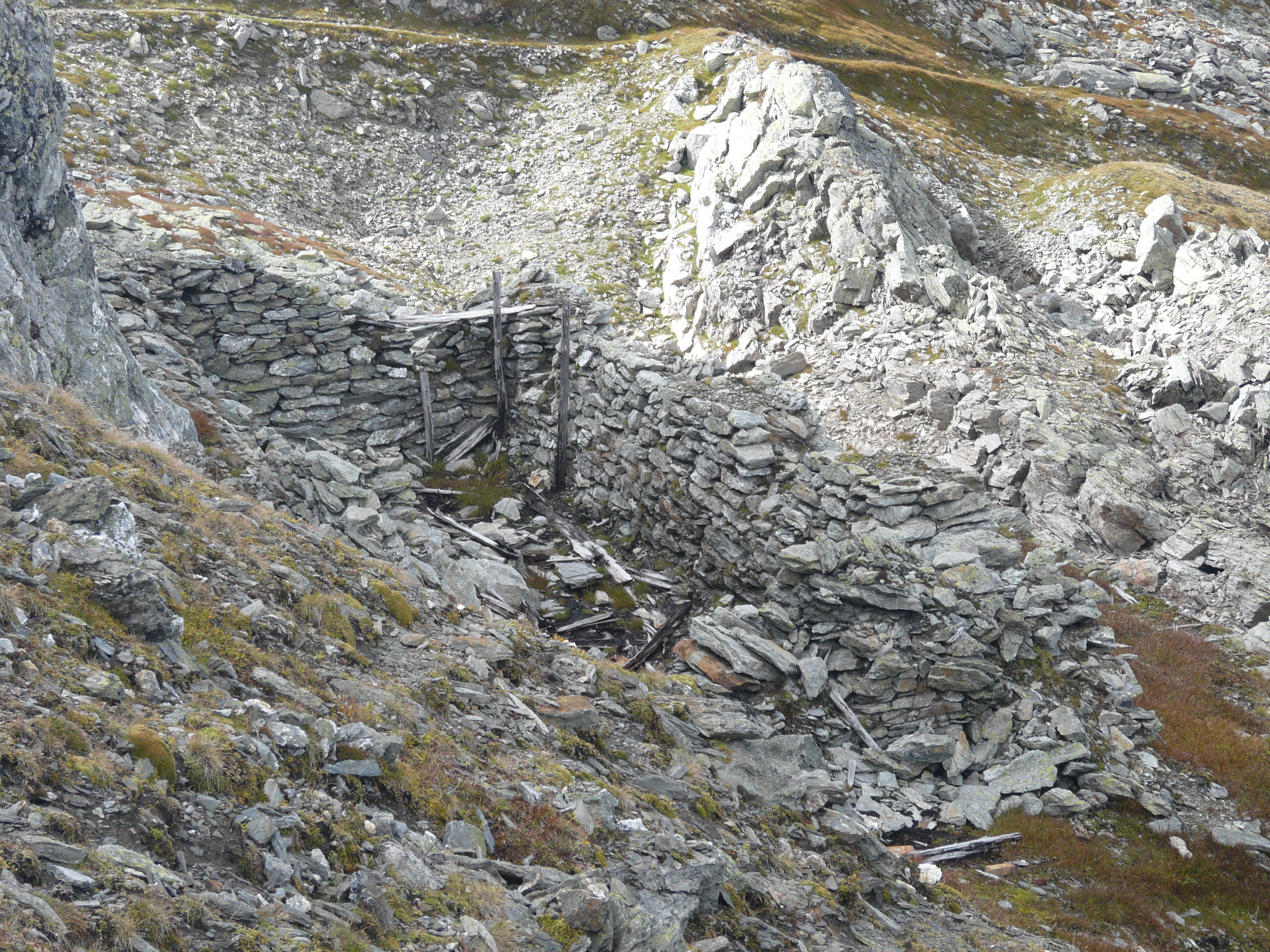
Remains of a destroyed Austro-Hungarian cache, Marmolada

On 13 December 1916, at 5:30 a.m., over 200,000 tons (approximately 1 million cubic metres) of snow and ice plunged down the mountainside directly onto the barracks. The wooden buildings packed with soldiers, collapsed under the weight of the avalanche, crushing the occupants. Of the 321 troops present, 229 were Kaiserschützen mountain infantry and 102 were Bosnians from a support column. Only a few were pulled to safety while 270 were buried alive. Only 40 of the bodies were ever recovered from the pileup. Among those who survived was Captain Schmid along with his aide, who escaped slightly injured.

== Val Ciampi d'Arei avalanches ==
On the night of 13 December, an avalanche struck an Italian division of the 7th Alpini, overrunning their mountain barracks. The Italians called the disastrous day La Santa Lucia Nera after Saint Lucia.

== Aftermath ==
In the aftermath of White Friday, 10,000 soldiers on all sides were killed in December from avalanches. Altogether, it constituted the greatest number of deaths caused by snow and ice debris from avalanches in history. When including all avalanche-related deaths (this includes mud and rock slides triggered subsequently by an avalanche), White Friday is the second-worst avalanche-related disaster recorded, after the 1970 Huascarán avalanche.

== See also ==
- List of deadliest avalanches
- Rigopiano avalanche
- White War
