= Carezza Dolomites =

Mountains in the Italian Alps

The Carezza Dolomites or Karersee Dolomiten (Tyrolean German) is a section of the Dolomites mountain range in South Tyrol, a linguistically German region in the Italian Alps. Located next to the mountains Rosengarten and Latemar, the Carezza Dolomites are popular with vacationers and tourists. Both the German and Italian names of the area derived from that of Karerpass and Karersee, an alpine lake. The villages closest to the Carezza Dolomites are Welschnofen and the eponymous Karersee (which is also in Welschnofen municipality).

Welschnofen is the main village (1,182 m) with accommodation, shops, restaurants and bars. Karersee is part of the comune of Welschnofen and lies 1,600 m above sea level at the foot of the Dolomites mountains Rosengarten and Latemar.

In summer, the Carezza Dolomites area is known for hiking – about 116 km of signposted paths lead to mountain huts, inns, and alps.

In winter, snowboarding in the Carezza Dolomites is popular; snowboarding and telemark World Cup championships will be held in the area in 2027.
