= King Laurin =

Part of a popular tradition in the Dolomites

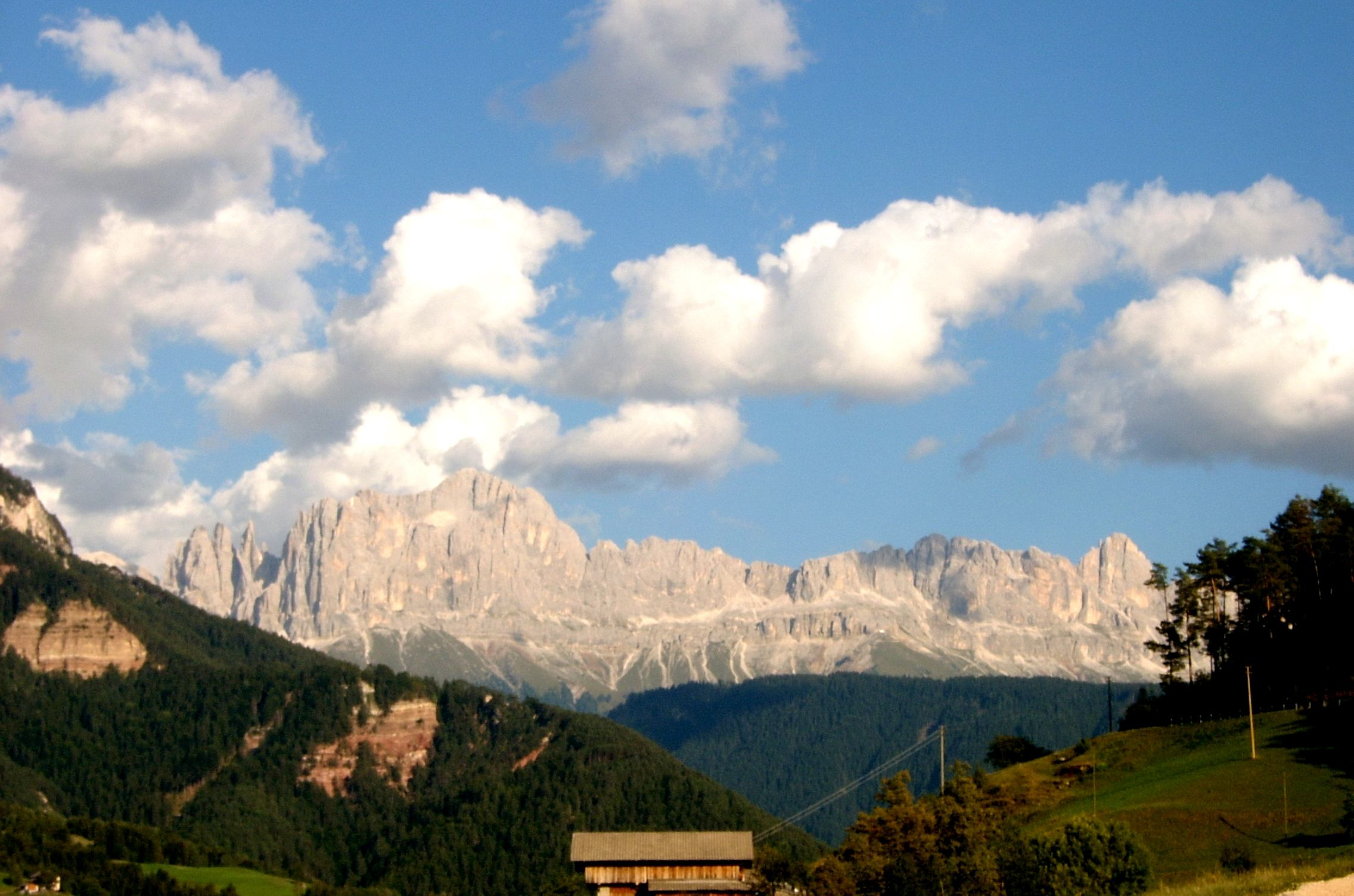
The Rosengarten mountain in the evening.

The South Tyrolean saga of King Laurin (German: König Laurin, Ladin: Re Laurin, Italian: Re Laurino) is part of a popular tradition in the Dolomites. It is a popular explanation of the optical phenomenon of Alpenglow (Ladin: Enrosadira), by which the summit of the mountains change their color to shades of red and purple during and after sunset. King Laurin's legend is also considered to be the source of the German name of the Rosengarten group (Italian: Catinaccio) between South Tyrol and the Trentino.

== The legends ==
=== King Laurin ===
King Laurin was the ruler of a thriving race of dwarfs who lived up here and mined the mountains for precious jewels and valuable ores. He possessed a subterranean palace made of sparkling quartz. But his special pride and joy was the great garden located in front of the entranceway to his underground crystal castle. Countless wonderful roses blossomed in this garden, whose scent was enchanting. But woe unto those who might attempt to pluck even only one of these roses! Laurin would order that his left hand and right foot be chopped off! He exacted the same punishment from anyone who tore the silken thread which surrounded his entire rose garden instead of a fence.

=== Similde ===
Similde was the beautiful daughter of the “King on the River Etsch.” One day, he felt that the time had come to marry off the girl. So he invited all of the noblemen in the neighboring lands to join with him in a May Day ride – but he did not invite Laurin, the King of the Dwarfs. Because of this, Laurin decided to wear his magic invisibility cape and attend without being detected. But as he caught sight of Similde, he immediately fell in love with her. So he grabbed her, leaped onto his horse, and galloped away.

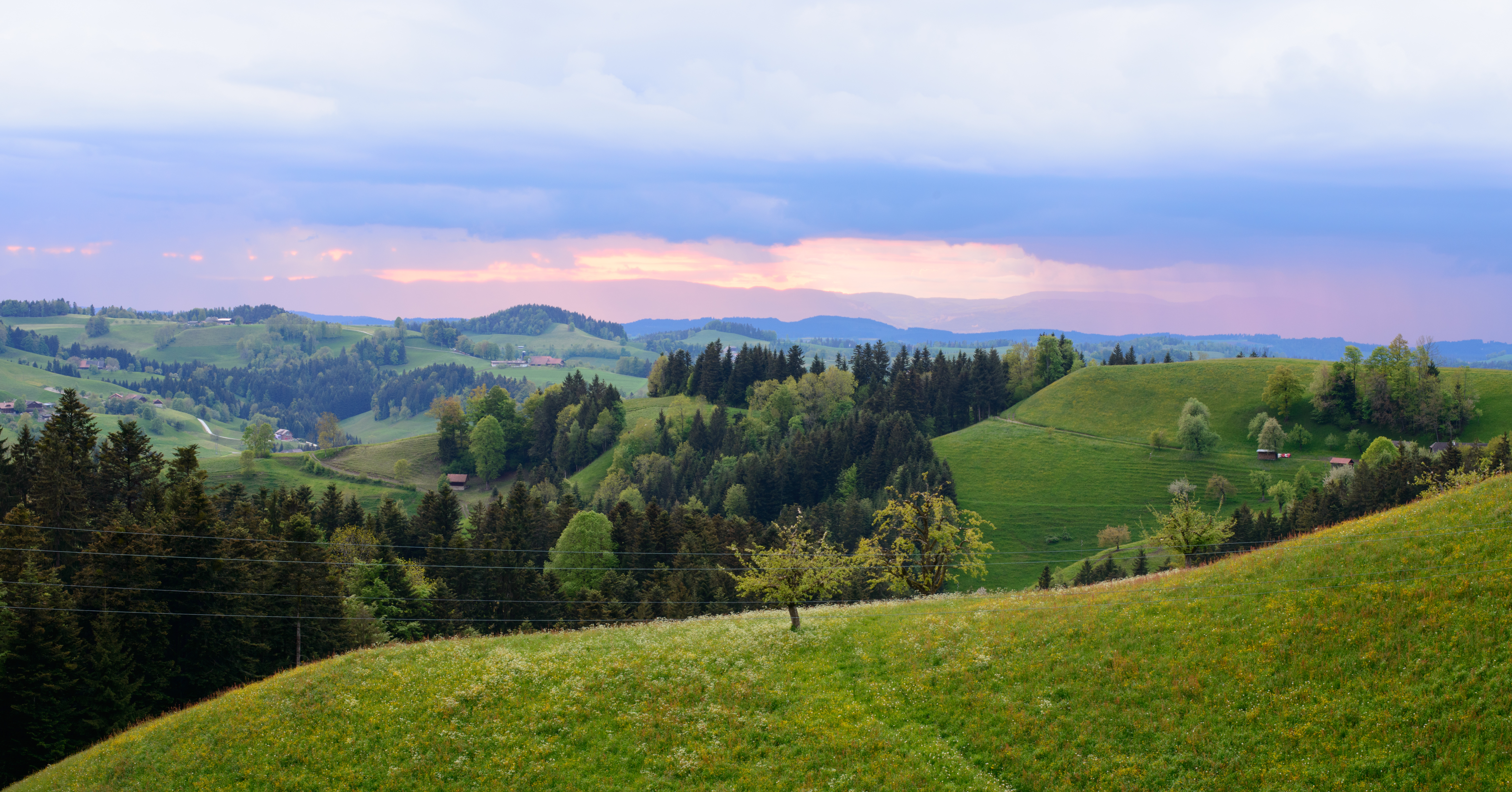
Alpenglow in Lucerne

The King on the River Etsch sent out his knights to find and rescue poor Similde. King Laurin, who believed that they would never discover him, pranced about in his Rose Garden. But the knights could see the roses swaying, and thus knew where Laurin was hiding. So they were able to trap him. Laurin was so angry at being discovered that he turned around and cursed the Rose Garden, which he believed had betrayed him: “Neither by day nor by night should anyone again glimpse this lovely sight.” But in saying that, Laurin had forgotten the time between day and night: the twilight. And so it is that the pink glow of the Rose Garden can still be seen at dawn and dusk.

=== Hartwig, Wittich, and Dietrich ===
For seven long days, the noblemen from the neighboring lands fought their contests to determine who should wed the beautiful Similde. Finally, there were only two champions left. It was decided that they should compete against each other in one final contest, with the victor winning the girl’s hand. One of the men was named Hartwig, and his shield bore the sign of the lily. The other was called Wittich, and the symbol of a snake could be seen on his shield.

In order to rescue the king’s daughter, Similde, Hartwig and Wittich turned to the great and famous Prince Dietrich of Bern for help. The prince promised to aid them, although his wise old captain of the armory Hildebrand warned him of the strange magical powers of the Dwarf King Laurin.

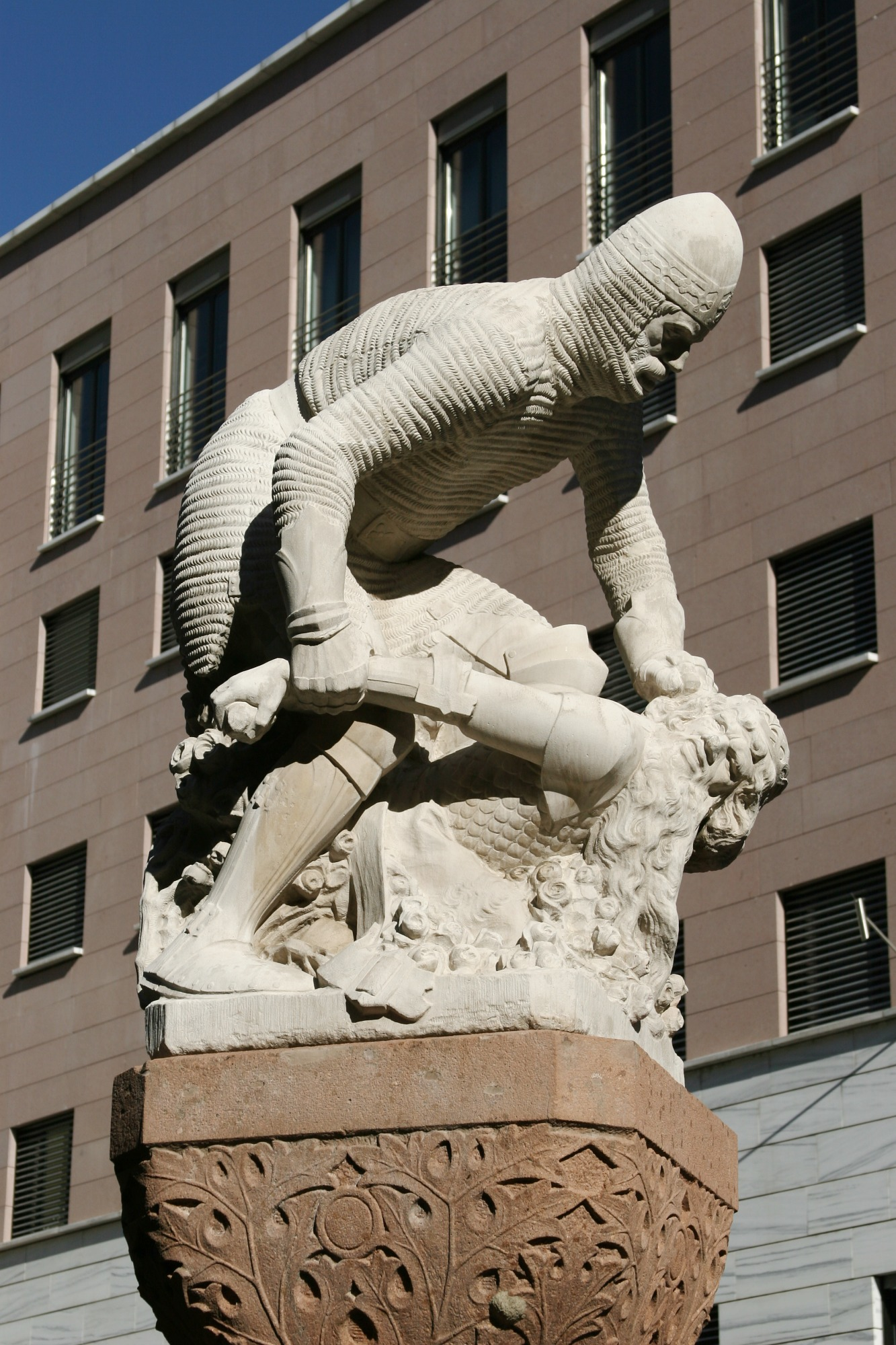
Dietrich fighting Laurin in a fountain in Bozen, South Tyrol

Hildebrand, the old captain of the armory, cried: "Rip up his belt!" But this was easier said than done, for after all, Dietrich was unable to see King Laurin, let alone grab him. But then Hildebrand had an idea: "Pay heed to the motion of the grass – then you will see where the dwarf is standing!" As Dietrich did this, he was able to see where Laurin was standing, so he ran to him, grabbed him around the middle, and broke his belt. Laurin thereupon fell to the ground, and Hildebrand was able to capture him.

=== Mènega ===
Mènega was a twelve-year-old maid who, together with her friends, herded the livestock on the Latemar. One day, an old man came by who had lost his knife. A short time later, the maid found the knife, and the man promised her and her friends a whole parade of dolls. On her way home, Mènega met a woman who taught her a spell so that the man would give her his dolls with golden crowns.

On the next day, the children waited for the old man until a doorway opened in the side of the mountain. Dolls wearing silk clothing appeared out of it. Mènega recited the spell, and the dolls were transformed into stone. Today, one can still see the silk clothing of the dolls sparkling in the sun.

=== The Water Nymph of the Karersee ===
There once lived a beautiful water nymph in the Karersee. She often sat on the shores of the lake, singing, but as soon as anyone would approach, she would dive back into the lake and vanish. To do this, some friendly birds would stay on the look-out. These chirping birds loved listening to the water nymph, but as soon as they heard some strange noise, they would twitter nervously and fly around in fear. Thus, the nymph would have time to dive into the lake and disappear, and never came into danger. But her curiosity was her undoing.

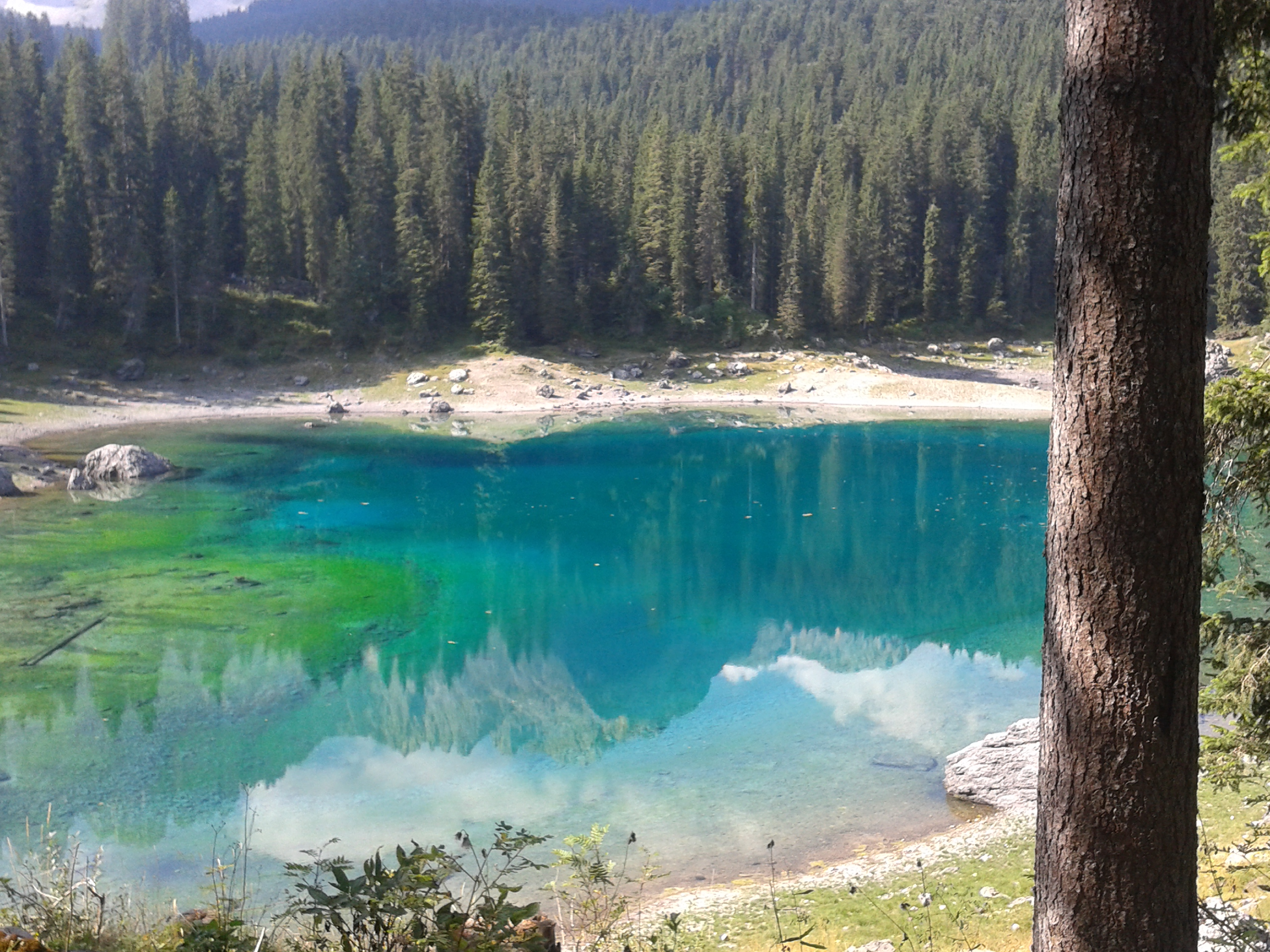
The Kariersee

Thus it happened that an evil sorcerer who had fallen in love with the nymph and planned to steal her asked for the advice of an evil witch. She advised him to stretch a rainbow from the Rose Garden to the Latemar, to disguise himself as a jewelry merchant, and so to entice the nymph away. But as he stretched out the rainbow and went to the lake, he forgot to disguise himself. The nymph recognized him and dived into the lake. The sorcerer was so furious that he threw the rainbow together with the jewels into the lake. And that is why the Karersee still glows in such lovely colors to this day.

=== The Dwarf of the Latemar ===
A poor farmer woman lived on a slope with her many children. They suffered greatly and often went hungry. The oldest child, a girl, had to leave home early to each day to work. One day, the girl discovered a dwarf in a crack in the mountain. The dwarf motioned for the girl to come closer. The girl did as she was ordered, and came to a large crack in the mountain in which there was a big pan. The dwarf posed the girl a question and said that she could have the pan if she answered it correctly, which she did. The girl dragged the pan home, where her family was amazed to see it. This magic pan would always fill up when it was put on the fire, even if only a few ingredients were placed into it. The family ate well and became prosperous.

Years later, as the girl – who had now grown into a young farmer woman – inherited the farmstead, she enlarged it and had seven children of her own. A short time later, there was a knock at the window, and the farmer woman knew what she would have to do. Starting then, she cooked for the dwarf and placed the food into the attic whenever she heard the knock at the door. This continued for many years, and the family continued to prosper. One day, the woman’s daughter-in-law was asked to cook by the dwarf, but she refused. Instead, she placed the empty pan into the attic. On the next day, the pan had disappeared, and the family suffered greatly, eventually losing everything. There, where their farmstead used to be, one can still see a red mass of loose rocks, and no one can live there.

=== Tschei ===
There was once a hermit named Tschei, who lived on a slope above Welschnofen. Tschei had been cruelly driven away by the villagers, and so he and his friend Jocher decided to climb up into the Rose Garden. Because no one in the village wanted to buy his cattle from him, they took them with them. One day, a farmer was desperately searching for his sheep, and he discovered a green meadow which was covered with neither snow nor ice. He became curious, and walked over to this meadow. When he got there, that’s where he found his sheep. There was also a hut, out of which an old, gray-haired man came. It was Tschei, and he said that the man should take his sheep and never come back. A short time later, a hunter found a hatchet, and everyone said that it must belong to Tschei, and that he had forgotten it when he moved up to the Rose Garden. But one day, an old man came and fetched the hatchet and disappeared into a crack in the mountain.

Today, the Tscheiner Slope is still not completely covered with vegetation. One spot near a crack in the mountain lacks growth.

=== The Glacier Man ===
Giants, dwarfs, and wild men once lived around the Karersee. One day, the wild men found a chest full of gold coins, to which they paid no particular attention. An old man then came and demanded that they give him back the chest. The wild men had taken a few coins out of the chest and refused to given them back, so the old man said that the time would come when the Glacier Man would come and look for them all. But the Glacier Man himself was never to be seen, and after nothing had happened for many years, they all continued to live in peace.

A few years later, the Dirlingers came and settled in the mouths of the Locher Valley. Disputes were constantly breaking out between the Dirlingers and the wild men. But when the Dirlingers demanded the Grunschaft Meadow for themselves, this led to the last and greatest conflict. The wild men had many fearless warriors, but they nonetheless lost the battle.

A few years later, the sole survivor among the wild men, the Glacier Man, searched for his allies, but in vain. But as fate would have it, the Dirlingers didn’t enjoy their victory for long. At first, the rich Dirlingers ones promised the poor ones the best land. But the rich broke their promise, and so one of the poor Dirlingers journeyed to the “Witch’s Cauldron” to call upon the Devil for help in spreading the plague. As a result, everything was torn down and even the most-beautiful meadows soon disappeared into the forest.

=== The Stone Maiden ===
The story goes that this maiden was once a princess. She and all her followers wanted to hurry to the aid of the wild men for the last and greatest battle against the Dirlingers. But as she came to a mountain ridge and saw the terrible defeat of the wild men, she was so shocked that she turned into stone.

=== The Fellow from Marchegg ===
In Gummer, a fellow from Marchegg would traipse around, even in the light of day. He groaned under the burden of stones he was carrying. He asked everyone he met what he should do with this burden, until one day someone answered that he should put it back where he found it. On that day, the enchantment was lifted.

=== The Witch Langwerda ===
Langwerda, also known as “Lomberda,” was a witch who lived in a valley below the Rose Garden. One day, she ordered her servant girl to sweep out the attic with a bundle of wheat stalks. But the servant girl used some pine twigs instead, and a short time later, a storm started brewing. When Lomberda went to see whether the servant girl had done a proper job, she found that the entire attic was full of pine needles. The witch punished the maid, because if she had used a bundle of wheat stalks, as she had been told to do, everything would have been full of grain, instead.

=== The Brothers ===
A king had two sons who traveled to the Rose Garden even in late autumn. The roses still bloomed here, regardless of the season of the year. One of the brothers said that he saw a pale stalk with a rose on it. The two brothers now raced to see who could get it first. The one who had seen it first was not as fast as the other brother. When he finally came to the rose, the slower brother said full of anger that the rose belonged to him, since he had seen it first. The other replied that he had come to it first, so that it was his. After a brief struggle, the brother who had seen the rose first stabbed and killed the other. Since then, no roses grow there anymore.

=== The Little Man ===
The Little Man had discovered blue stone up in the mountains, near the Rose Garden. He marched back and forth from the place to the valley, taking as much of the blue stone with him on each trip as he could. But he didn't keep the stone for himself. Rather, he sold the pieces to a dyer in Bozen who said that it was the most-beautiful blue that he had ever seen. The dyer gave him as much money as the Little Man wanted. Thus, the Little Man could live well – but no one ever found out where he had gotten the blue stone.

=== The Goat ===
A farmer had many goats which he always took to a particular clearing in the forest where they could graze. One day, one of the goats ran into the forest and then soon came out again with half a loaf of bread in its mouth. The farmer wanted to know where the goat had gotten the bread. But when he followed the goat into the forest the next time, the goat ran this way and that, all the way through the forest, and was thus able to fool the farmer. To this day, no one knows where the goat had gotten the half a loaf of bread.

=== The Tailor ===
Behind Welschnofen in the direction of the village of Kar, there was a deep hole in the earth. One day, a tailor came along and saw it. He thought it would be amusing to frighten the devil that lived in the hole. So he pointed his gun into the hole and began shooting until all of his ammunition was gone. In an instant, the devil climbed out of the hole and ran away. But not just one devil came out: A great many small and large devils clambered out of the hole. The tailor ran to the nearest farmhouse and sought refuge there until the devils had gone away.

== See also ==
- Laurin (poem)
