= Nigerpass =

- Location within Alps
- Elevation: 1,688 metres (5,538 ft)

Third Approach
- Location: South Tyrol, Italy
- Range: Dolomites
- Coordinates: 46°27′26″N 11°35′9″E

The Nigerpass (Italian: Passo Nigra; German: Nigerpass) (1688 m) is a high mountain pass in the Dolomites in the province of South Tyrol in Italy.

It connects the Tierser Tal with the Karerpass. The pass lies below the Rosengarten massif and borders on the Schlern Nature Preserve. The pass road was built in 1957 and has a maximum grade of 24%, making it the steepest pass in Italy. It is nevertheless open year-round.

== See also ==
- List of highest paved roads in Europe
- List of mountain passes
