= Karerpass =

- (Passo di Costalunga)
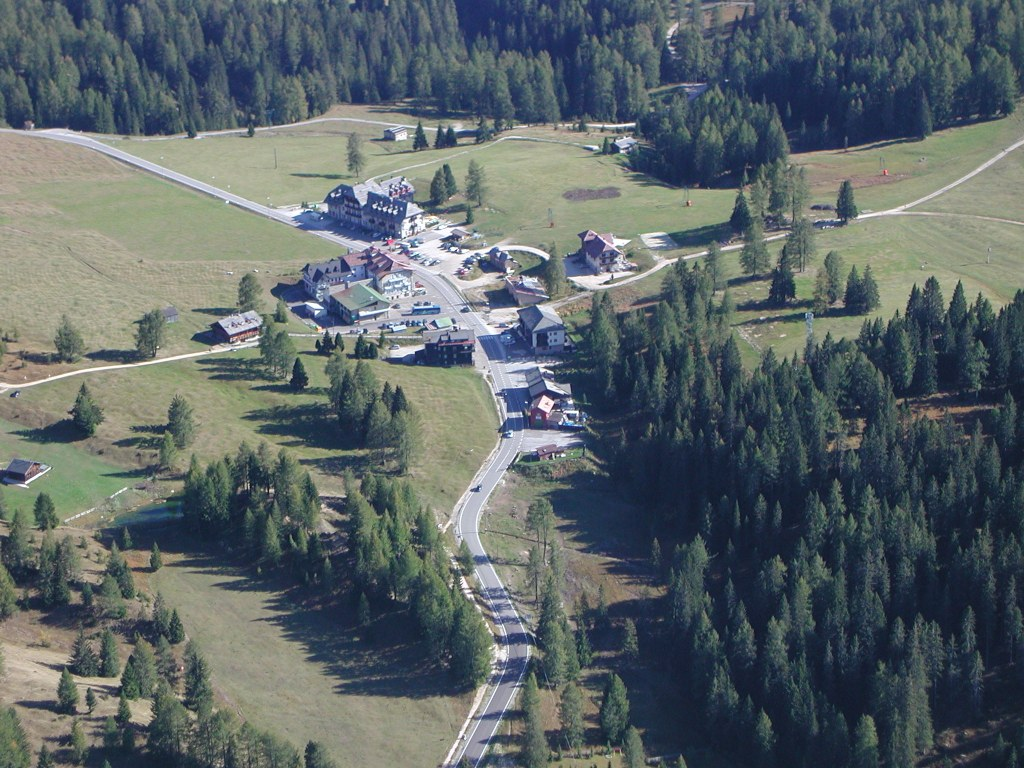
- Karerpass
- Interactive map of Karerpass
- Elevation: 1,745 metres (5,725 ft)

Third Approach
- Location: South Tyrol, Italy
- Coordinates: 46°24′24″N 11°36′25″E

The Karerpass (Italian: Passo di Costalunga; Ladin: Jouf de Ciareja; German: Karerpass) (1745 m) is a high mountain pass in the province of South Tyrol in Italy. It connects Bolzano through the Eggental and the Welschnofen Valley with the Fassa Valley. Just below the pass on the Welschnofen Valley side is the Karersee lake. It is connected to the Tierser Tal by the Nigerpass.

== Climate ==
Climate data for Karerpass: 1616m (1991−2021 normals, extremes 1990−present)
Month	Jan	Feb	Mar	Apr	May	Jun	Jul	Aug	Sep	Oct	Nov	Dec	Year
Record high °C (°F)	8.7 (47.7)	11.2 (52.2)	14.0 (57.2)	17.3 (63.1)	24.0 (75.2)	27.8 (82.0)	27.0 (80.6)	27.1 (80.8)	23.7 (74.7)	16.5 (61.7)	11.0 (51.8)	7.5 (45.5)	27.8 (82.0)
Mean daily maximum °C (°F)	−2.6 (27.3)	−0.3 (31.5)	4.3 (39.7)	7.6 (45.7)	12.2 (54.0)	17.0 (62.6)	19.0 (66.2)	18.3 (64.9)	13.5 (56.3)	7.8 (46.0)	2.1 (35.8)	−2.1 (28.2)	8.1 (46.5)
Daily mean °C (°F)	−6.3 (20.7)	−5.1 (22.8)	−1.0 (30.2)	2.3 (36.1)	6.7 (44.1)	11.2 (52.2)	13.0 (55.4)	12.7 (54.9)	8.5 (47.3)	3.8 (38.8)	−1.2 (29.8)	−5.5 (22.1)	3.3 (37.9)
Mean daily minimum °C (°F)	−10.0 (14.0)	−9.8 (14.4)	−6.3 (20.7)	−3.0 (26.6)	1.2 (34.2)	5.4 (41.7)	7.0 (44.6)	7.1 (44.8)	3.5 (38.3)	−0.3 (31.5)	−4.4 (24.1)	−8.8 (16.2)	−1.5 (29.3)
Record low °C (°F)	−20.9 (−5.6)	−23.5 (−10.3)	−24.5 (−12.1)	−19.1 (−2.4)	−10.5 (13.1)	−5.7 (21.7)	−2.0 (28.4)	−2.0 (28.4)	−6.0 (21.2)	−16.3 (2.7)	−18.3 (−0.9)	−24.0 (−11.2)	−24.5 (−12.1)
Average precipitation mm (inches)	41.3 (1.63)	37.3 (1.47)	57.4 (2.26)	94.4 (3.72)	136.8 (5.39)	150.0 (5.91)	164.9 (6.49)	161.3 (6.35)	117.5 (4.63)	144.5 (5.69)	146.1 (5.75)	68.0 (2.68)	1,319.5 (51.97)
Average precipitation days (≥ 1.0 mm)	5.1	5.4	6.5	10.2	13.7	13.3	12.2	12.3	9.6	9.3	9.0	6.3	112.9
Source: Landeswetterdienst Südtirol

== See also ==
- List of highest paved roads in Europe
- List of mountain passes
