= Gran Cront =

Mountain in Italy

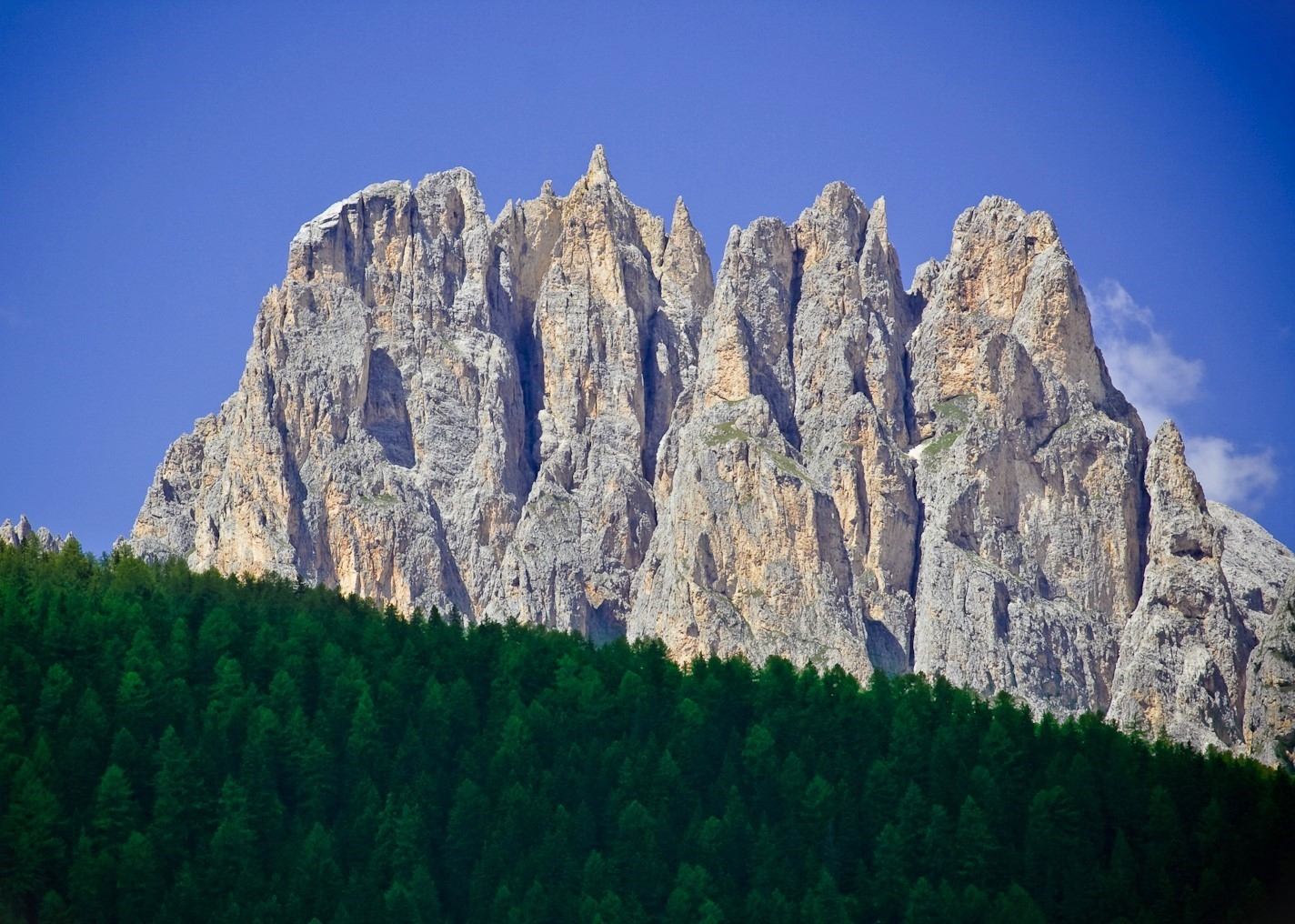
- Southeast aspect

Highest point
- Elevation: 2,782 m (9,127 ft)
- Prominence: 193 m (633 ft)
- Parent peak: Kesselkogel
- Isolation: 1.17 km (0.73 mi)
- Coordinates: 46°27′13″N 11°39′10″E

Geography
- Location within Italy Location within Alps
- Interactive map of Gran Cront
- Country: Italy
- Province: Trentino
- Protected area: Dolomites World Heritage Site
- Parent range: Dolomites; Rosengarten group
- Topo map: Tabacco 29 Val di Fassa e Dolomiti Settentrionali

Geology
- Rock age: Triassic
- Rock type: Dolomite

Climbing
- First ascent: 1881 or 1882

Gran Cront is a mountain in the province of Trentino in northern Italy.

== Description ==
Gran Cront is a 2,782-meter-elevation (9,127-foot) summit in the Rosengarten group of the Dolomites, and as part of the Dolomites is a UNESCO World Heritage site. Set in the Trentino-Alto Adige/Südtirol region, the peak is located three kilometers (1.86 miles) west-northwest of the hamlet of Pera. Precipitation runoff from the mountain drains into tributaries of the Avisio. Topographic relief is significant as the summit rises 1,020 meters (3,346 feet) above Val di Vajolet in one kilometer (0.6 mile). The nearest higher neighbor is Cima Scalieret, 1.25 kilometers (0.77 mile) to the north-northwest. The first ascent of Gran Cront was made on August 13, 1881, by John Stafford Anderson, Giuseppe Ghedina, and Santo Siorpaes. However, another source reports the date as August 13, 1882. The second ascent was made on September 8, 1884, by Giorgio Bernard and Carlo Candelpergher. The mountain's toponym of uncertain origin combines the Italian word "Gran" meaning great or big, with the Ladin "Cront" meaning wall or steep rock.

== Climate ==
Based on the Köppen climate classification, Gran Cront is located in an alpine climate zone with long, cold winters, and short, mild summers. Weather systems are forced upwards by the mountains (orographic lift), causing moisture to drop in the form of rain and snow. The months of June through September offer the most favorable weather for visiting or climbing in this area.

== Gallery ==
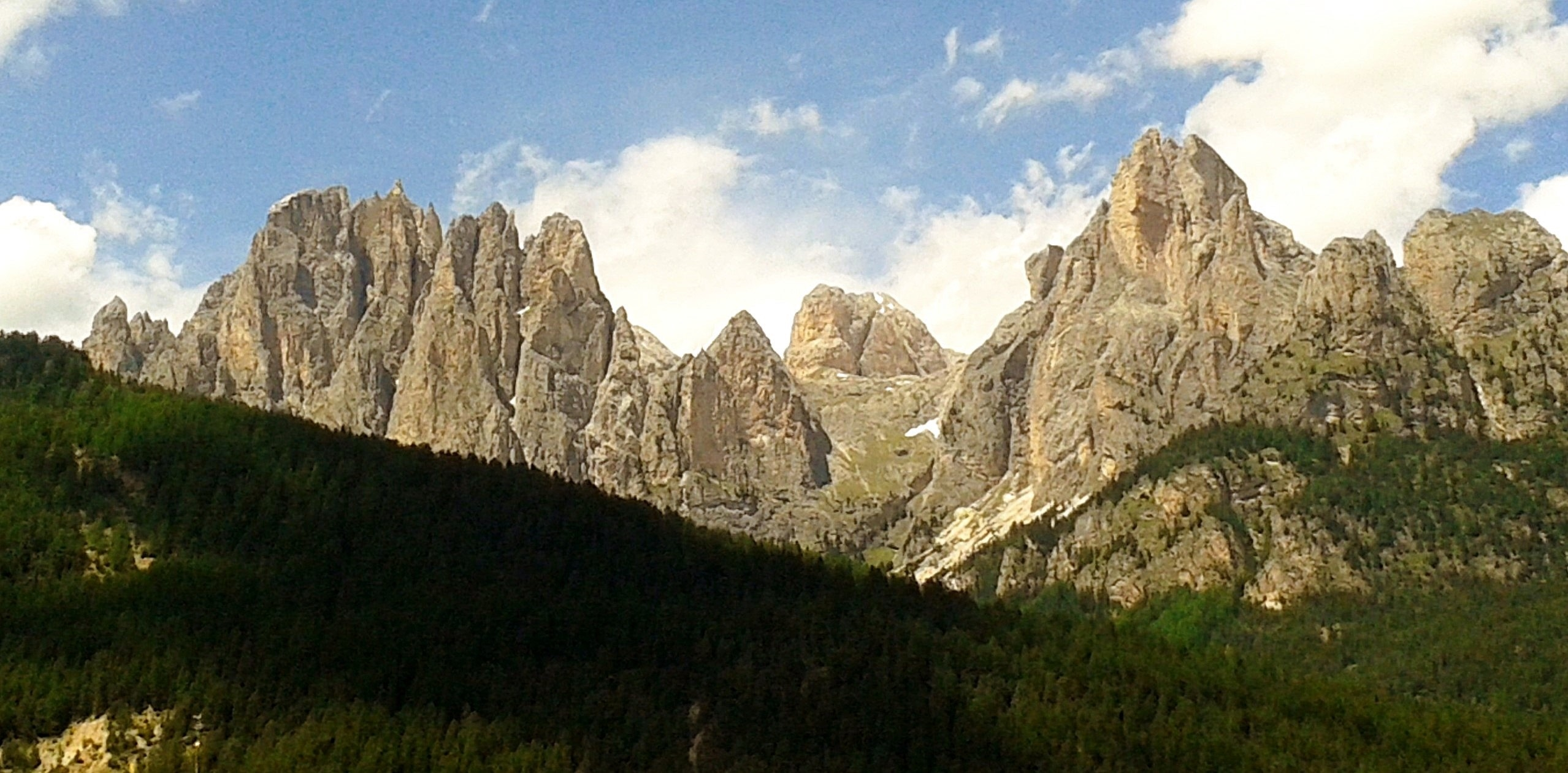
Gran Cront (left) and Torre Rizzi (2,485 m) to right

== See also ==
- Southern Limestone Alps
