= Rosengartenspitze =

Mountain in Italy

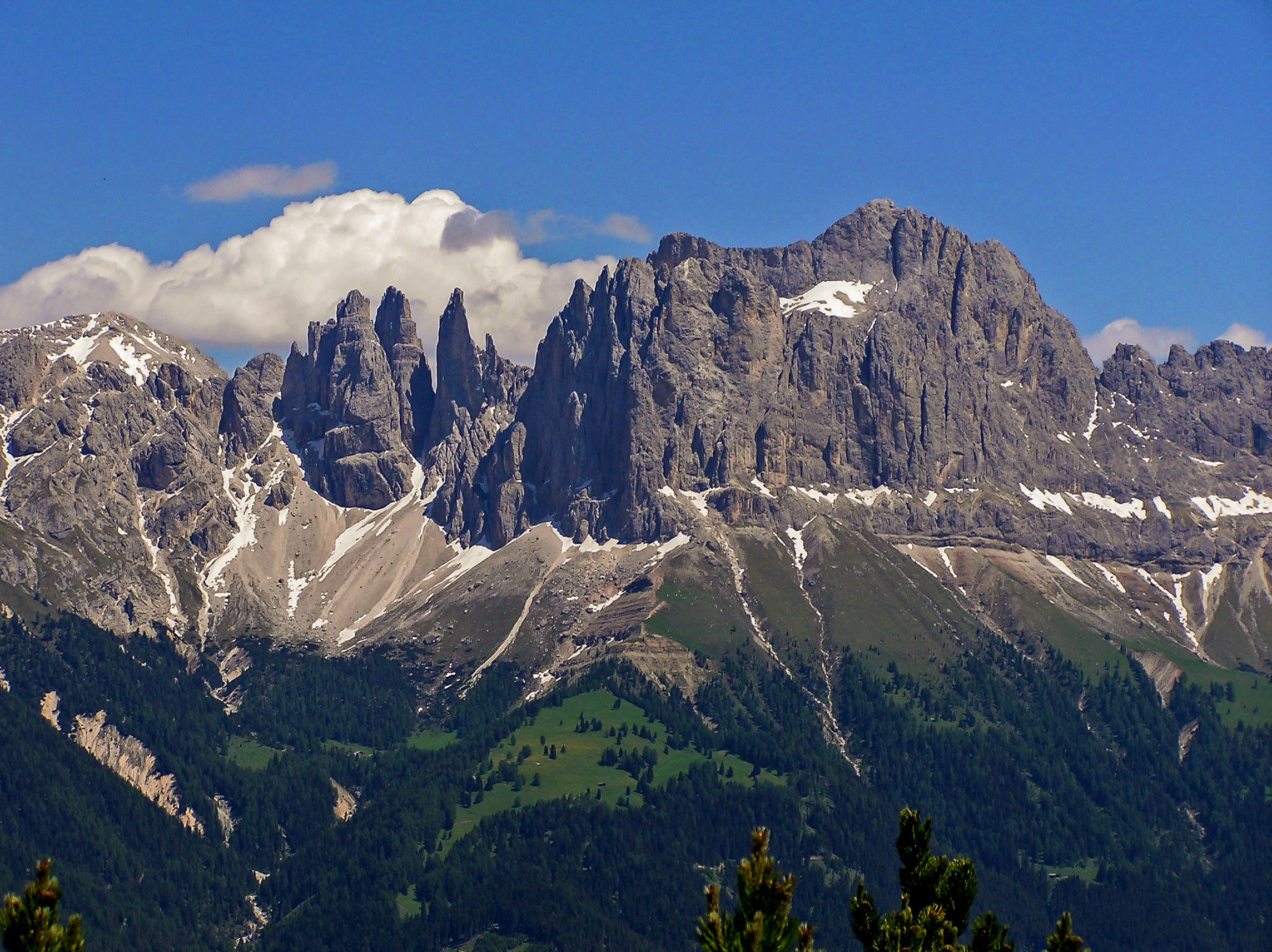

Highest point
- Elevation: 2,981 m (9,780 ft)
- Prominence: 425 m (1,394 ft)
- Listing: Alpine mountains 2500–2999 m
- Coordinates: 46°27′18″N 11°37′15″E

Geography
- Location within Alps
- Location: South Tyrol, Italy
- Parent range: Dolomites

Climbing
- First ascent: 31 August 1874 by Charles Comyns Tucker and T.H. Carson

The Rosengartenspitze (Italian Cima Catinaccio, Ladin Ciadenac) is a mountain in the Dolomites in South Tyrol, Italy.

== See also ==
- Kesselkogel
- Rosengarten group
