= Rosengarten group =

Massif in the Dolomites of northern Italy

Rosengarten
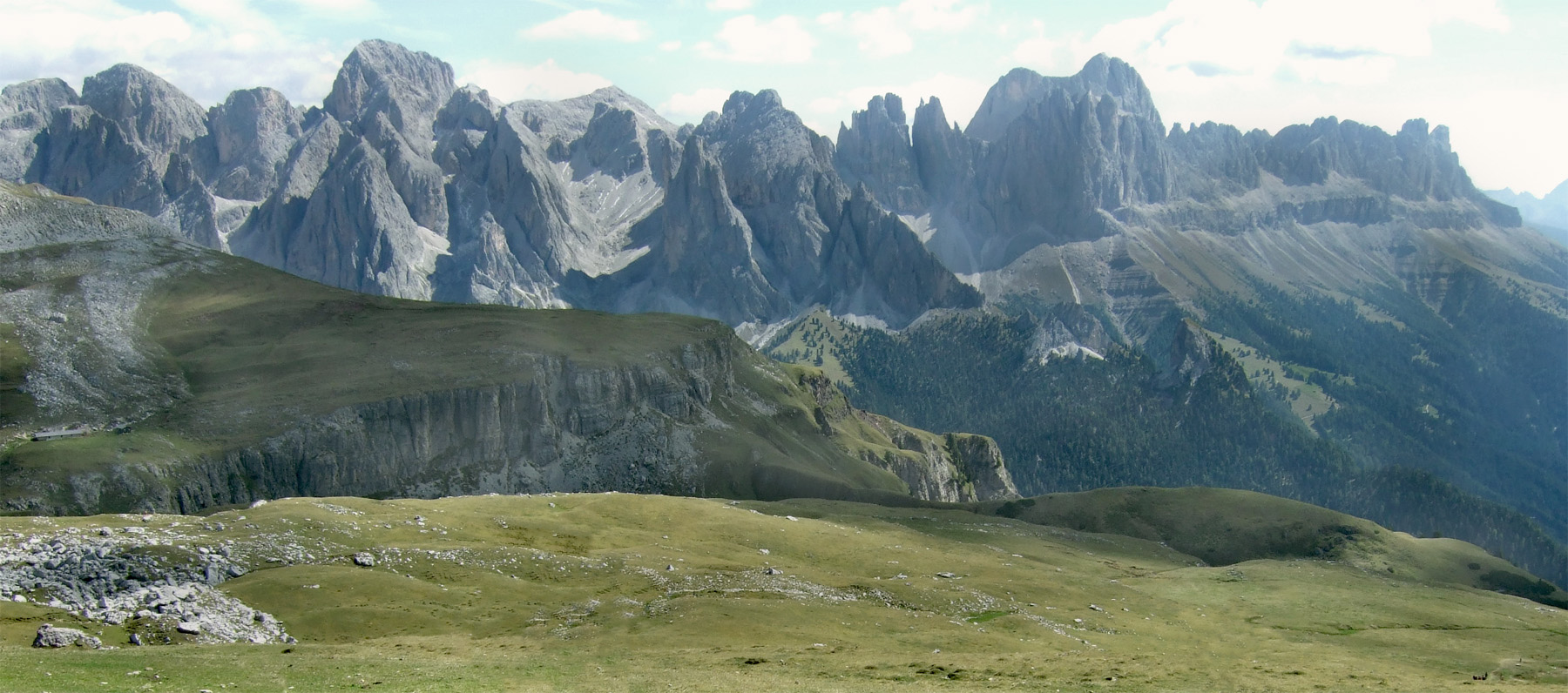
- Rosengarten seen from Schlern summit

Highest point
- Elevation: 3,002 m (9,849 ft)
- Coordinates: 46°28′N 11°39′E

Naming
- English translation: Rose garden
- Language of name: German

Geography
- Location: Trentino-Alto Adige/Südtirol, Italy
- Parent range: Dolomites

Climbing
- First ascent: 1873

The Rosengarten group (Italian: Catinaccio [katiˈnattʃo], Ladin: Ciadenac, Ciadenáze) is a massif in the Dolomites of northern Italy. It is located between the Tierser Tal and Eggental in South Tyrol and the Fassa Valley in Trentino.

One peculiarity of the Rosengarten is the pink shade, owing to the presence of the mineral dolomite, which takes in the sunset and "glows", as celebrated in the Bozner Bergsteigerlied. Meaning "Rose garden" in German, the name refers to the legend of King Laurin and his Rose Garden, a traditional story explaining the outer appearance of the mountain range.

== Summits ==
The highest peak is the Kesselkogel at 3,002 m (9,849 ft) above sea level. Other peaks include:

- Rosengartenspitze - 2,981 m (9,780 ft)
- Vajolet Towers - 2,813 m (9,229 ft)
- Laurinswand (Croda di Re Laurino) - 2,813 m (9,229 ft)
- Tscheiner-Spitze (Cima Sforcella) - 2,813 m (9,229 ft)
- Rotwand (Roda di Vaèl) - 2,806 m (9,206 ft)
- Gran Cront - 2,782 m (9,127 ft)
- Teufelswand (Croda Davoi) - 2,727 m (8,947 ft)
