= Bozner Bergsteigerlied =

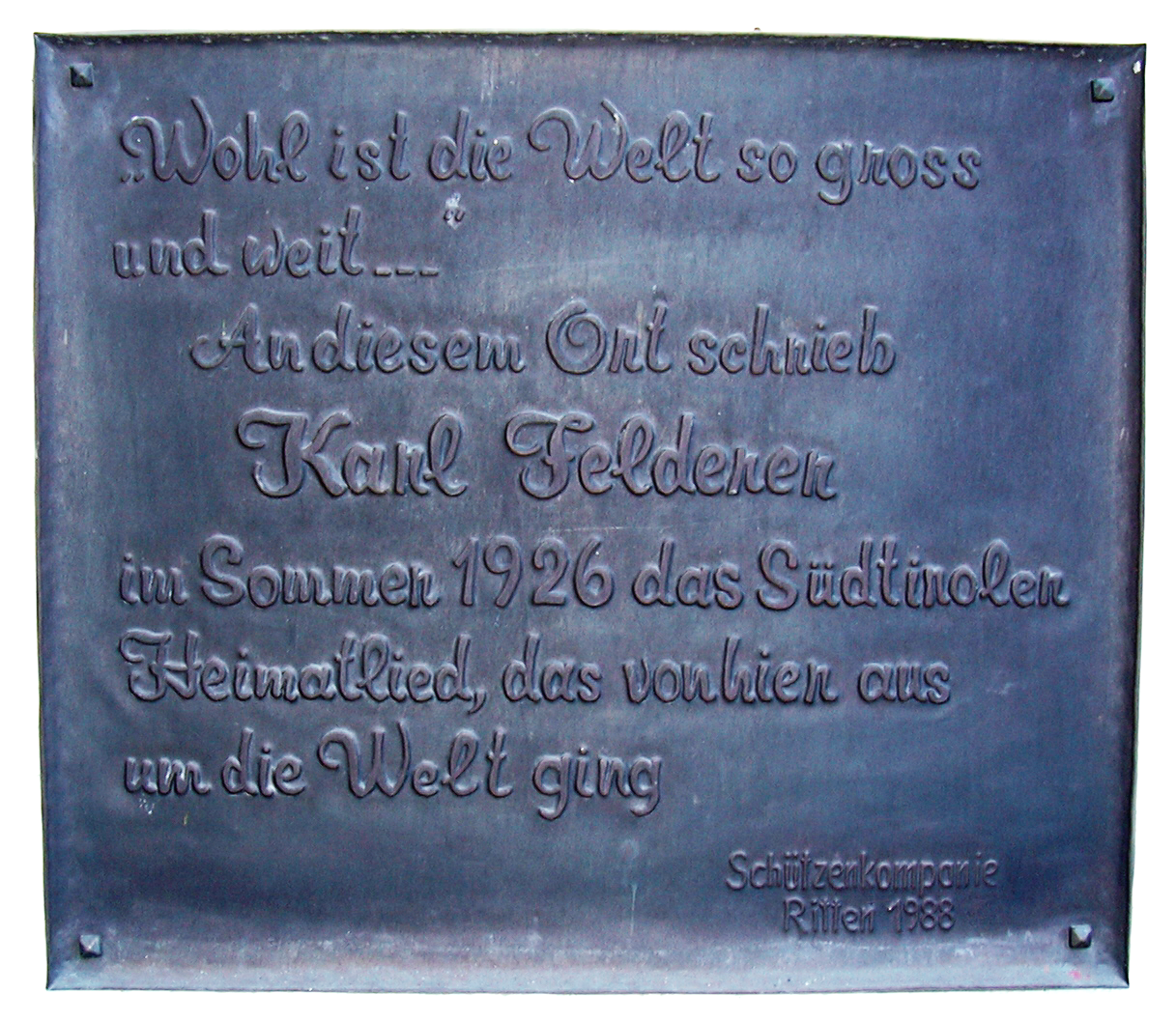

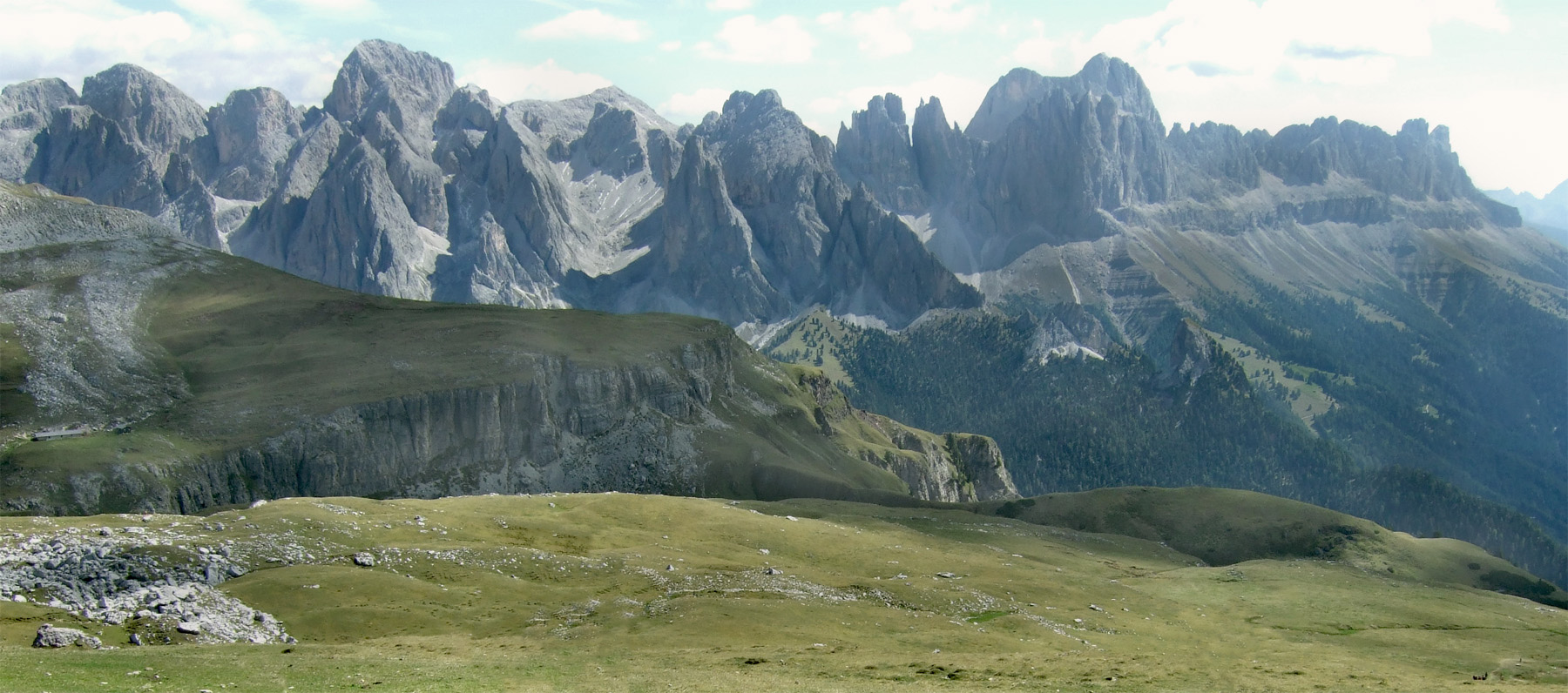
The Rosengarten group, one of South Tyrol's landmarks celebrated in the Bozner Bergsteigerlied

The Bozner Bergsteigerlied (English: Bozen mountaineer song) is one of the two unofficial hymns of the South Tyroleans, the other being the Andreas-Hofer-Lied. Its lyrics were composed in 1926 by Karl Felderer in Moos am Ritten to the melody of an old Tyrolean craftsmen's song.

At the time of its composition, the Italianization of South Tyrol campaign of the Italian fascists had reached its height, effecting a prohibition of all names related to "Südtirol" and "Deutsch-Südtirol". Therefore, the lyrics never mention South Tyrol directly, referring instead to its geographical extension.

In the first verse, its north–south extension is described by the way of the Eisack source and the Salurner Klause, a bottleneck which used to mark the border between the German and Italian-speaking area. The West–East extension is characterized by the mountain Ortler and the Sexten Dolomites. In the following verses, various landmarks of South Tyrol such as the Schlern and the Rosengarten group are celebrated.

== See also ==
- Prontuario dei nomi locali dell'Alto Adige

== Literature ==
- Kommt zum Singen – Südtiroler Liederbuch (South Tyrolean Songbook), Bozen, Athesia, 1986. ISBN 88-7014-343-0
