= Schlern =

Mountain in Italy

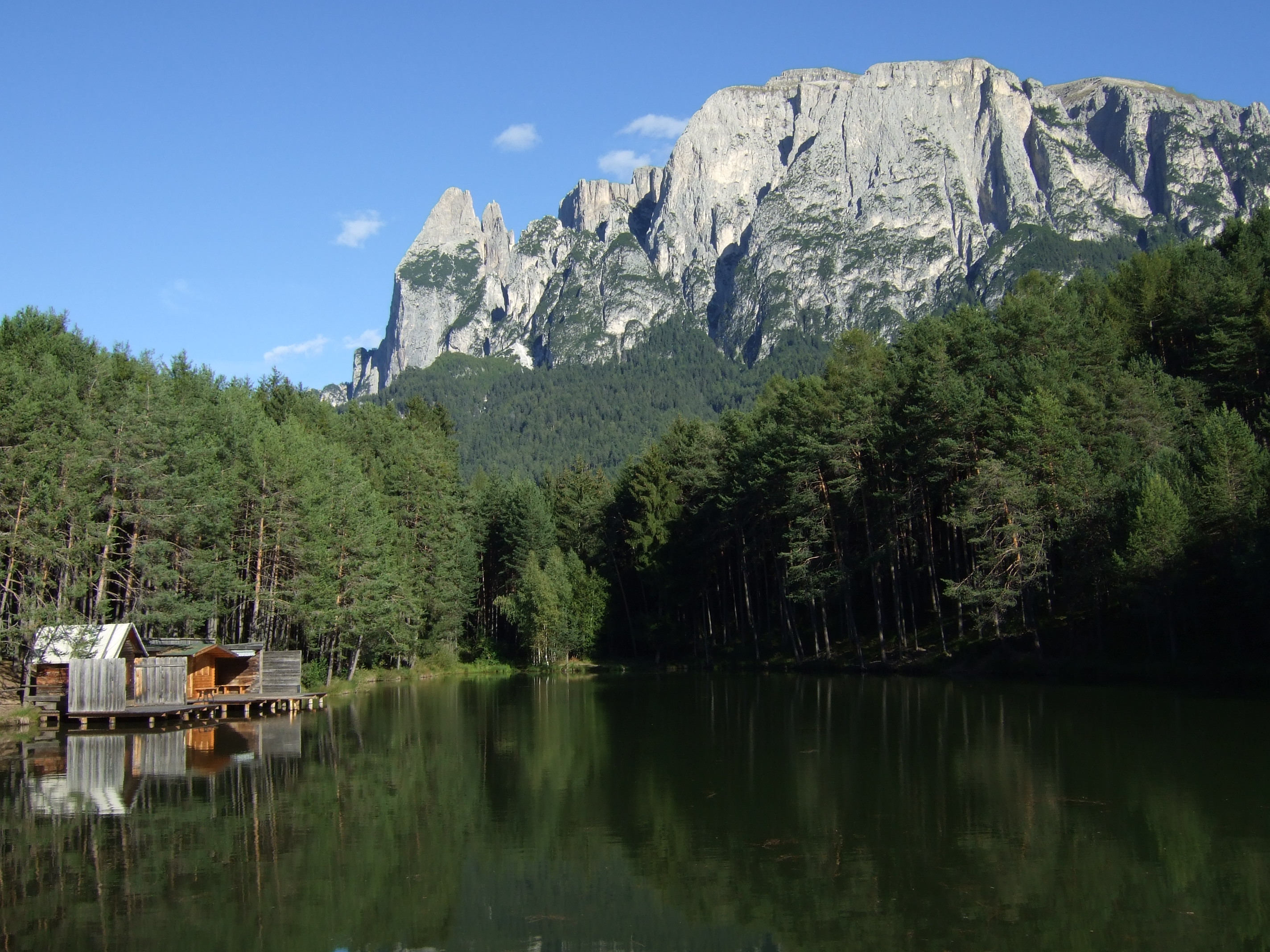
- Schlern

Highest point
- Elevation: 2,563 m (8,409 ft)
- Coordinates: 46°30′54″N 11°34′32″E

Geography
- Location within Alps
- Location: Italy
- Parent range: Dolomites

The Schlern (Austrian German: [ʃlɛrn]; Italian: Sciliar [ʃiˈljar]; Ladin: Sciliër; 2,563 m) is a mountain of the Dolomites in South Tyrol, Italy. The peak at the north west end of the mountain (left, in the image at right) was first ascended in July 1880 by Johann Santner. It is named the Santner Spitze in his honour.

The Schlern dominates the villages of Seis am Schlern and Völs am Schlern, and the summit can be reached following the circular route marked with the number 1 from both villages.

At 1,700 metres (5,577 ft), there is the Schlernboden inn and on the summit plateau is the Schlernhaus inn 2,457 metres (8,061 ft), both open from 1 June to 15 October. The highest summit is the Petz with 2,564 metres (8,412 ft).

The Schlern is sung of in the Bozner Bergsteigerlied as one of South Tyrol's landmarks. Its characteristic profile appears on the Der Schlern - Zeitschrift für Südtiroler Landeskunde (Magazine for South Tyrolean Regional Studies) and the logo pressed into Loacker's wafer biscuits.

== Toponymy ==
The etymology of the mount probably predates Germanic and even Roman times, from a common Old European root *sala ("stream, ditch, canal, etc.", from the locale around it). The name was borrowed and Germanized over centuries (and to this day, a Bavarian dialect variant is written with the initial palatized Sch-, but the original S-). However, a Proto-Indo-European root *skel ("to cut", referring to the cliffside geology) has also been proposed.

== Gallery ==
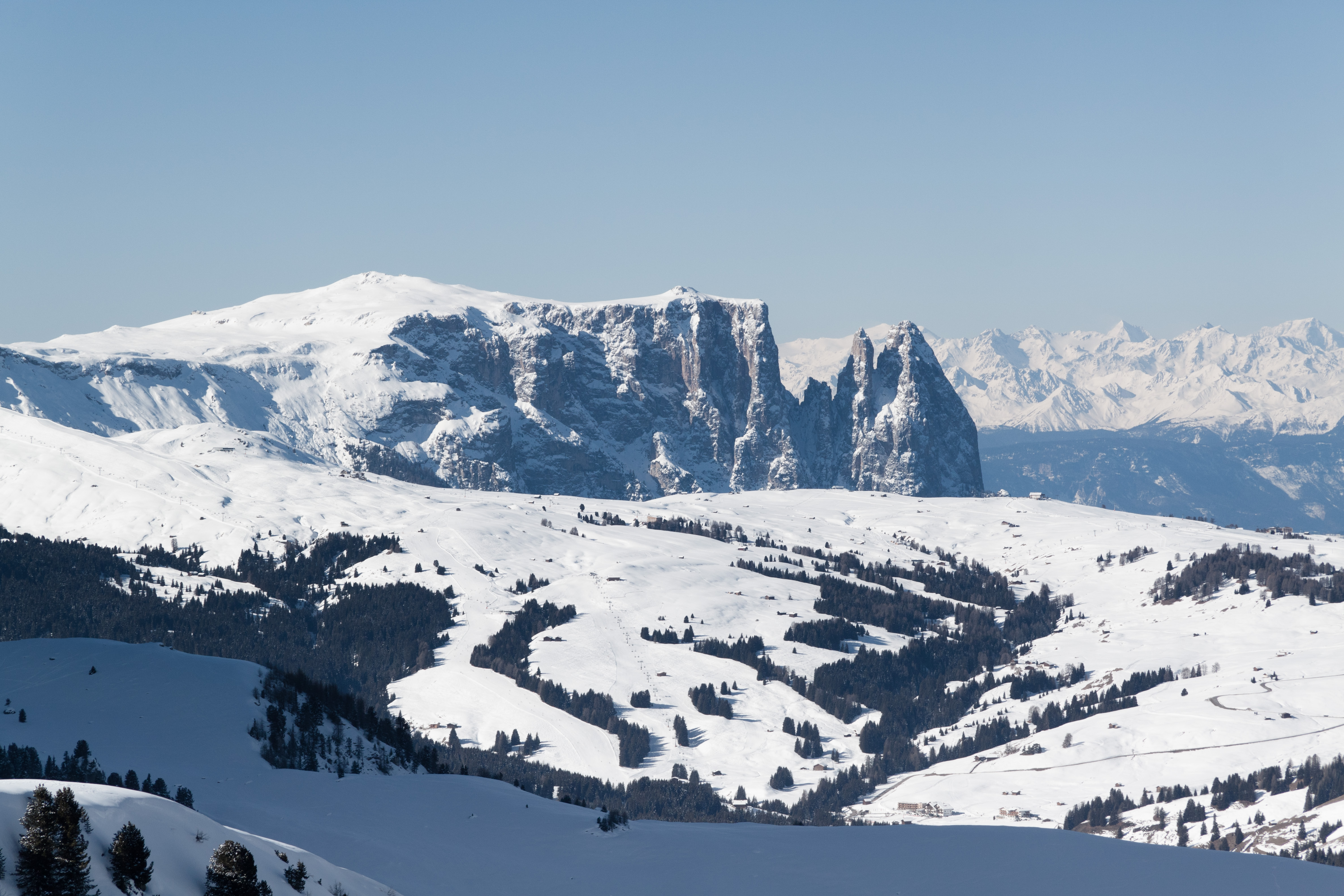

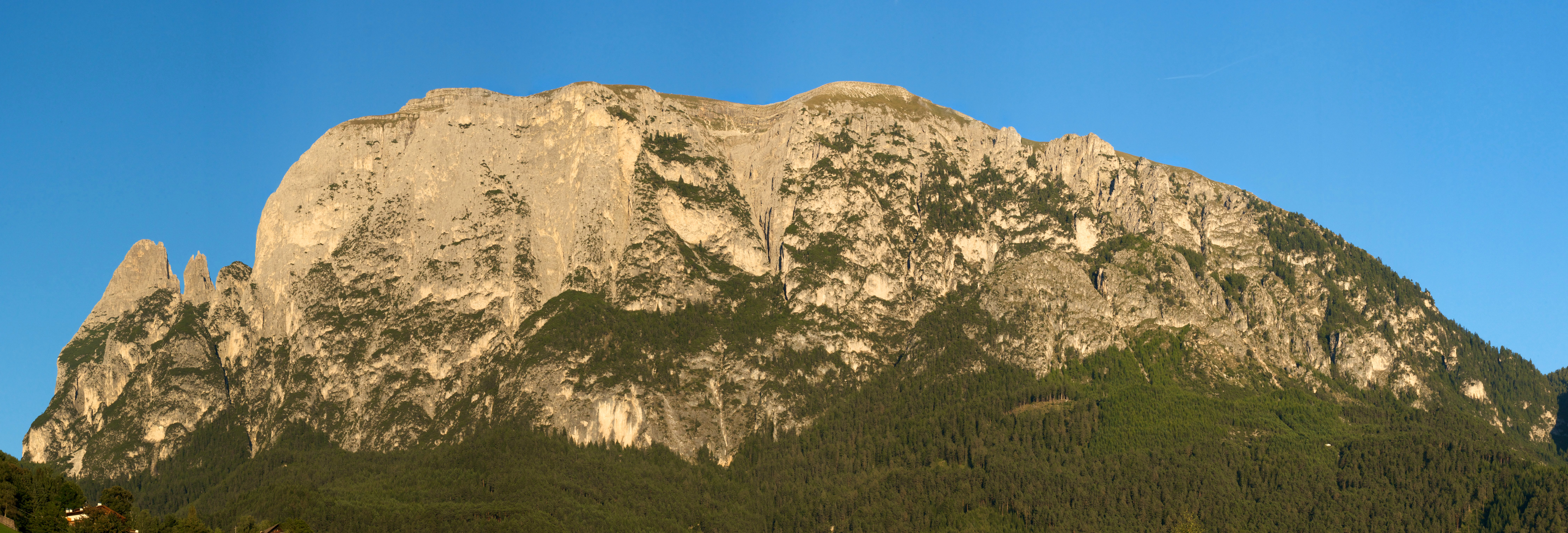

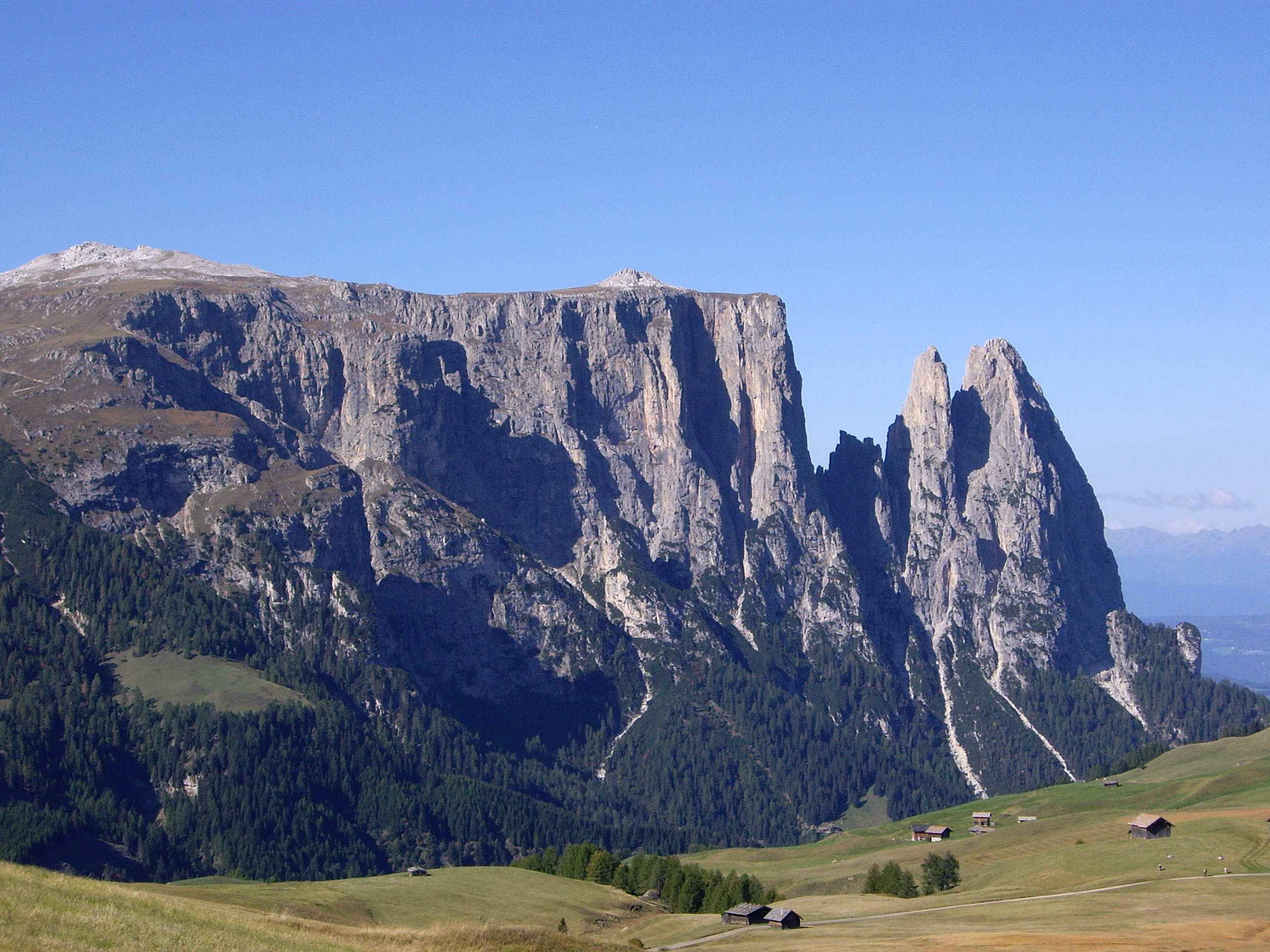

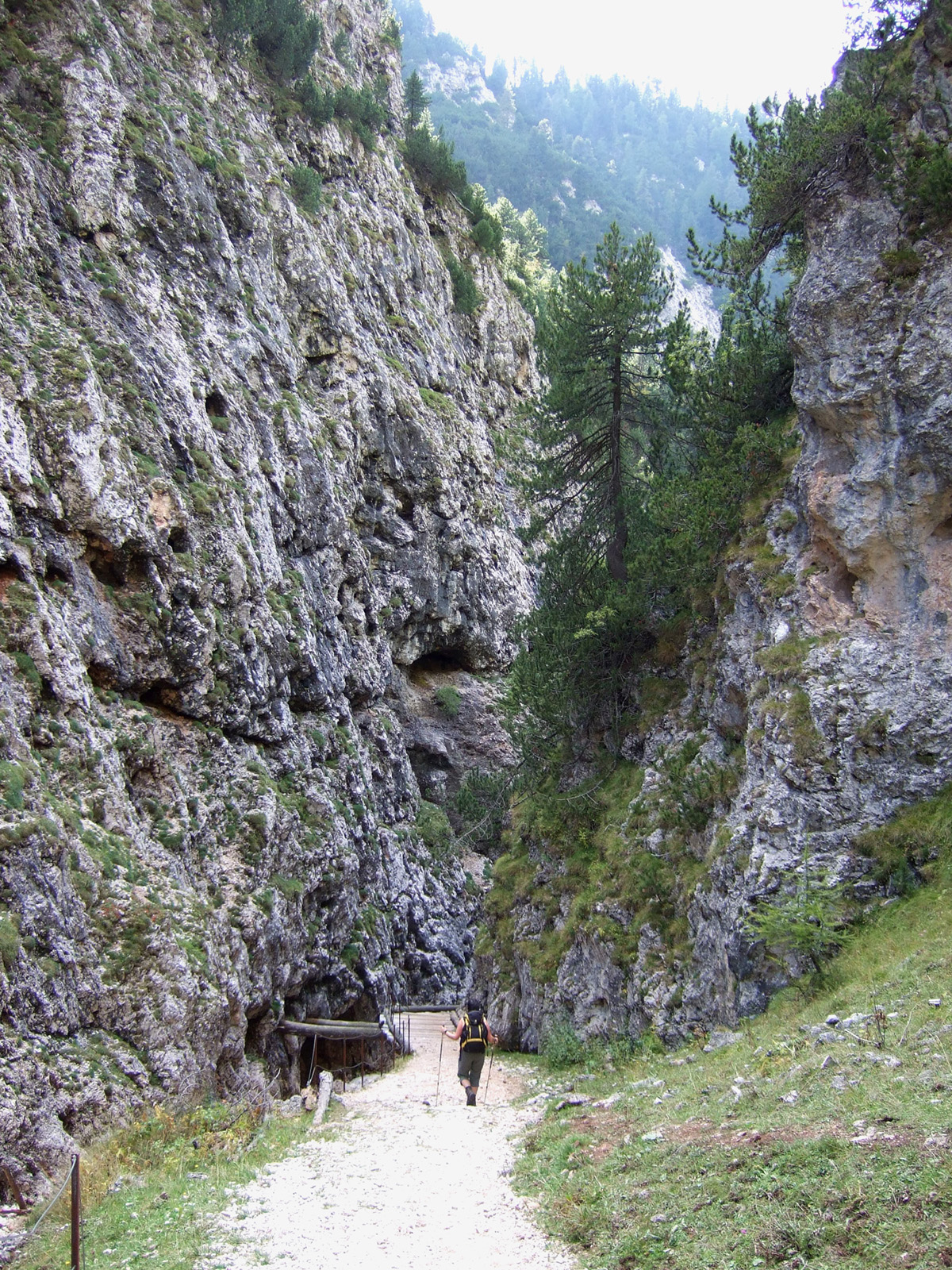
The southern summit approach
