= Latemar =

Mountain in Italy

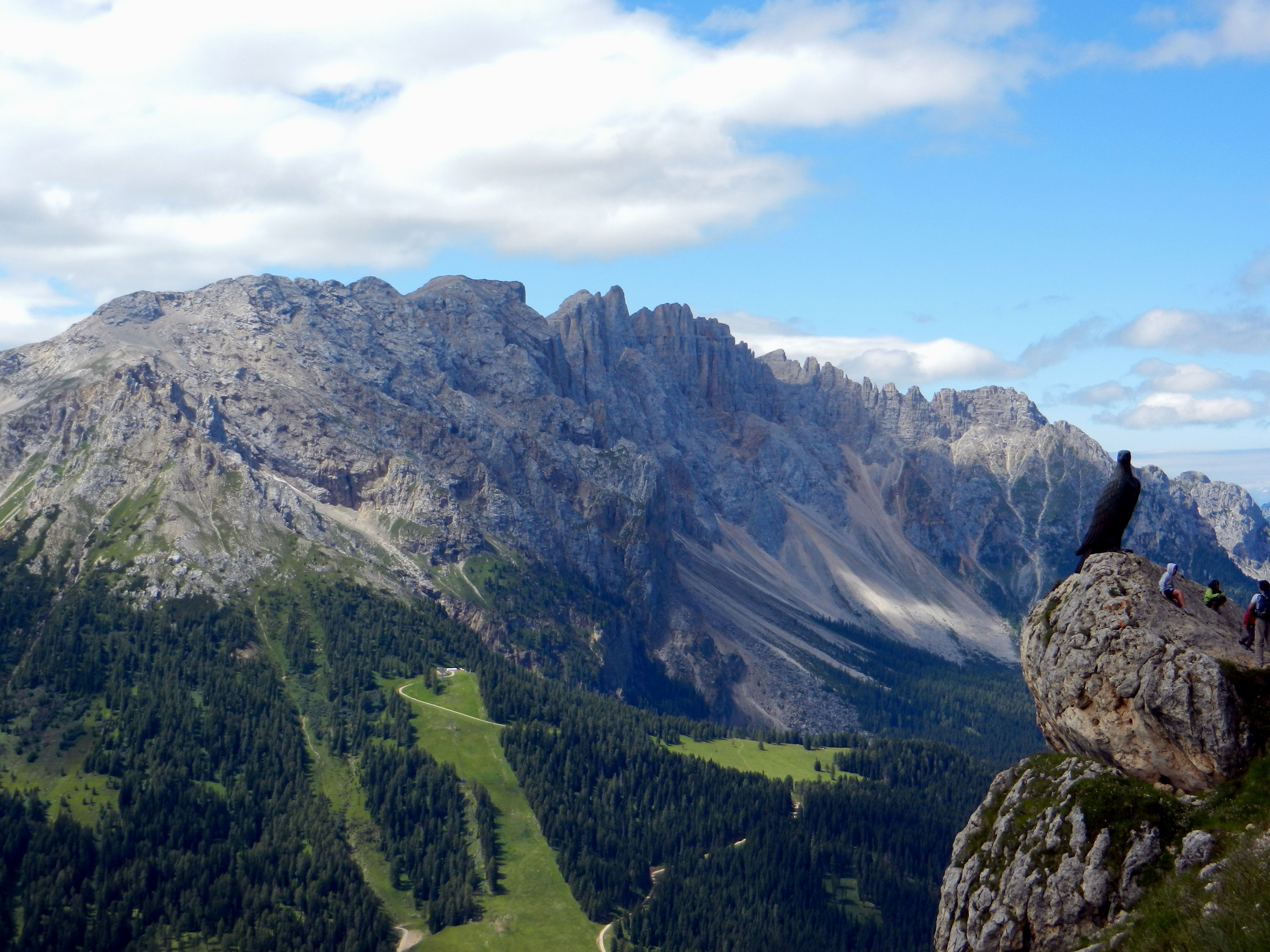
- Latemar

Highest point
- Elevation: 2,842 m (9,324 ft)
- Prominence: 1,097 m (3,599 ft)
- Coordinates: 46°22′0″N 11°34′0″E

Geography
- Location within Alps
- Location: South Tyrol / Trentino (both Italy)
- Parent range: Dolomites

The Latemar is a mountain in the Dolomites on the border between South Tyrol and Trentino, Italy. It is a popular hiking destination. It is best known for its view from the Karersee lake.
