= Kesselkogel =

Mountain in Italy

- Catinaccio d' Antermoia
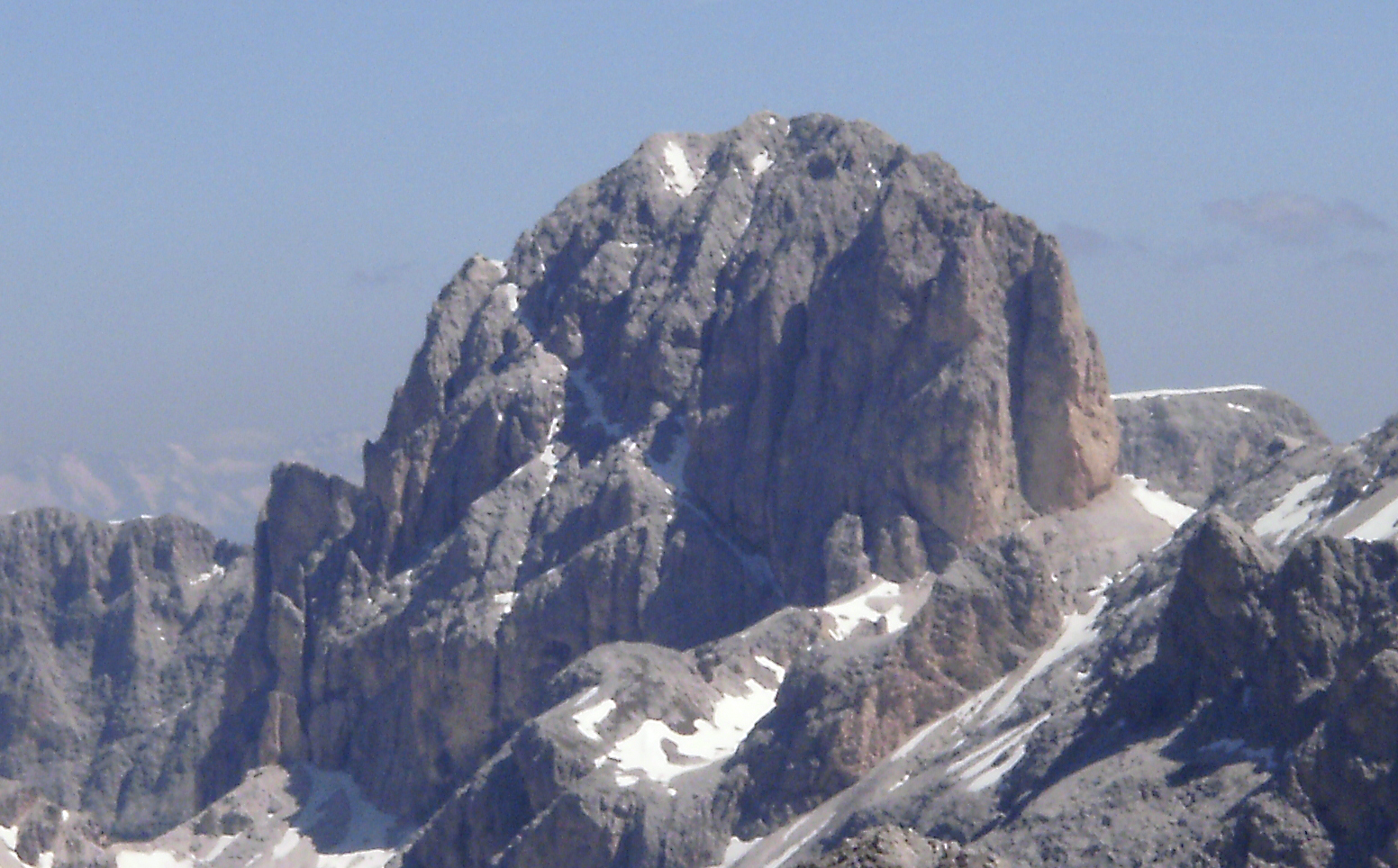
- Kesselkogel SSW

Highest point
- Elevation: 3,002 m (9,849 ft)
- Prominence: 814m
- Listing: Alpine mountains above 3000 m
- Coordinates: 46°28′27″N 11°38′37″E

Geography
- Location within Alps
- Location: South Tyrol, Italy
- Parent range: Dolomites

Climbing
- First ascent: 1873 by C. Comyn Tucker, T.H. Carson, A. Bernard

The Kesselkogel (Italian: Catinaccio d'Antermoia) is the highest mountain of the Rosengarten group in the Dolomites in South Tyrol, Italy.

== Climbing routes ==
The peak falls on all four sides with near vertical walls, although the ledges between the rocks allow it to be climbed. It is a popular peak to climb during the summer thanks to its summit view, which on a clear day takes in all of the famous Dolomitic peaks to the east, and the Brenta Group and Ortler Alps can be seen in the northeast.

There are two vie ferrate on the east and west faces that allow less experienced mountaineers to reach the summit. Even though this climb is graded easy to medium difficulty (A/B), it requires proper gear and a helmet for safety. The summit ridge includes some exposed and unprotected sections.

== Climbing history ==
It was first climbed in 1873.
