= Welschnofen =

- Comune
- Gemeinde Welschnofen; Comune di Nova Levante
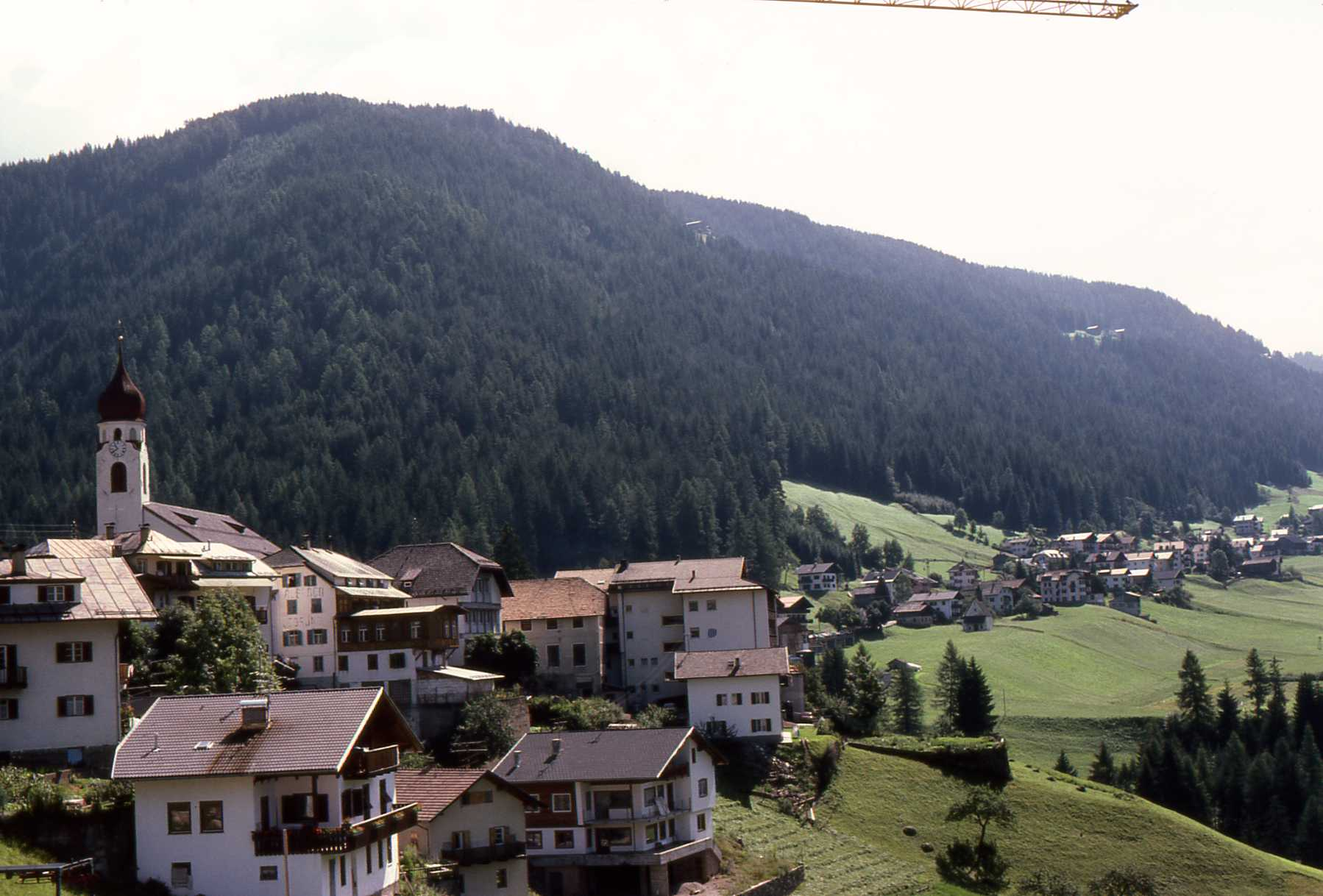
- View of Welschnofen

- Location within Italy Location within Trentino-Alto Adige/Südtirol
- Coordinates: 46°26′N 11°33′E
- Country: Italy
- Region: Trentino-Alto Adige/Südtirol
- Province: South Tyrol (BZ)

Government
  - Mayor: Thomas Pardeller

Area
  - Total: 50.8 km^{2} (19.6 sq mi)
- Elevation: 1,182 m (3,878 ft)

Population (31 March 2017)
  - Total: 1,945
  - Density: 38.3/km^{2} (99.2/sq mi)
- Demonym(s): German: Welschnofner; Italian: novalevantini
- Time zone: UTC+1 (CET)
  - Summer (DST): UTC+2 (CEST)
- Postal code: 39056
- Dialing code: 0471
- Website: Official website

Welschnofen (German: [vɛlʃn̩ˈoːfn̩]; Italian: Nova Levante [ˈnɔːva leˈvante]) is a comune (municipality) in the autonomous province of South Tyrol in northern Italy, located about 15 kilometres (9 mi) southeast of the city of Bolzano.

== History ==
=== Coat of arms ===
The escutcheon is party per quarterly: the 1st and the 4th represent an or rampant lion on sable, the arms of the Judge Bartlmä von Pretzenberg which has had an estate in the municipality. In the 2nd and 3rd quarter an azure mountain is surmounted by an argent pretzels on gules. The emblem was adopted in 1967.

== Geography ==
As of November 30, 2010, it had a population of 1,910 and an area of 50.8 square kilometres (19.6 mi^{2}).

The municipality includes the village of Karersee, named after the nearby alpine lake by the same name, Karersee.

Welschnofen borders the following municipalities: Karneid, Moena, Deutschnofen, Predazzo, Sèn Jan di Fassa and Tiers.

== Society ==
According to the 2024 census, 91.03% of the population speak German, 8.33% Italian and 0.63% Ladin as first language.
