= Karersee =

Mountain lake in South Tyrol, Italy

Lake Karersee
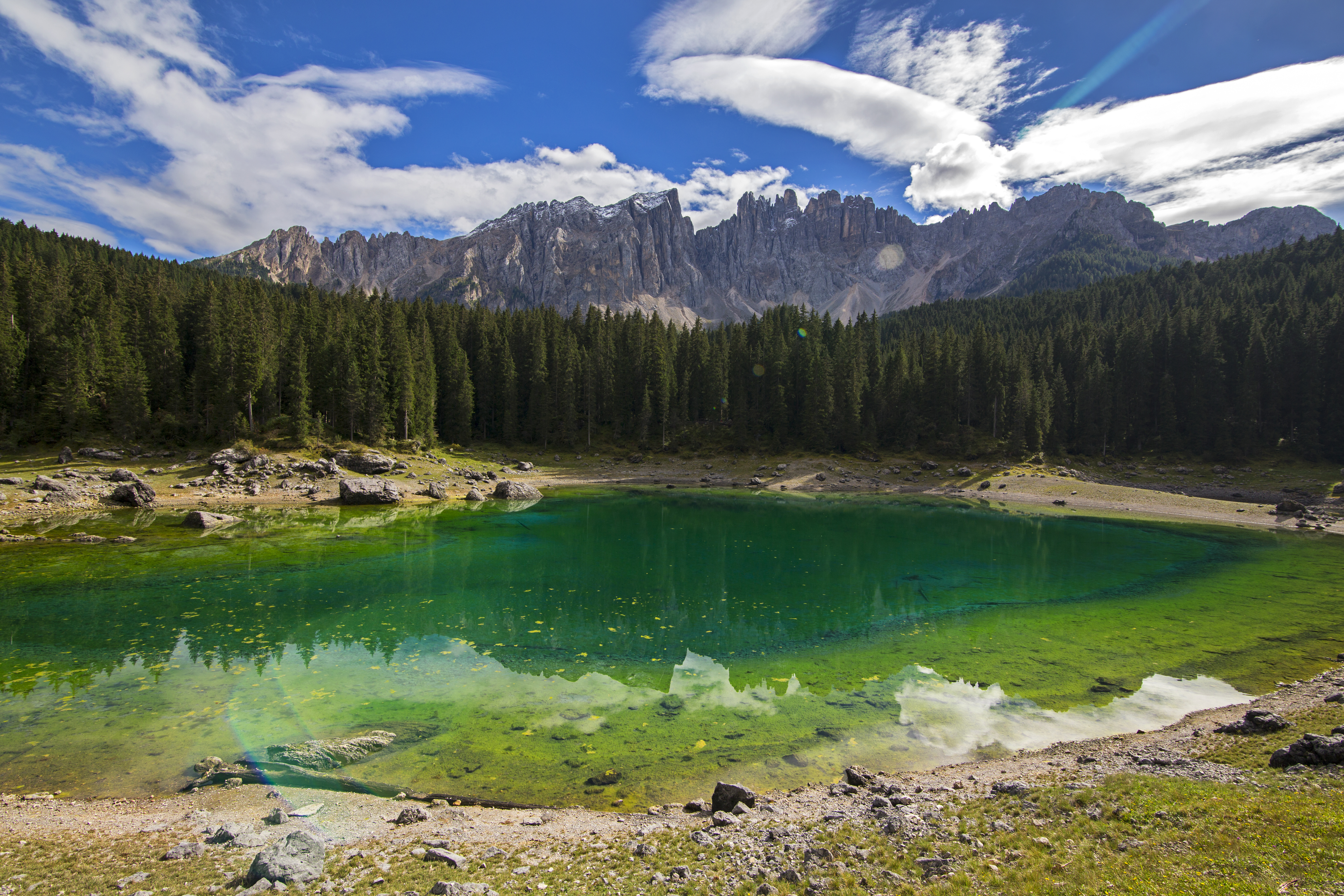
- View on the lake with the Latemar range in the background.

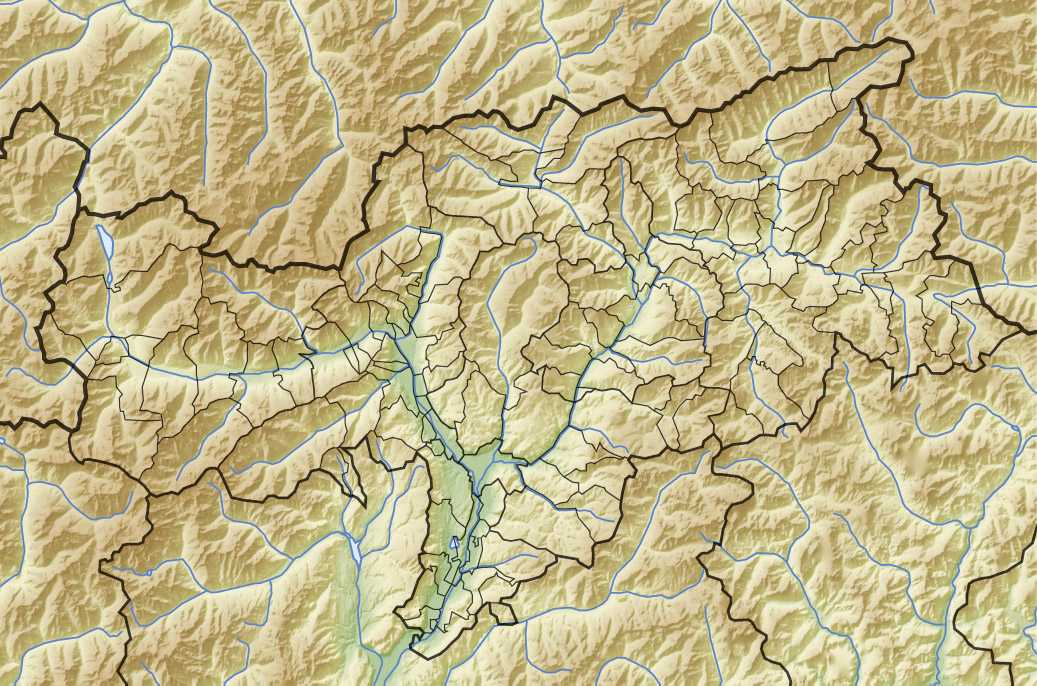
- Location within South Tyrol
- Location: South Tyrol
- Coordinates: 46°24′33″N 11°34′30″E
- Catchment area: 5.81 km^{2} (2.24 sq mi)
- Basin countries: Italy
- Max. length: 0.3 km (0.19 mi)
- Max. width: 0.14 km (0.087 mi)
- Surface area: c. 3.5 ha (8.6 acres)
- Average depth: 17 m (56 ft)
- Max. depth: 17 m (56 ft)
- Surface elevation: 1,519 m (4,984 ft)
- Settlements: Carezza, Welschnofen

Lake Karersee (Italian: Lago di Carezza; German: Karersee) is a small alpine lake in the Dolomites in South Tyrol, Italy. It is known for its wonderful colors and its view of the Latemar mountain range.

== Characterization ==
The name of the lake derives from "Caricaceae", a family of plants with broad lobed leaves.

The lake is located in the western Dolomites on the edge of the Latemarwald, just 20 kilometers southeast of Bolzano at 1520 m altitude in the municipality Welschnofen. The nearest settlement is Karersee-Carezza. The roughly 300 m long and 140 m wide stretch of water is fed by underground springs from the Latemar mountain range.

Today the lake is one of the classic tourist destinations of the Trentino-Alto Adige. In the winter, it is visited by divers who record documentaries of the colors of the underground waters. The small mountain lake is famous for its calm waters, of dark green color, and the panorama of mountains in the background.

== Gallery ==
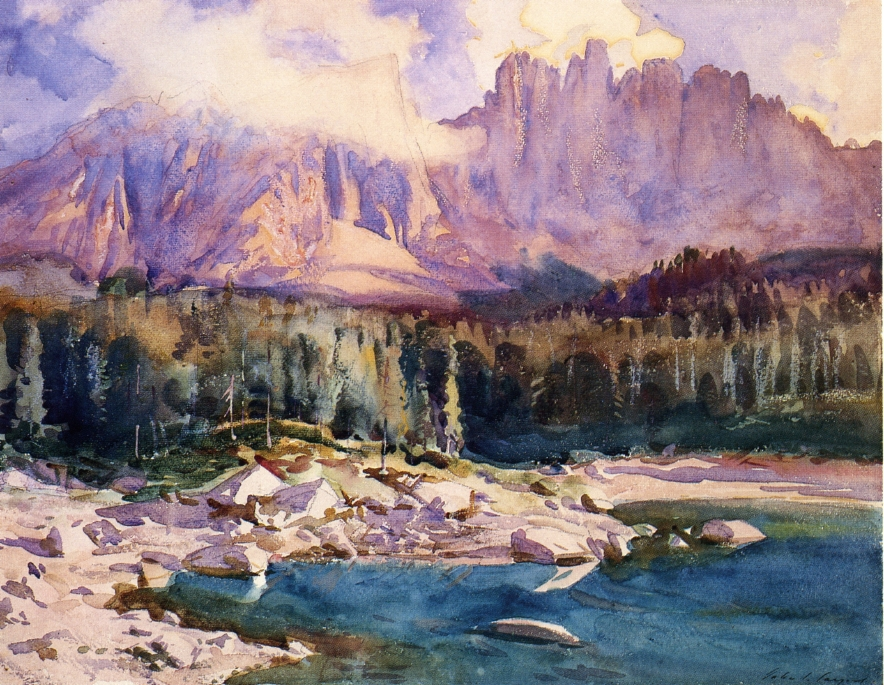
John Singer Sargent, Karer See, 1914, watercolor

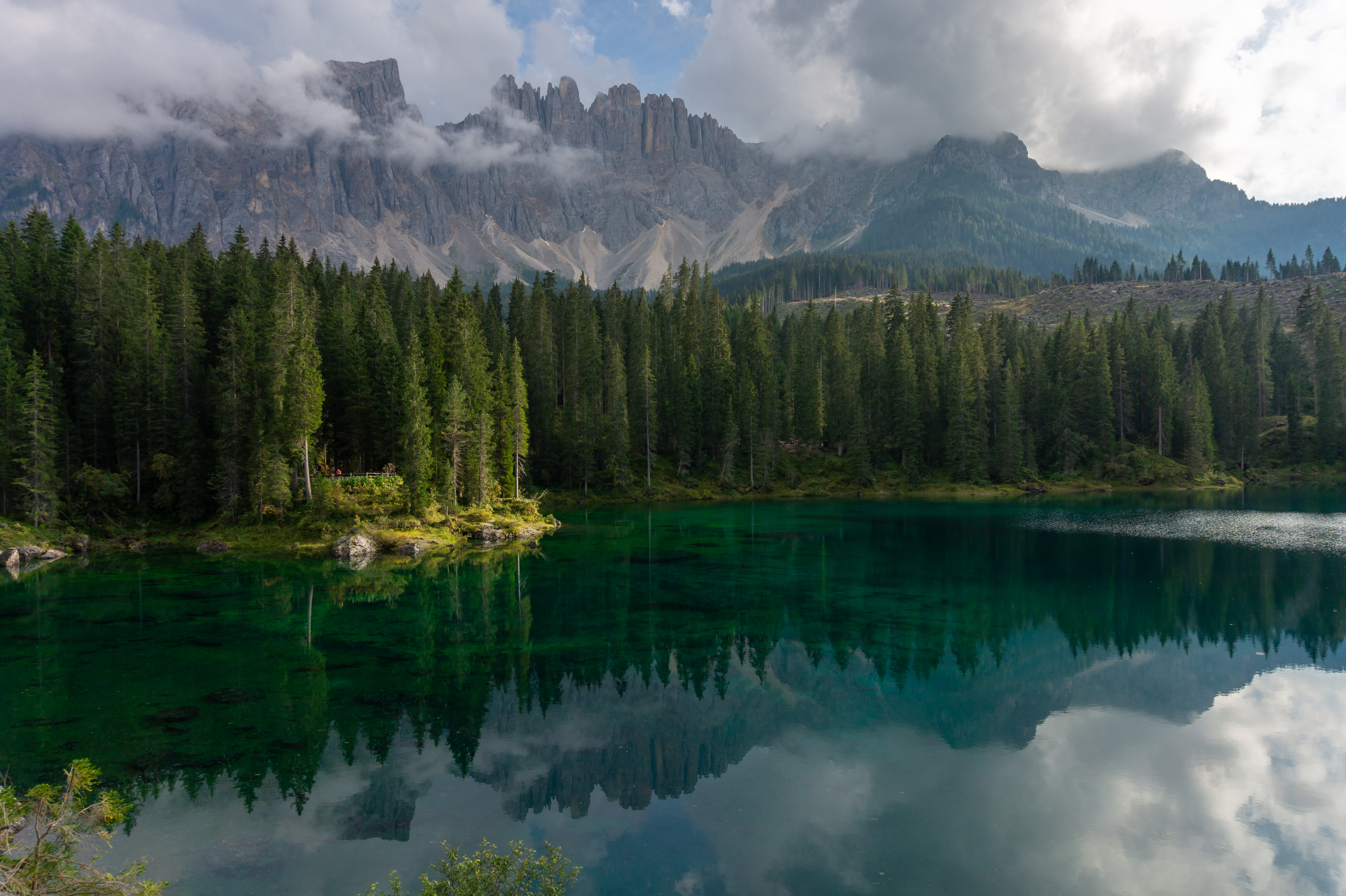
View on the lake heading South-East

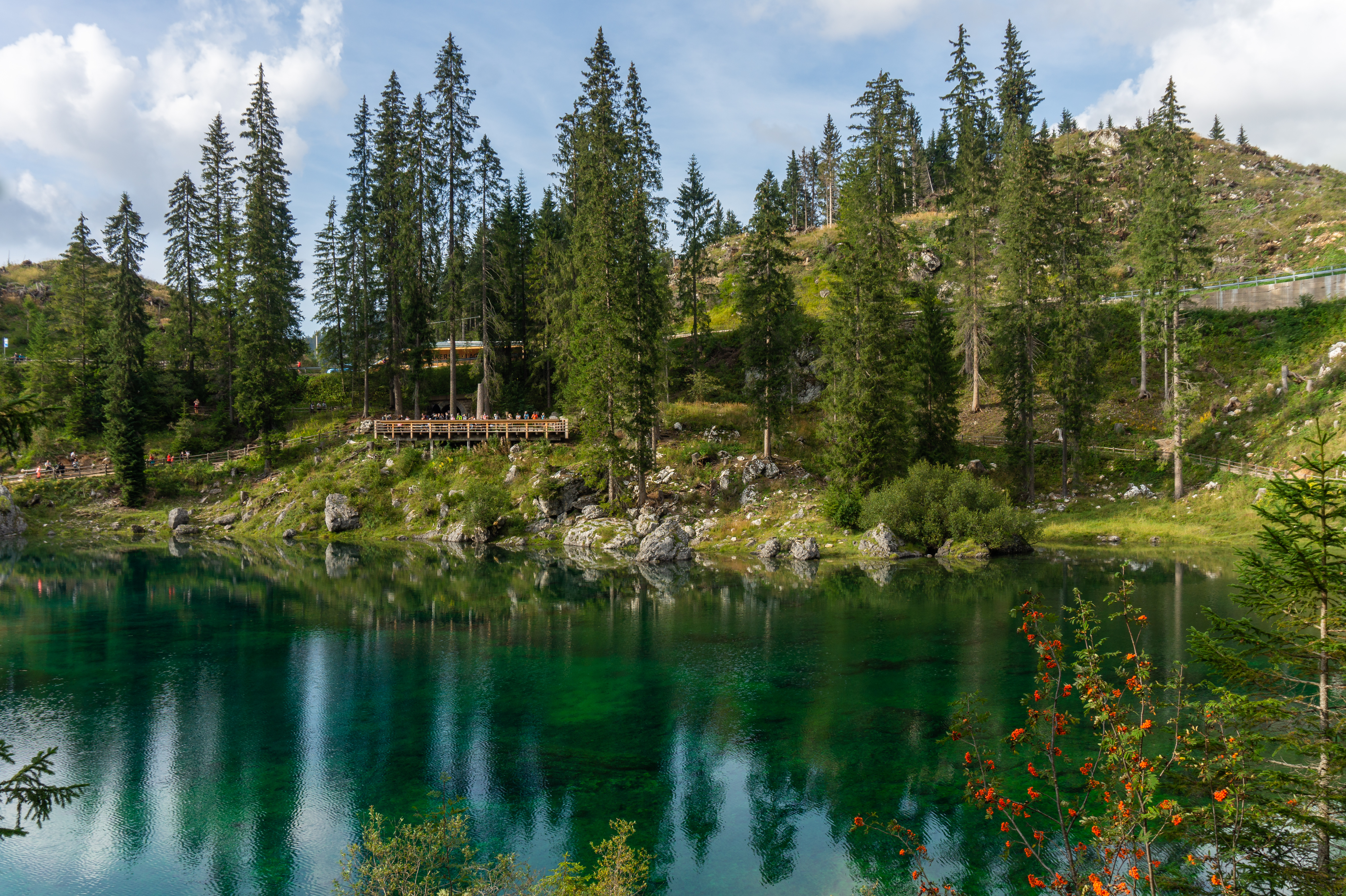
View on the lake heading West

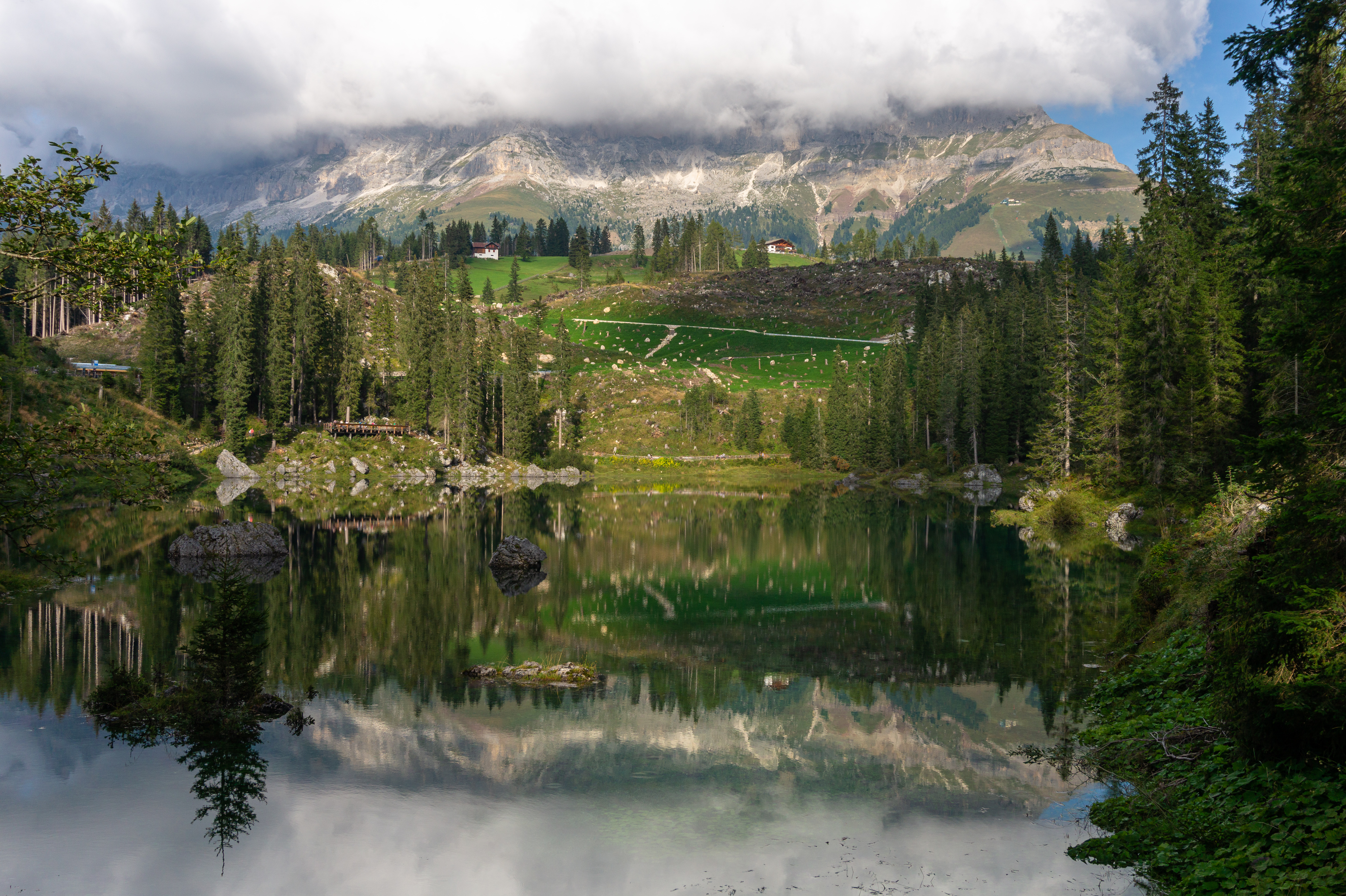
View heading North. The aftermath of the transit of storm Adrian in 2018 can be seen.

== Bibliography ==
- Eduard Clemenz (1924). "Ein Ausflug von Meran zum Karersee und zum Karerpaß". Meraner Zeitung, July 27, p. 3 (online).
