= Tierser Tal =

Coordinates: 46°27′58″N 11°31′02″E

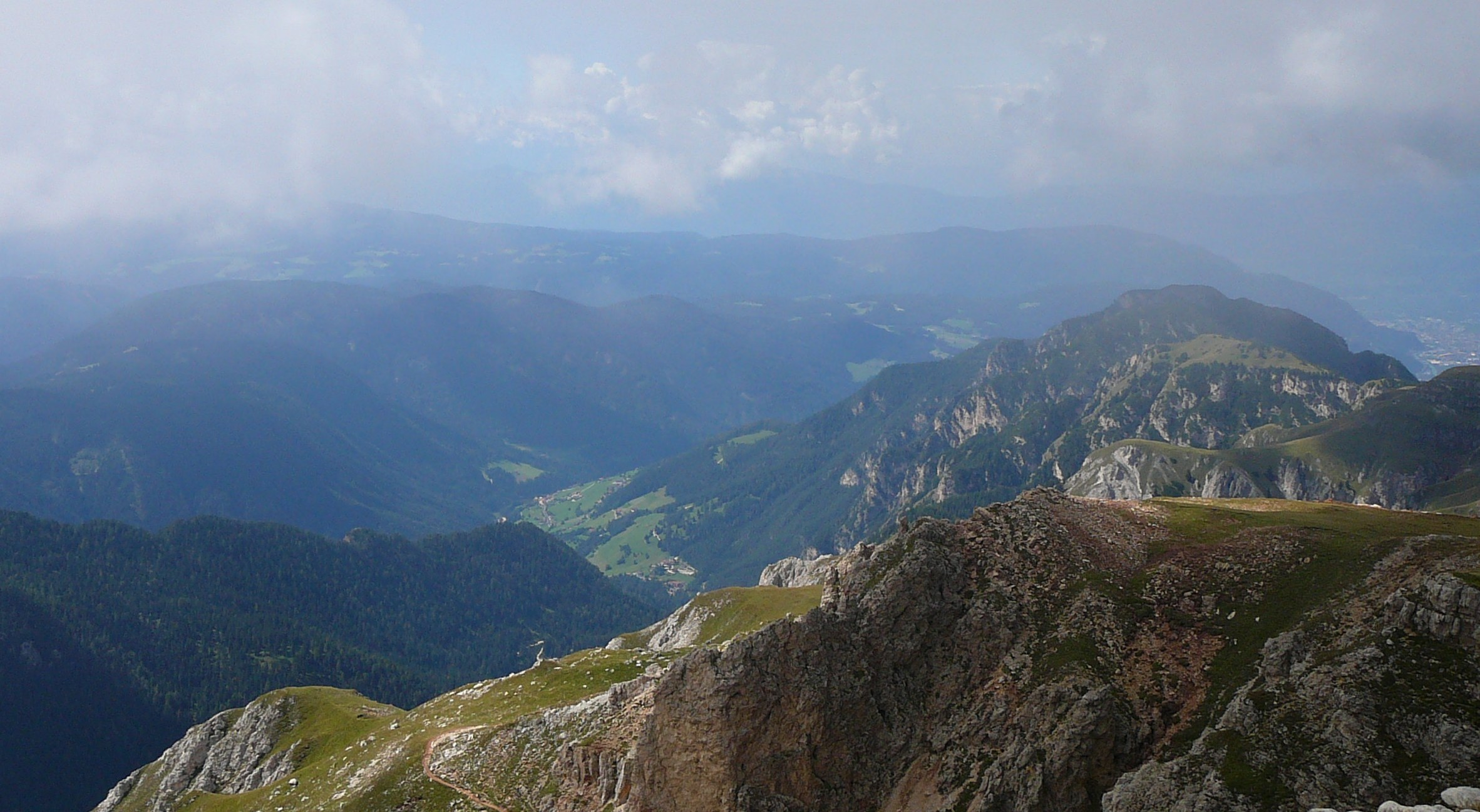
Tierser Tal

The Tierser Tal (also German: Tiersertal; Italian: Val di Tires [ˈval di ˈtiːres]) is a side valley of the Eisacktal in South Tyrol, Italy.
