= Paul Preuss (climber) =

Austrian mountaineer (1886–1913)

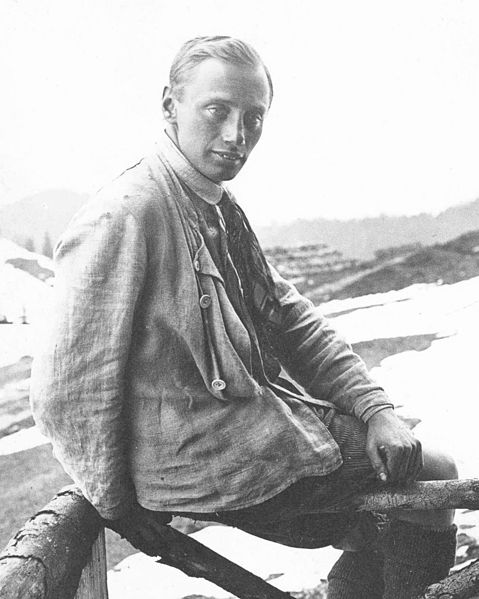
Paul Preuss

Paul Preuss (spelled Preuß in German; pronounced Proyce) (19 August 1886 – 3 October 1913) was an Austrian alpinist and rock climber who achieved recognition for his bold solo ascents and for his advocacy of an ethically "pure" alpinism and rock climbing (e.g., limit any form of aid climbing). He is an important figure in the history of rock climbing and the development of free climbing as the dominant format of alpinism and rock climbing.

== Early years ==
Paul Preuss was born in the mountain town of Altaussee, Austria, on 19 August 1886. His father, Eduard, a Hungarian of Jewish descent, taught music; his mother, Caroline Lauchheim, an Alsatian, had been a private tutor for a baron. They met when Eduard was engaged to give Caroline's wards music lessons. Based in Vienna, Eduard Preuss and his family (including two older sisters, Sophie and Mina) spent summers in Altaussee, following the migratory patterns of the vacationing Viennese upper class that employed him. As a boy, Preuss would often accompany his father, an amateur botanist, on his rambles throughout the local mountains of Altaussee. Never a robust child, at the age of six, Preuss was struck with a polio-like virus that left him partially paralyzed and confined to a bed or a wheelchair throughout that winter and spring. Once sufficiently recovered, he practiced gymnastic exercises and took walks to increase his strength. Though his father died when Preuss was in his tenth year, the latter continued the tradition of their mountain rambles, sometimes accompanied by his sisters or friends but often alone. At the age of eleven, he began pursuing summits in earnest, inaugurating his career as a mountaineer. Later, as his interest in alpinism intensified, he would train by placing inverted glasses on top of a wardrobe and doing pull-ups on these unstable supports – excellent practice for loose rock. One-armed pull-ups also became part of his routine (though apparently not on a glass). Following in the footsteps of his father's avocation, after high school Preuss studied plant physiology at the University of Vienna and was awarded a doctoral degree at the Ludwig-Maximilians-Universität München in 1911. After graduation, he became an assistant at the Botanical Institute of the Ludwig-Maximilians-Universität München.

== Early climbing career ==
At the age of twenty Preuss began to climb at a respectable level and just before his twenty-second birthday, he made his first important ascent, the Pichl-Route on the North Face of the Planspitze as a solo climb. Preuss climbed and traversed a remarkable number of mountains in a short period of time, significantly increasing his experience, skill and technique. Over his short career he made 1,200 ascents, three hundred of which were done solo, and one hundred and fifty of which were first ascents. Preuss was a well-rounded alpinist, not only mastering the rock climbing elements of alpine climbing routes, but making first ascents on snow and ice sections as well. He also pursued ski mountaineering, ski traverses (accomplishing firsts in both these areas), and snowshoeing. When stuck studying in Munich, he would often go buildering on the Propylaea.

Though he would often climb solo avoiding overly-trafficked areas, he was not anti-social. He loved being with a small group of friends, and often climbed with friends, including many women, such as his sister Mina. He is said to have been very amiable, witty, and fun-loving, as well as self-sacrificing in favor of his friends. Walter Bing, reminiscing in his tribute to Preuss's life, wrote of him: Ach! One of the most dreadful characteristics of our beloved "Preusserl" was that he was inclined to crack the same lame old incredibly punchline-less joke ten times a day, and yet ten times a day we laughed at it and were gladdened by it. On the fiftieth anniversary of Preuss's death Kurt Maix wrote of him: His climbing partners – insofar as they are still living, they are old white-haired men – say of him: "He was a real rascal, a dear rascal. An extremely bright rascal." Preuss was also an excellent chess player, tennis player, ice skater, and spoke English, French, German and Italian.

== Beginnings of ethics of pure style ==
Preuss gained renown in the summer of 1911, with his second ascent of the 600-metre (2,000 ft) limestone West Face of the Totenkirchl, considered to be one of the hardest multi-pitch climbing routes in the Alps. While first ascent took seven hours, Preuss free solo climbed in two and a half, including a new variation. This was rapidly followed by a solo first ascent of the East Face of the Guglia di Brenta. In the next few months he made the second ascents of Angelo Dibona's routes on the Croz dell'Altissimo and the Northwest Ridge of the Grossen Ödstein, making a point of not using any of the pitons left by the first ascensionists, thereby putting into practice his desire to climb as his predecessors Georg Winkler and Emil Zsigmondy had: in a pure style, meaning without any artificial aids (without guides in Zsigmondy's case and solo, in Winkler's). Pitons and carabiners were just starting to be effectively adapted for use in the mountains. At first, they were just used for protection or securing a rappel line, but then increasingly became used for upward progress, for instance as hand or footholds, or to secure the rope for a pendulum or tension traverse. To Preuss, this was nothing less than cheating. You should have to bring yourself up to the level of a difficult new route by improving your abilities; you shouldn't have to bring the mountain down to your level by improving your technological gadgetry. Preuss prized human achievement, measuring ourselves against the mountains, not technological achievement, reducing the mountain to the measure of our tools: With artificial climbing aids, you have transformed the mountains into a mechanical plaything. Eventually, they will break or wear out, and then nothing else will be left for you to do than to throw them away.

== Mauerhakenstreit (piton dispute) ==
In September 1911 Preuss's essay "Artificial Aids on Alpine Routes" appeared in the Deutsche Alpenzeitung. This essay, an incendiary polemic against the increasing use of artificial aid in the Alps, sparked off a series of published exchanges from such renowned alpinists of the day as Tita Piaz and Franz Nieberl. This debate became known as the Mauerhakenstreit or the piton dispute. It was in a later essay that Preuss distilled the main points of his ethics of pure style into his celebrated six principles:

1. You should not be equal to the mountain climbs you undertake, you should be superior.
2. The degree of difficulty that a climber is able to overcome with security on the descent and also believes himself capable of with an easy conscience must represent the upper limit of what he climbs on the ascent.
3. The justification for the use of artificial aids consequently exists only in the event of an immediately threatening danger.
4. The piton is an emergency reserve and not the basis for a method of working.
5. The rope is permitted as a relief-bringing means but never as the one true means for making the ascent of the mountain possible.
6. The principle of security belongs to the highest principles. But not the frantic correction of one's own insecurity attained by means of artificial aids, but rather that primary security which with every climber should be based on the correct estimation of his ability in relation to his desire.

Note that any use of pitons, whether as protection or as belay or rappel anchors would be unethical, except under dire need. Even rappelling was something he objected to, something only to be used in the event of serious danger. If you can't climb down a route, you shouldn't climb up it either. For Preuss, getting back down is part of climbing the route, and descending aided by pure technology is certainly not climbing under your own power. So Preuss advocated teaching and practicing down-climbing. Mastering the art of down-climbing also eliminates the need for piton protection while leading – the climber's skill and self-confidence is his protection. Ropes were acceptable for belaying as long as the leader could and would climb the pitch up and down free solo (and feel comfortable about doing so). Slinging flakes and the like would be acceptable under the same conditions. But Preuss would most likely have considered modern nuts and camming units to be artificial aid, even when just used for protection. Consequently, he would have condemned most modern climbing, even what we call “free climbing,” as artificial aid! So even though many today embrace Preuss as a precursor of Walter Bonatti, Reinhold Messner and Royal Robbins in their scrupulous avoidance of bolts, Preuss would have been appalled at their heavy reliance on other technological aids. But perhaps it could be said that they all share a philosophy, one highlighting human adventure and ability over sheer technological advancement. Though most of his opponents agreed with his principles in theory, in practice Preuss was basically accused of having gone too far in the direction of one extreme in order to combat another. Specifically, he was, among other things, accused of:

- Inhumanity, since leaders would not be able to place protection even when this might save their lives in the event of an accident,
- Endangering the lives of professional guides,
- Seducing young climbers into sacrificing themselves to the “terrible Moloch” of his high ideal,
- Inconsistency, since the shoes and ice axes he used should also be counted as artificial aids.

Yet Preuss didn't take this heavy opposition to his ideas too much to heart. He could even joke about it: My fingertips were climbed through, adhesive tape had to come to my aid, which even the severe critic probably won't charge as a violation of my theories on artificial aid since I used the adhesive tape with the sticky side facing inward.

Reinhold Messner suggests that Preuss was no zealot who expected an absolutely rigid adherence to his principles. In practice, compromise may be the best way. He points to the fact that Preuss did use fixed pins as protection at least twice (on the second ascent of the Rizzikamin [Rizzi Chimney], which is usually wet, on the South Face of the Innerkofler Tower) instead of backing off as he should have by his own lights, and he even personally placed two pitons: on the first ascent of the Trisselwand, Preuss reached a crux section as it was getting late in the day and, reluctant to commit to the risky move required, eventually placed two pitons, probably merely to spare the female member of the party an uncomfortable night out. As Messner writes: A compromise is possible in practice..., not in philosophy. One should always strive for the ideal. But Messner notwithstanding, we probably shouldn't exaggerate the amount of compromise Preuss would have deemed acceptable.

A link to an English translation of the Mauerhakenstreit: http://issuu.com/randisi/docs/mauerhakenstreit_complete_illustrated

== Last years ==
Preuss became the most demanded lecturer on alpinism in the German-speaking world at that time. He was said to be both a witty and spell-binding lecturer. Martin Grabner (in his Preuss entry on Bergsteigen.at; Alpines Lexicon) claims that during this time Preuss made his living delivering such lectures, which would make him the precursor of our modern professional climbers as well as the precursor of pure climbing ethics. In all, he had more than fifty lectures scheduled for the year he died.

Günther Freiherr von Saar claims that Preuss learned “modern ice-craft” during the summers of 1912 and 1913 from Oscar Eckenstein, the inventor of the ten-point crampon.

In 1912, he witnessed the well-known British mountaineer H. O. Jones, Jones's new wife Muriel Edwards, and their guide Julius Truffer fall to their death on the Aiguille Rouge de Peuterey. Preuss, who was unroped and scouting, returned only to watch Truffer fall due to a broken hold, taking the rest of the party with him.

Preuss often climbed alone because he believed soloing to be safer; only his own life was at stake. Even before the Joneses' tragedy, he was unwilling to risk the lives of his belayers on difficult routes. Ironically, he was accused of inhumanity by Tita Piaz during the Piton Dispute (in spite of the fact that they were friends). However, his soloing eventually caught up with him. On 3 October 1913, in an attempt to make the first ascent of the North Ridge of the Mandlkogel free solo, Preuss fell more than 300 metres (980 ft) to his death. His body was found a week and a half later, buried under a foot and a half of new-fallen snow.

While the actual cause of the fall will never be known, an open pocketknife and a rucksack with a length of sling material, as well as some cairns found ten years later, suggest that Preuss may have stopped for a rest high on the upper ridge and lost his balance as he tried to catch the pocketknife after it slipped from his grasp. Of course, other scenarios would also be consistent with these facts.

== In commemoration ==
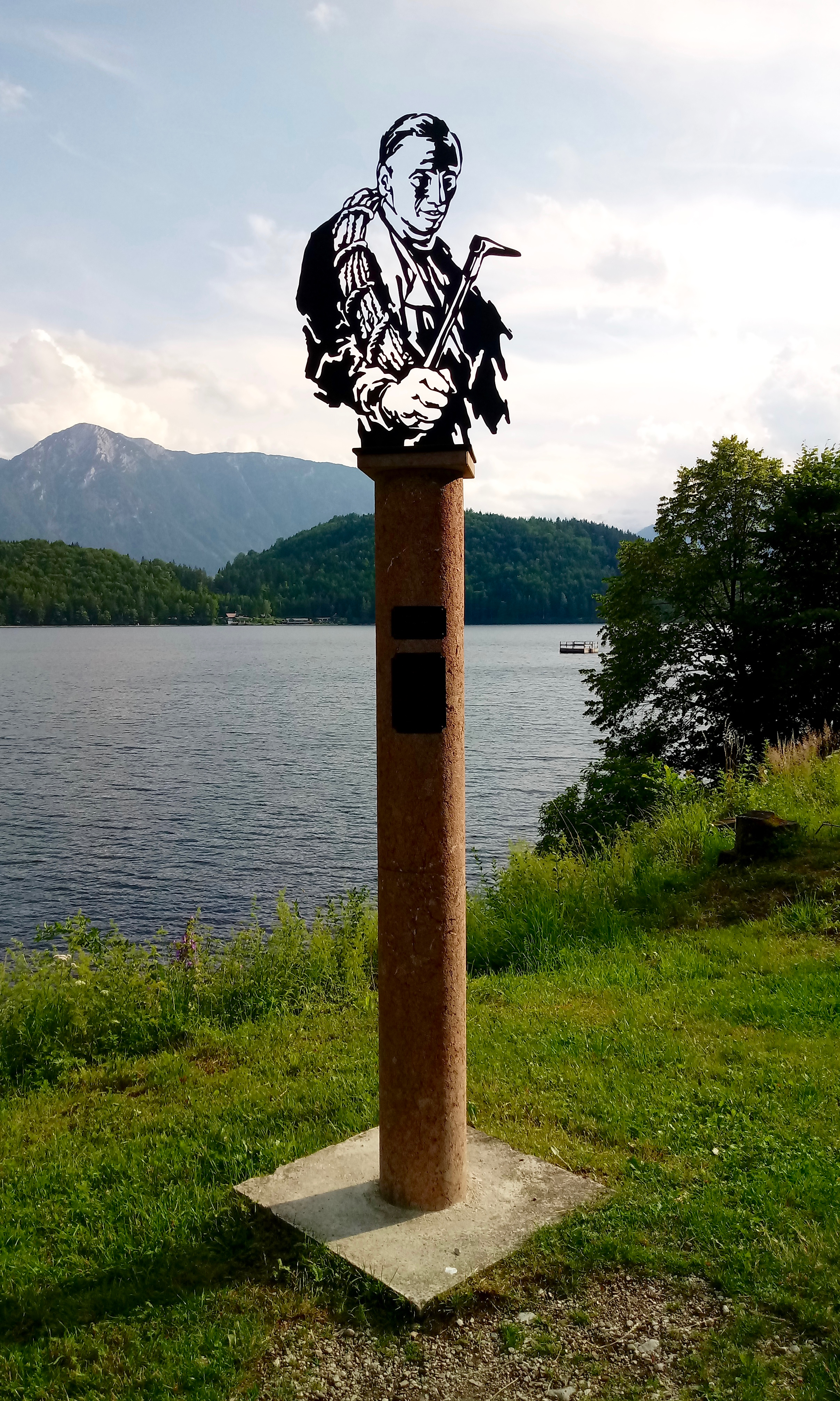
Paul Preuss memorial in Altaussee

In the early 1920s, the German and Austrian Alpine Club became a breeding ground for anti-Semitism. In fact, a predominantly Jewish chapter of the club was expelled in 1924, and at least one of Preuss's climbing partners became a committed Nazi. Thus, for a time, Preuss's name and reputation were actively erased from memory. It was only in the 1970s that his legacy was finally rediscovered.

Piaz, Preuss's friend and one time opponent in the Piton Dispute, erected a memorial in his honor twenty years after his death in the Italian Dolomites, which was a risky endeavor considering the rising tide of anti-Semitism and Fascism in the early 1930s (albeit Piaz was an anarchist who had been thrown into jail several times for his opposition to government in any form).

The Kleinste Zinne now bears the name Torre Preuss (also known as the Cima Piccolissima), home of the Preuss Crack. A chimney on the South East Face of the Grohmannspitze, the Preusskamin, also features his name. In addition, there is a street dedicated to him in Munich.

In a 2010 interview on Deutsche Welle, famed mountaineer Reinhold Messner named him as one of his heroes.

== Coda ==
Next to a list of Preuss's major ascents, the closing words of Geoffrey Winthrop Young's 1913 obituary, may provide the best coda to Preuss's life:

Solitary climbing will always have its critics as well as its devotees. But with the feeling of regret for the premature death of a great climber and a fine personality comes also the feeling of pride that there are still men of the highest intellect in our generation who, with the full knowledge of all the easier and more profitable alternatives that life has to offer, continue to match their skill as it increases against increasing difficulty, and accept the issue with calm courage.

—

== Selected notable ascents ==
Preuss's hardest climbs were rated Grade V or about 5.7-5.8 YDS. He was soloing near the limit of difficulty for the day – and with hobnailed boots.

- Kleiner Litzner (solo)
- Großes Seehorn – Großlitzner (solo)
- Kleiner Litzner, North Ridge (solo)
- Großlitzner, North Face (first ascent)
- Glötterspitze (solo)
- Totenkirchl, West Face (second ascent with a new variation, solo)
- Guglia di Brenta (also known as the Campanile Basso), East Face (first ascent, solo)
- Crozzon di Brenta, Northeast Face (first)
- Croz dell'Altissimo, South Face (second)
- Grohmannspitze, South East Face (second)
- Innerkoflerturm, South Face (second)
- Langkofel-Fünffingerspitze-Grohmannspitze-Sellajoch (first traverse in one day, solo)
- Delagoturm, South Chimney (first)
- Kleine Zinne (first double traverse)
- Kleinste Zinne (first ascent and first traverse)
- Traweng, North Face (first)
- Trisselwand (first)
- Grosser Ödstein, North Ridge (second ascent)
- Hochwanner, North Ridge (first)
- Mitterkaiser, Nordgipfel (first)
- Aiguille Gamba (first)
- L'Innominata, Southeast Ridge (first)
- Aiguille Savoie, Southeast Ridge (first)
- Pointe des Papillons, Hauptgipfel (first, solo)
- Aiguille Rouge de Triolet, South Ridge (first)
- Strichkogel, East Face (first)
- Däumling (first)
- Gosauer Mandl (first)

== See also ==
- History of rock climbing

== Sources ==
- Alpines Lexicon. Paul Preuss entry at https://web.archive.org/web/20100731022902/http://www.bergsteigen.at/de/lexikon.aspx?ID=64
- End, Willi. "Grosser Manndlkogel: Seine Ersteigungsgeschichte", Österreichische Alpenzeitung, Juli/August Heft (1972), S. 90–97
- Maix, Kurt. "Paul Preuß – der Spaziergänger zu den Wolken," Jugend am Berg, Heft 4 (1963), S. 117–123
- Messner, Reinhold. Paul Preuss. Verlag J. Berg bei Bruckmann, München 1996, ISBN 3-7654-2855-8
- Mokrejs, Adolf. "'...wie ein Vogel fliegt': Zum hundertsten Geburtstag von Paul Preuß", Mitteilungen des Deutschen Alpenverein, Juni Heft (1986); S. 62–64
- Oertel, Eugen. "Dr. Paul Preuß", Österreichische Alpenzeitung, Bd. 35 (1913), S. 357–377
- Saar, Günther Freiherr von. "Paul Preuss", Alpine Journal, Vol. XXVIII (1914), No. 203, pp. 50–57
- Winthrop Young, Geoffrey. "The Fatal Accident to Dr. Paul Preuss", Alpine Journal, Vol. XXVII (1913), No. 202, pp. 427–429
