= Ulrich Senoner =

Ladin former architect and hermit

Ulrich Senoner is a Ladin former architect from Val Gardena in South Tyrol, Italy. Since 2019, he has lived year-round in an isolated alpine hut known as Malga Futura, situated at an elevation of approximately 2,050 metres (6,730 ft) on the Seiser Alm in the Dolomites. His life there has been the subject of several television, radio and newspaper reports and of the documentary film project A Penny Weighs More Than a Soul, directed by his nephew Tobias Demetz.

== Architectural career and return to South Tyrol ==
Senoner is originally from Val Gardena. He lived outside South Tyrol for several years and worked as an architect in Vienna and later in Berlin and Potsdam. According to Südtirol News, environmental sustainability and the economical use of natural resources were already recurring themes in his architectural work.

In 2019, Senoner returned to South Tyrol and settled permanently in a small hut below the Plattkofel, near the edge of the Seiser Alm. The area had formed part of his childhood, when he accompanied his grandfather there during haymaking.

== Life at Malga Futura ==
Senoner calls the hut Malga Futura. It is located at approximately 2,050 metres (6,730 ft) above sea level and around nine kilometres by foot from Sëlva.

The hut is not connected to the electricity grid and has no running water or gas supply. Senoner heats the building and cooks with a wood-burning stove, obtains water from nearby springs or melted snow, and uses a small solar panel to provide limited electricity. He grows potatoes in a small garden and gathers wild plants and roots. Food is also occasionally brought to him by relatives and visitors.

Senoner has described his life at Malga Futura as an attempt to determine how simply and independently a person can live. He has said that he wants to encourage people dissatisfied with the stress of contemporary society to consider a simpler life with a closer connection to nature.

== Media coverage and documentary ==
RAI Ladinia profiled Senoner and his life in the mountains in the 2021 programme Dai Crëps dl Sela – Ulrich Senoner n armunia cun la natura. Later that year, the Italian publication Pavia Press released a report and video entitled Ulli, l'eremita delle Dolomiti.

Senoner's nephew, filmmaker Tobias Demetz, began recording his uncle's daily life and initially published short videos online. The project subsequently developed into the 45-minute documentary A Penny Weighs More Than a Soul. Demetz spent several years filming Senoner and accumulated approximately 130 hours of footage, including material recorded during extended stays at the hut.

In September 2025, RAI Südtirol interviewed Demetz about the documentary, and the South Tyrolean newspaper portal STOL published a profile of his filmmaking work. In November 2025, RAI News reported that the documentary was nearing completion and that Demetz intended to submit it to international film festivals.
