= Seiser Alm =

Dolomite plateau and Alpine meadow in Italy

- Alpe di Siusi; Mont Sëuc
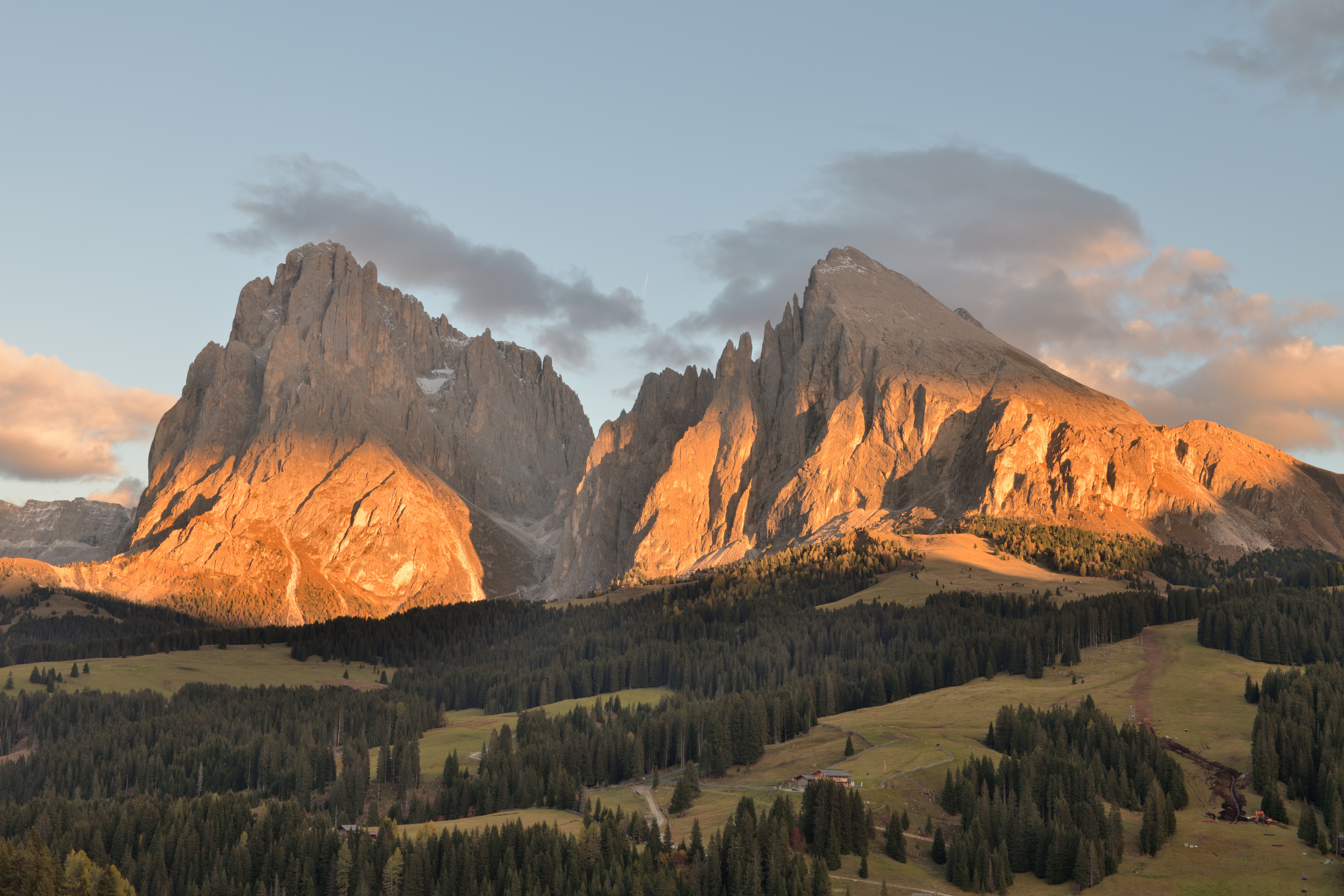
- Seiser Alm with the mountains of Langkofel Group in the background

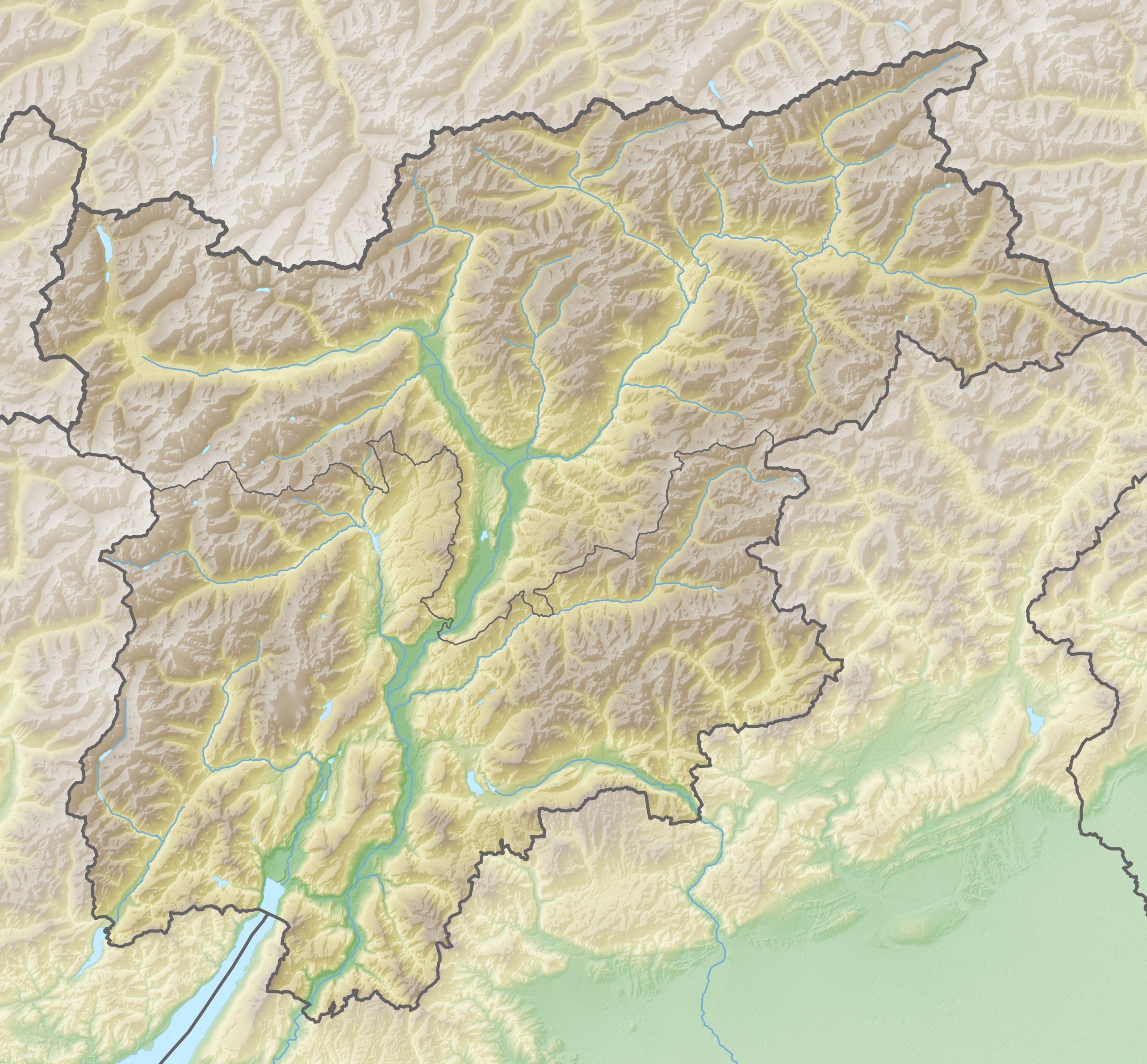
- Location within Alps Location within Trentino-Alto Adige/Südtirol
- Floor elevation: 1,700 m (5,600 ft)
- Area: 52 km^{2} (20 mi^{2})

Geography
- Country: Italy
- State/Province: Trentino-Alto Adige
- Population center: Bolzano
- Coordinates: 46°32′28″N 11°38′40.99″E
- Interactive map of Seiser Alm

Seiser Alm (Italian: Alpe di Siusi; Ladin: Mont Sëuc) is a Dolomite plateau and the largest high-elevation Alpine meadow (German: Alm) in Europe. Located in Italy's South Tyrol province in the Dolomites mountain range, it is a major tourist attraction, notably for skiing and hiking.

== Geography ==
It is located in the western part of the Dolomites and has an elevation between 1,680 meters (5,510 ft) and 2,350 meters (7,710 ft); it extends for 52 square kilometers (20 sq mi) between Val Gardena to the north, the Sassolungo Group to the northeast, and the Sciliar massif to the southeast, which with its unmistakable profile is one of the best-known symbols of all the Dolomites. Given the vastness of the area, from here it is possible to admire a large number of mountain groups: among others, the Sella Group, the Rosengarten group, and the Marmolada.

It is the largest mountain pasture in Europe. It is divided into numerous plots reserved to grazing or from which farmers obtain hay for their farms at lower elevations.

The eastern part has been included in Sciliar Natural Park since 1975.

=== Surrounding peaks ===
The pasture offers a panoramic view that includes (from north, in a clockwise direction): Peitlerkofel (Sass de Putia, 1,873 m or 6,145 ft), the Odle and the Puez groups (3,025 m or 9,925 ft), the Gran Cir, the Sella group (3,152 m or 10,341 ft), Langkofel (Sassolungo, 3,181 m or 10,436 ft) and Plattkofel (Sassopiatto, 2,995 m or 9,826 ft), the Marmolada (3,343 m or 10,968 ft), the Pala group (Pale di San Martino, 3,192 m or 10,472 ft), the Vajolet Towers (2,821 m or 9,255 ft) the Rosengarten group (Catinaccio, 2,981 m or 9,780 ft) with the peak of the Kesselkogel (Catinaccio d'Antermoia, 3,002 m or 9,849 ft) and the Schlern (Sciliar, 2,450 m or 8,040 ft).

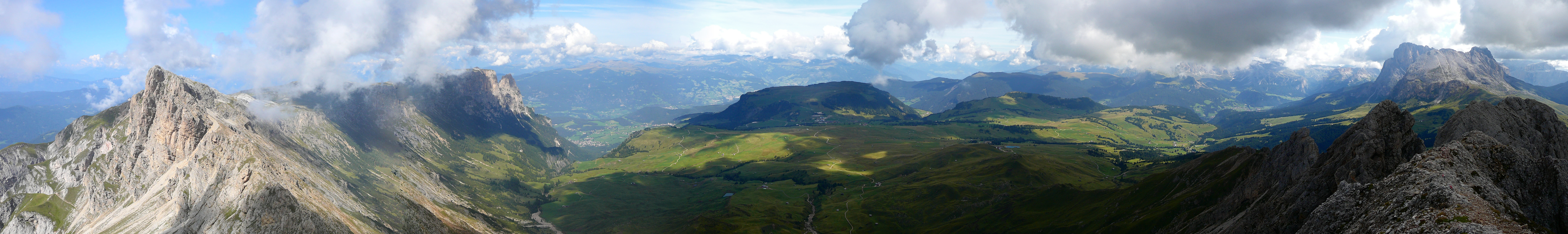
On the left, the Roterdspitze (Cima di Terrarossa) and the Schlern, in the middle the Seiser Alm with the Puflatsch (Bullaccia) and the Pizberg (Piz), on the right the Langkofel, largely hidden by the Plattkofel.

== Climate ==
Climate data for Seiser Alm (2013−2022 normals, extremes 2013−present): 2,051 m (6,729 ft)
Month	Jan	Feb	Mar	Apr	May	Jun	Jul	Aug	Sep	Oct	Nov	Dec	Year
Record high °C (°F)	9.6 (49.3)	10.1 (50.2)	10.8 (51.4)	13.9 (57.0)	19.9 (67.8)	25.8 (78.4)	24.0 (75.2)	24.7 (76.5)	19.6 (67.3)	17.1 (62.8)	15.1 (59.2)	11.3 (52.3)	25.8 (78.4)
Mean daily maximum °C (°F)	−1.3 (29.7)	0.2 (32.4)	2.1 (35.8)	5.3 (41.5)	9.2 (48.6)	15.1 (59.2)	17.1 (62.8)	16.3 (61.3)	12.2 (54.0)	8.6 (47.5)	3.6 (38.5)	0.7 (33.3)	7.4 (45.4)
Daily mean °C (°F)	−4.5 (23.9)	−3.3 (26.1)	−1.7 (28.9)	1.7 (35.1)	5.4 (41.7)	10.9 (51.6)	12.8 (55.0)	12.2 (54.0)	8.5 (47.3)	5.2 (41.4)	0.9 (33.6)	−2.2 (28.0)	3.8 (38.9)
Mean daily minimum °C (°F)	−7.6 (18.3)	−6.8 (19.8)	−5.4 (22.3)	−2.0 (28.4)	1.7 (35.1)	6.7 (44.1)	8.4 (47.1)	8.2 (46.8)	4.8 (40.6)	1.8 (35.2)	−1.9 (28.6)	−5.2 (22.6)	0.2 (32.4)
Record low °C (°F)	−19.1 (−2.4)	−21.9 (−7.4)	−16.5 (2.3)	−14.0 (6.8)	−9.3 (15.3)	0.0 (32.0)	0.8 (33.4)	−0.2 (31.6)	−3.5 (25.7)	−7.0 (19.4)	−13.3 (8.1)	−15.8 (3.6)	−21.9 (−7.4)
Average precipitation mm (inches)	22.6 (0.89)	30.4 (1.20)	33.6 (1.32)	69.3 (2.73)	133.9 (5.27)	135.6 (5.34)	198.2 (7.80)	186.5 (7.34)	99.6 (3.92)	99.7 (3.93)	88.0 (3.46)	31.0 (1.22)	1,128.4 (44.42)
Source: Landeswetterdienst Südtirol

== History ==
The area was once a primeval forest used for hunting by Middle Stone Age people. In the Bronze Age, people began to use the forest as grazing land for cattle. A Roman mule path leads up to the plateau from Siusi.

== Classification ==
The SOIUSA system considers the plateau as an alpine group with the following classification:

- Main part: Eastern Alps
- Major sector: South-Eastern Alps
- Section: Dolomites
- Subsection: North-Western Dolomites
- Supergroup: Gardena's Dolomites
- Group: Seiser Alp Group
- Code: II/C-31. III-A.3

It also attributes to the plateau the three following subgroups:

- Subgroup A: Palancia-Cresta di Siusi ridge
- Subgroup B: Dorsal Denti di Terra Rossa-Punta d'Oro-Piz ridge
- Subgroup C: Dorsal Bulacia-Salames-Col di Rende ridge
  Langkofel Group (Italian: Gruppo del Sassolongo) seen from Seiser Alm during winter.
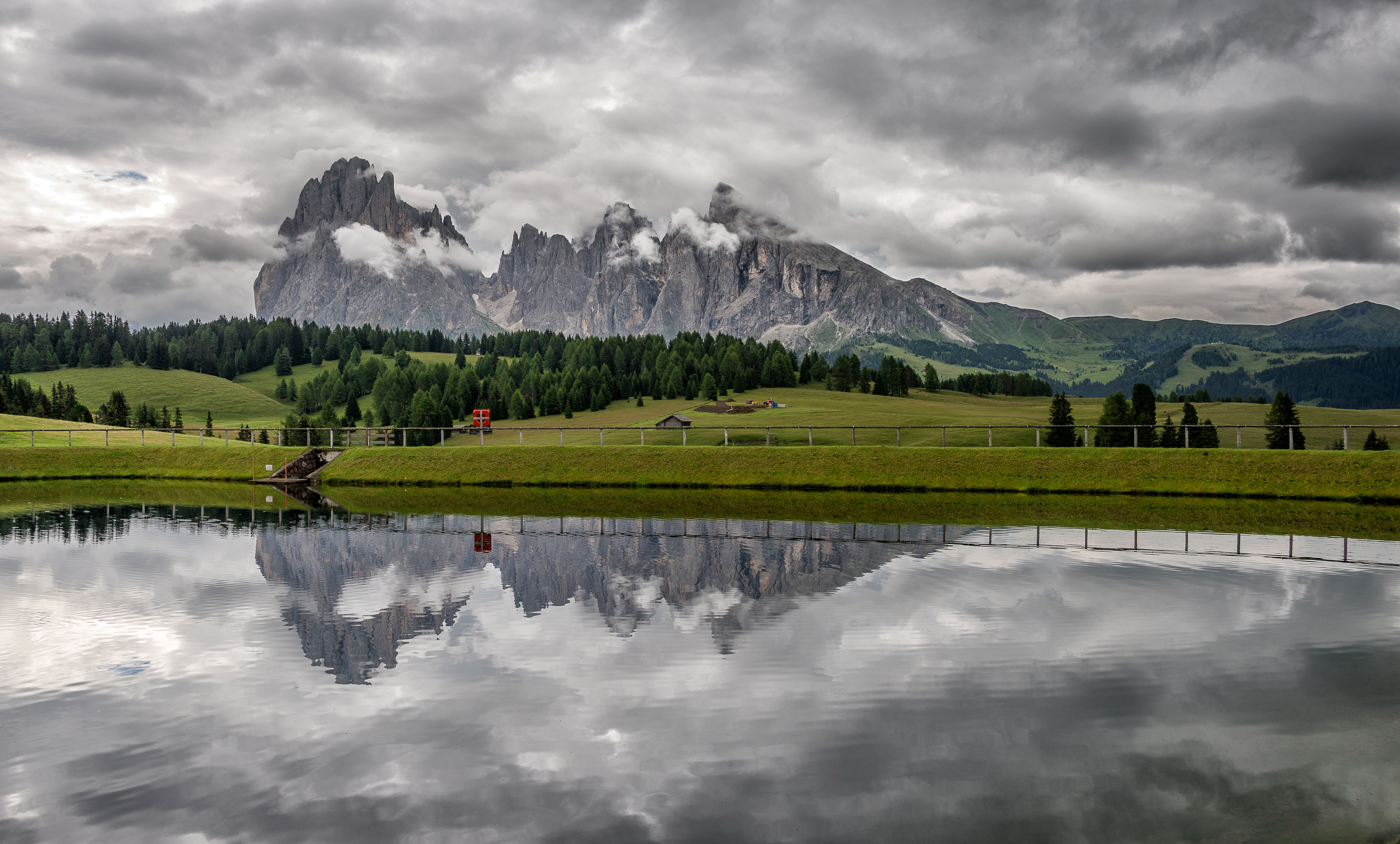
  View from the plateau
