= Langkofel Group =

Mountain in Italy

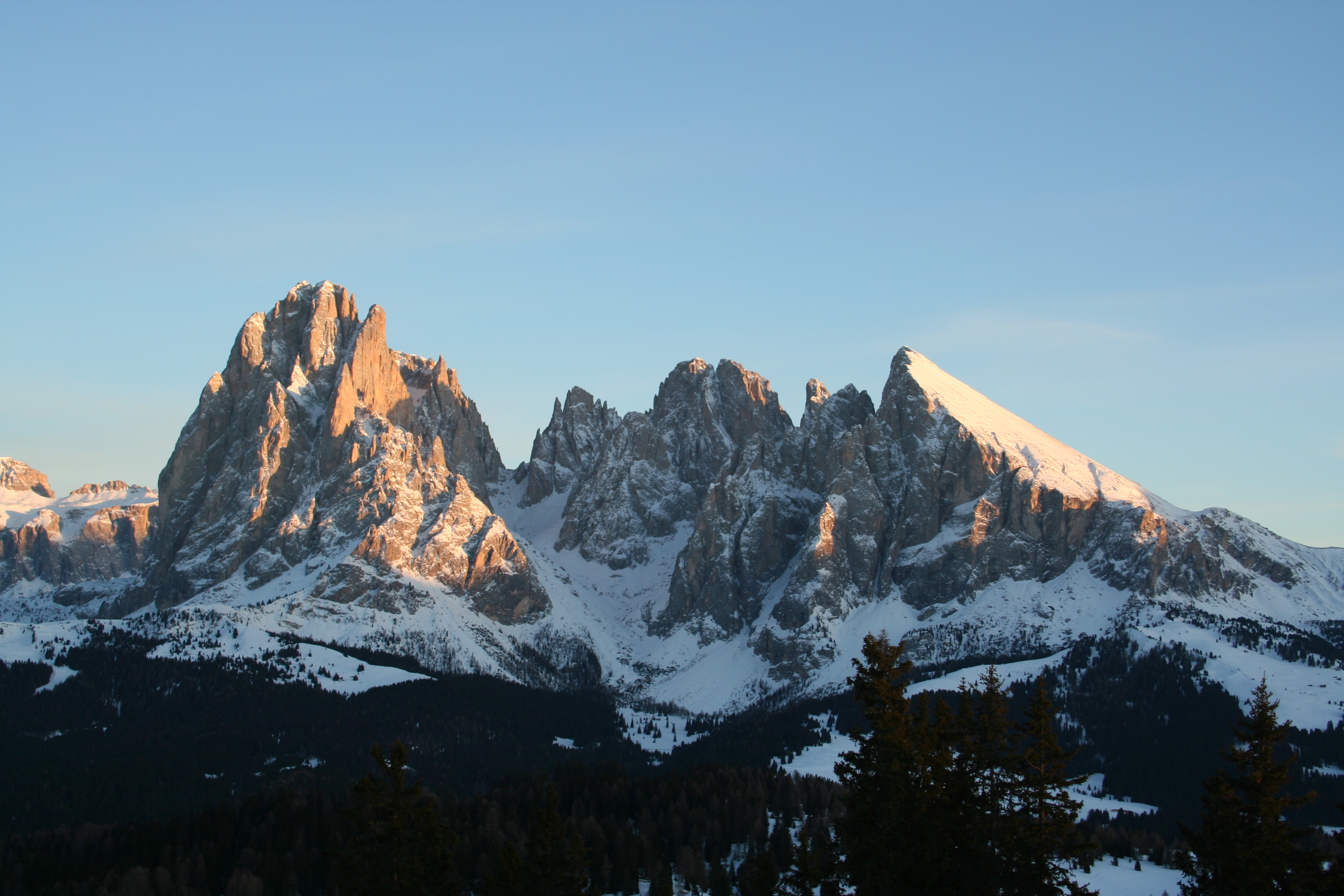
- The Sassolungo Group against the evening skies.

Highest point
- Peak: Sassolungo
- Elevation: 3,181 m s.l.m.

Geography
- Location within Alps
- State(s): Trentino-Alto Adige/Südtirol, Italy
- Range coordinates: 46°31′29″N 11°44′07″E
- Parent range: Dolomites

The Saslonch Group (Italian: Gruppo del Sassolungo), or the Sassolungo Group (German: Langkofel), is a massif in the (western) Dolomites of the Italian Alps. It separates Val Gardena (to the north) and the Fassa valley (to the south), as well as the Sella massif (to the east) and the Rosengarten (to the west). Northwest of the Langkofel is the Seiser Alm. The highest point in the range is the Sassolungol with a height of 3,181 metres. Taken together, the summits of the Langkofel form an arc which is only open towards the northwest. Within this arc there is only one small mountain, the Langkofelkarspitze, so that the group surrounds a kind of "inner courtyard".

== Geology ==
The region was formed in the early Triassic period (about 230 million years ago) as a coral reef in a shallow tropical sea. Hard limestone was able to form on the outside of the reef, whilst the rock in the interior remained brittle and was quickly eroded away following the uplifting of the range. This left a garland of mountains which, in a clockwise direction, are the Langkofel, Langkofeleck, Fünffingerspitze, Grohmannspitze, Innerkoflerturm, Zahnkofel and Plattkofel.

== Summits ==
- Grohmannspitze (Italian: Punta Grohmann, Sasso Levante, Ladin: Sas da duman)
- Innerkoflerturm
- Zahnkofel (Il Dente/l Dënt)
- Langkofelkarspitze
- Plattkofel (Sasso Piatto/Sasplat)
- Fünffingerspitze (Punta Cinquedita)
- Langkofel (Sasso Lungo/Saslonch)
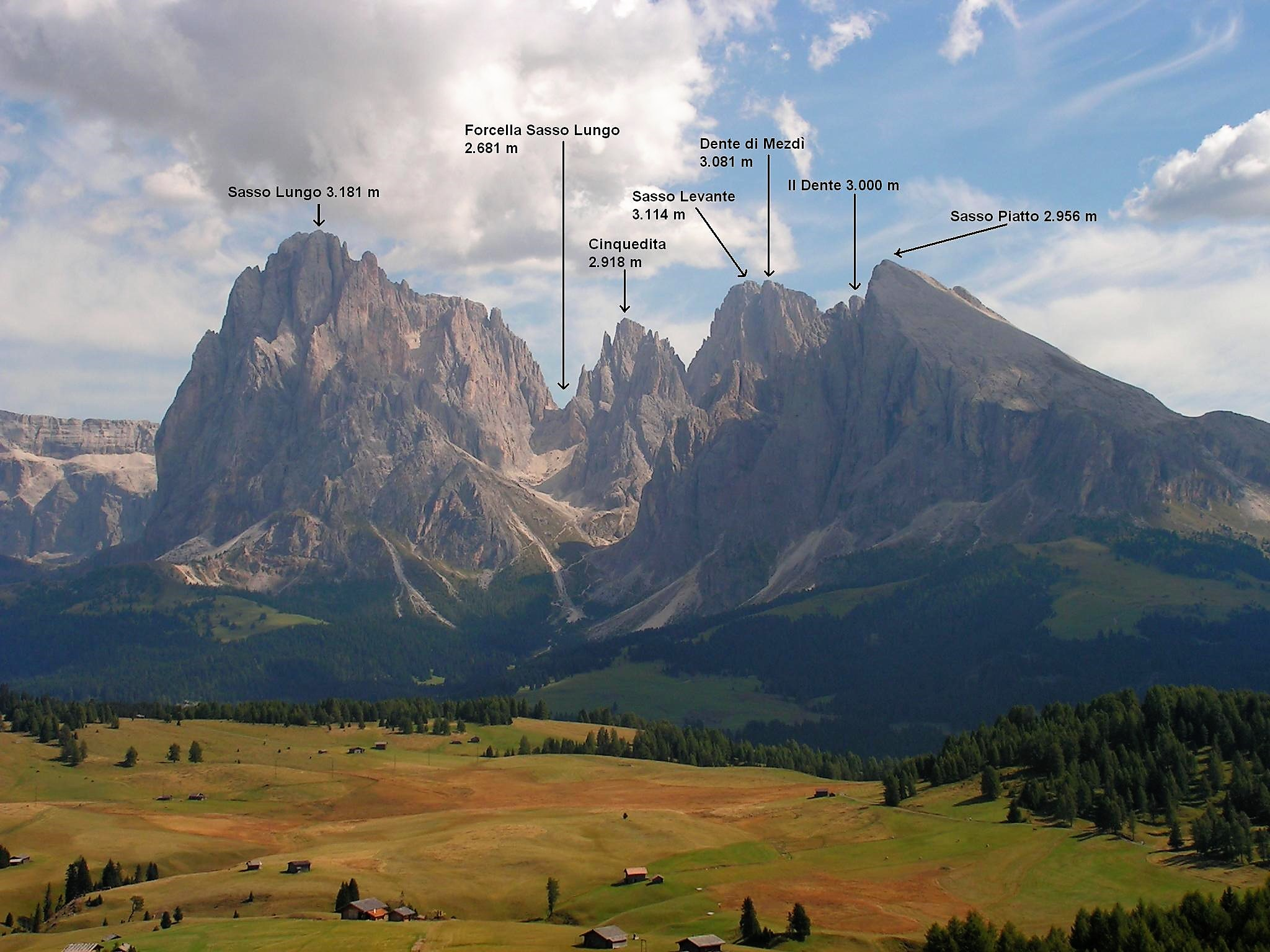
Langkofel Group, labelled

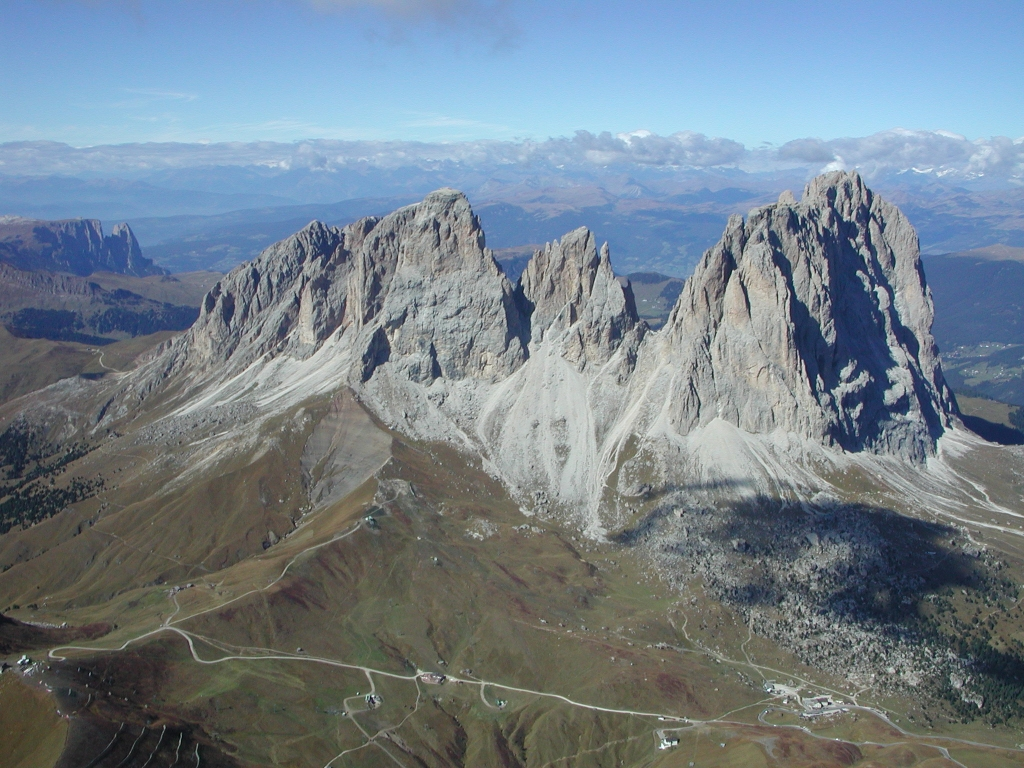
Aerial photograph of the Langkofel Group

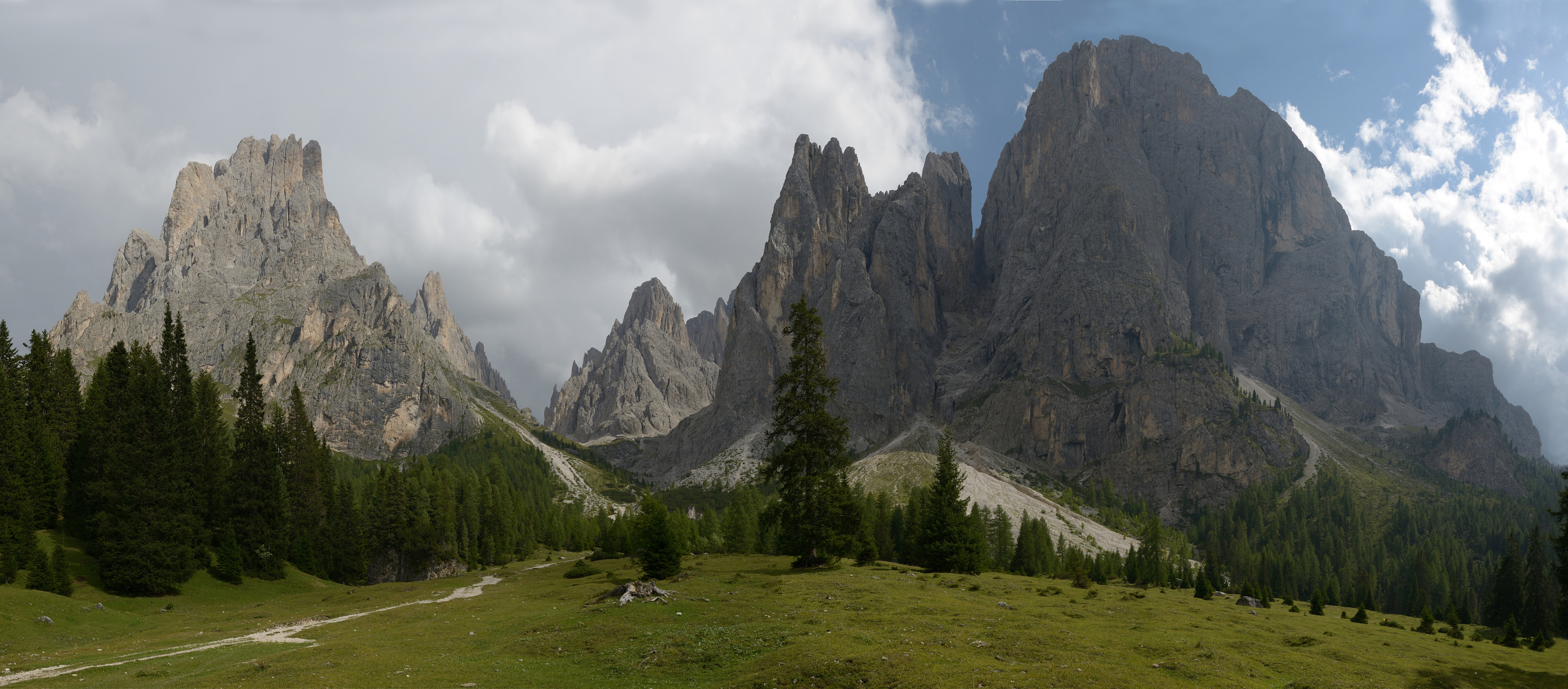
The group seen from the Plans de Cunfin

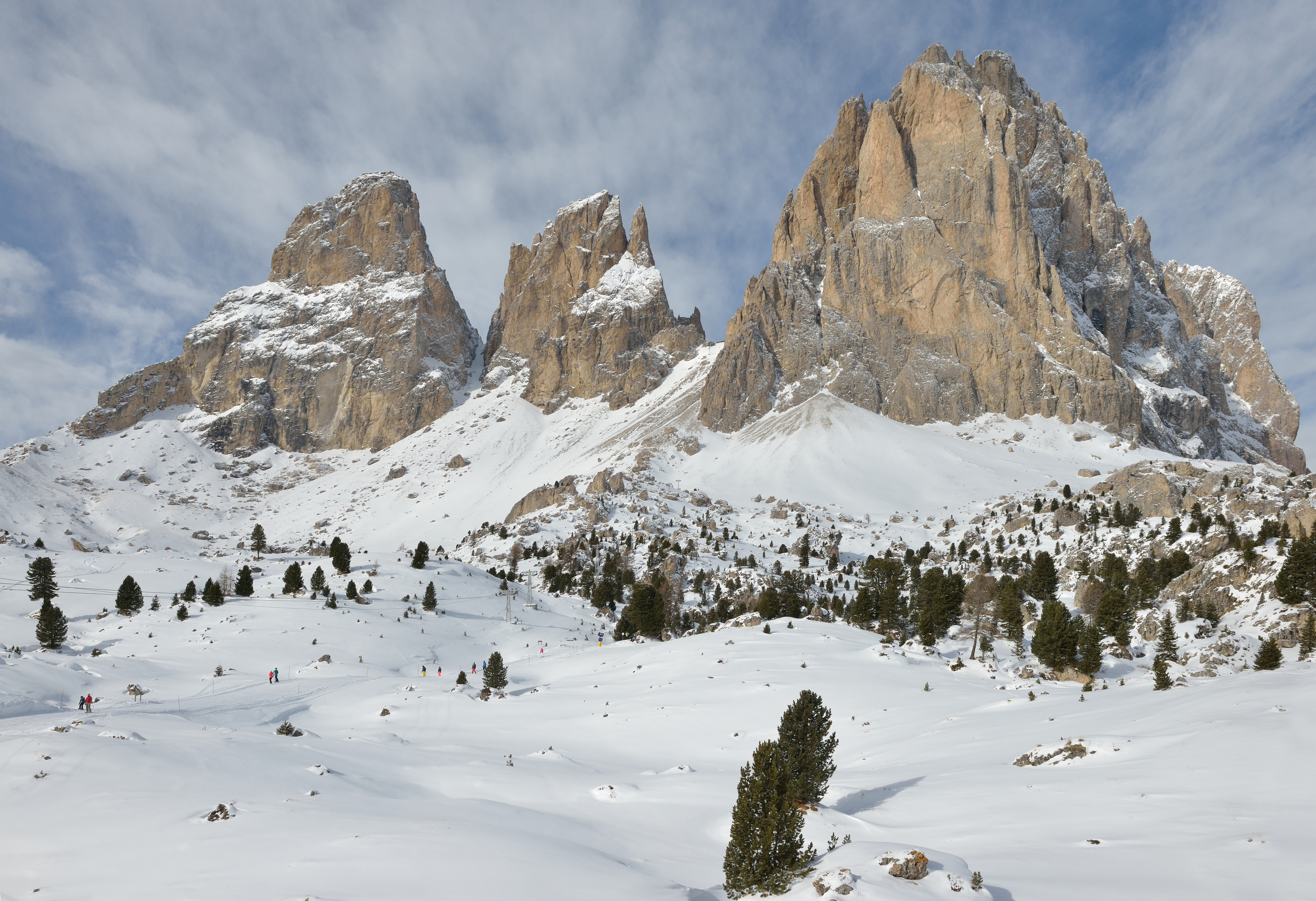
The Langkofel Group from the Sella pass

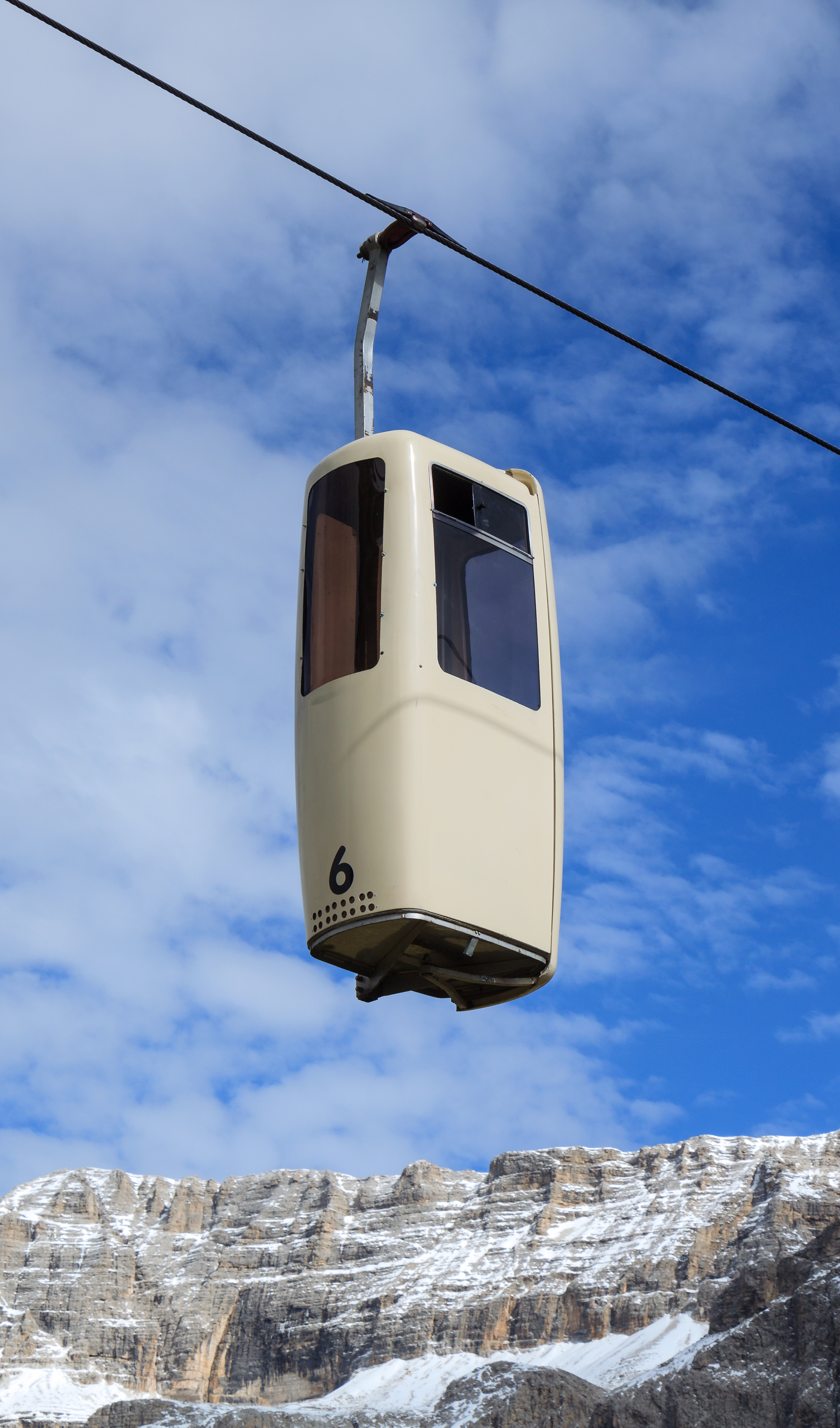
Gondola of the Telecabin Forcella del Sassolungo

== Alpine huts ==
- Langkofel Hut (2256 m, also Rifugio Vicenza, in the Langkofel Cirque (Langkofelkar))
- Emilio Comici Hut (2153 m, private, at the foot of the Langkofel)
- Toni Demetz Hut (2685 m, private, in the Langkofel Col (Langkofelscharte))
- Friedrich August Hut (2298 m, private, on the Friedrich August Way from Sellajoch to the Plattkofel Hut)
- Des Alpes Hut (2395 m, private, on the Rodella Col, cable car from Campitello di Fassa)
- Sandro Pertini Hut (2300 m, private, on the Frederick Augustus Way (Friedrich-August-Weg))
- Plattkofel Hut (2300 m, private, west of the Plattkofel)
- Schutzhaus Sellajoch (2180 m, private, on the road to the Sellajoch below the top of the pass)
- Williams Hut (2100 m, private, at the foot of the Plattkofel)

== Tourism ==
In Summer a gondola lift runs from Sellajoch up to the col of Langkofelscharte and the Toni Demetz refuge hut. From there both the Langkofel (via the Langkofel Hut, Confinböden and the Emilio Comici Hut), as well as the Plattkofel (via the Langkofel Hut, Plattkofel Hut and Frederick Augustus Way) may be circled on hiking trails. The Plattkofel may be reached from the Langkofelkar on the klettersteig route known as the Oskar Schuster Steig and from the Plattkofel Hut over the steep western flank (here without climbing). Between the Langkofel and the Sellajoch is the area of rockslides known as the "Rocky Town" (Steinernen Stadt), notable especially for its rich flora.

In winter there are ski areas at the foot of the Langkofel Group: the Col Rodella (on the Sellajoch), Plan de Gralba, Ciampinoi (with its well-known Saslong world cup run) and Monte Pana/Mont de Sëura. The famous Sella Ronda, a circuit of the Sella Group on ski pistes both clockwise and anticlockwise, also runs over these pistes.

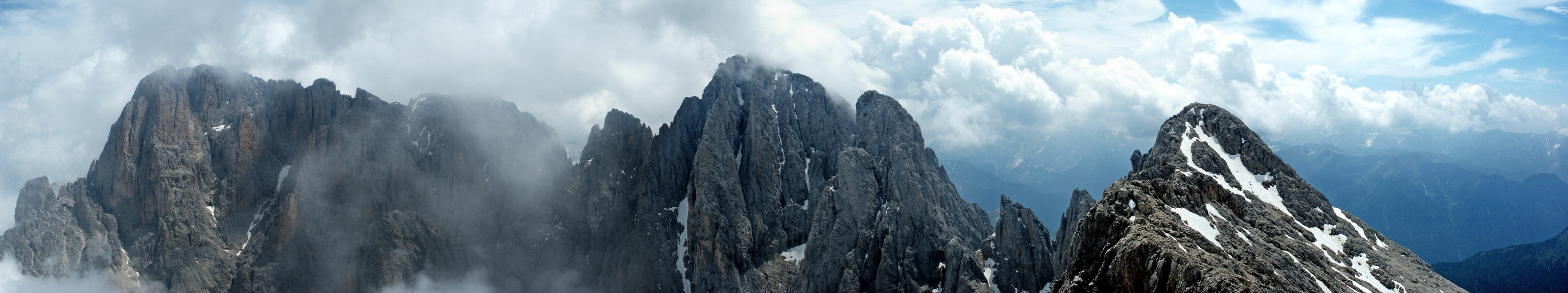
The summit region seen from the Plattkofel
