= Fünffingerspitze =

Mountain in Italy

- Punta delle Cinque Dita
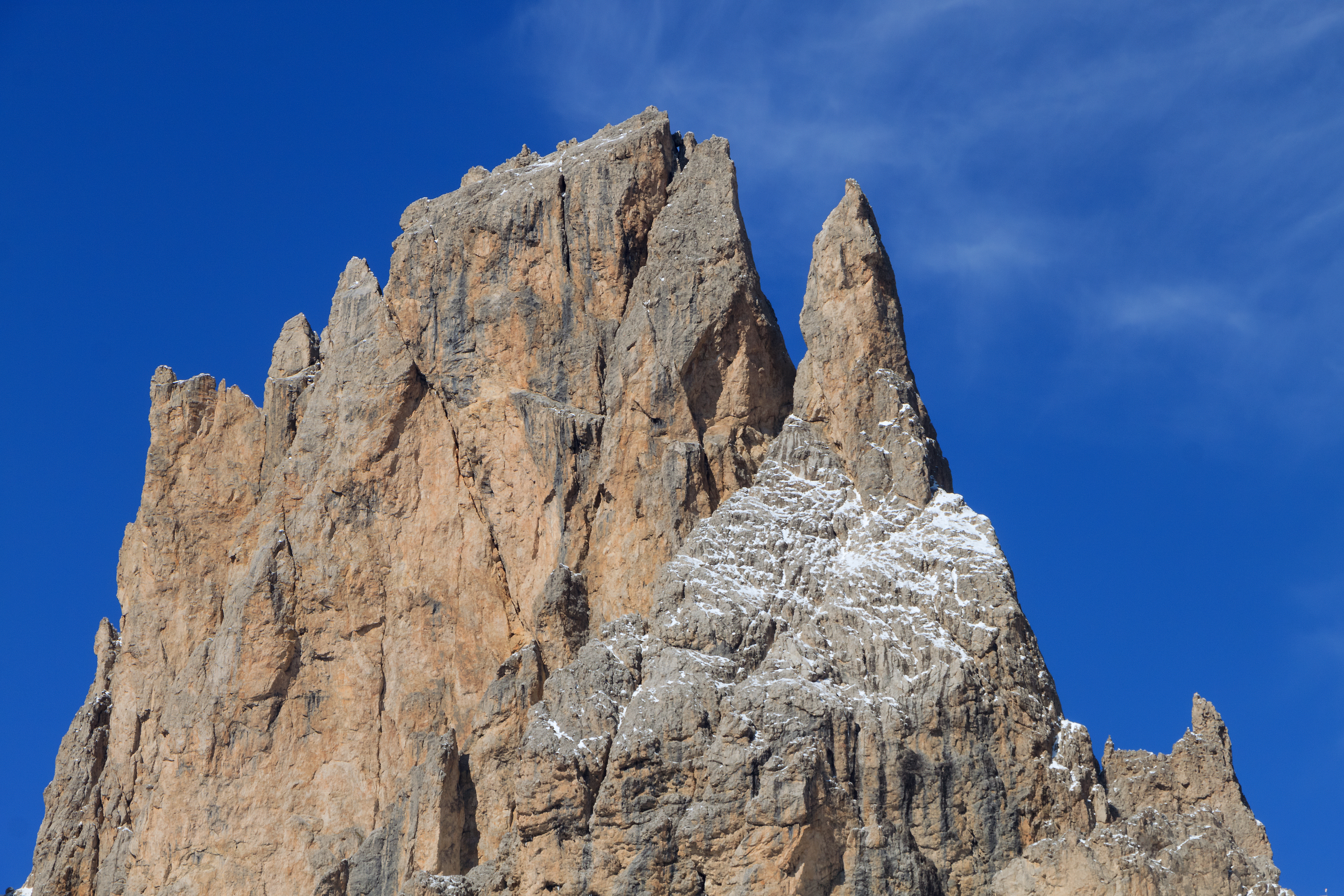

Highest point
- Elevation: 2,996 m (9,829 ft)
- Coordinates: 46°30′49″N 11°44′14″E

Geography
- Location within Alps
- Location: South Tyrol, Italy
- Parent range: Dolomites

Climbing
- First ascent: Johann Santner and Robert Hans Schmitt, 1890

Fünffingerspitze (Italian: Punta delle Cinque Dita; Ladin: Pizes di Cin Dëic; 2,996 m (9,829 ft)) is a mountain in the Langkofel Group of the Dolomites in Italy, It stands above the Sella Pass and lies on the border between Trentino and South Tyrol. The name translates to "five finger peak".

The name is derived from the resemblance of the rock towers which make up the peak rock towers to the fingers of a hand. At the north is the thumb which is frequently climbed as an independent tower, 2,953 m (9,688 ft).

== Climbing ==
The ascent of the mountain involves alpine mountaineering and requires specialist equipment and experience. The normal route starts at the Sella Pass, about 2,200 m (7,200 ft) above sea level. Johann Santner and Robert Hans Schmitt were the first to reach the summit in 1890. They ascended by the Schmittkamin route (the "Schmitt chminey") which is rated UIAA 4+.

The traverse of the Fünffingerspitze, crossing the top of each of the towers, is a classic middle grade climb first completed in full by Gustav Jahn, Erwin Merlet and Karl Huter in 1917 (UIAA 4).

Ludwig Norman-Neruda died from serious injuries caused by a fall from the peak in 1898. He had made six previous ascents of the peak.
