= Pizes de Cir =

Mountain range South Tyrol, Italy

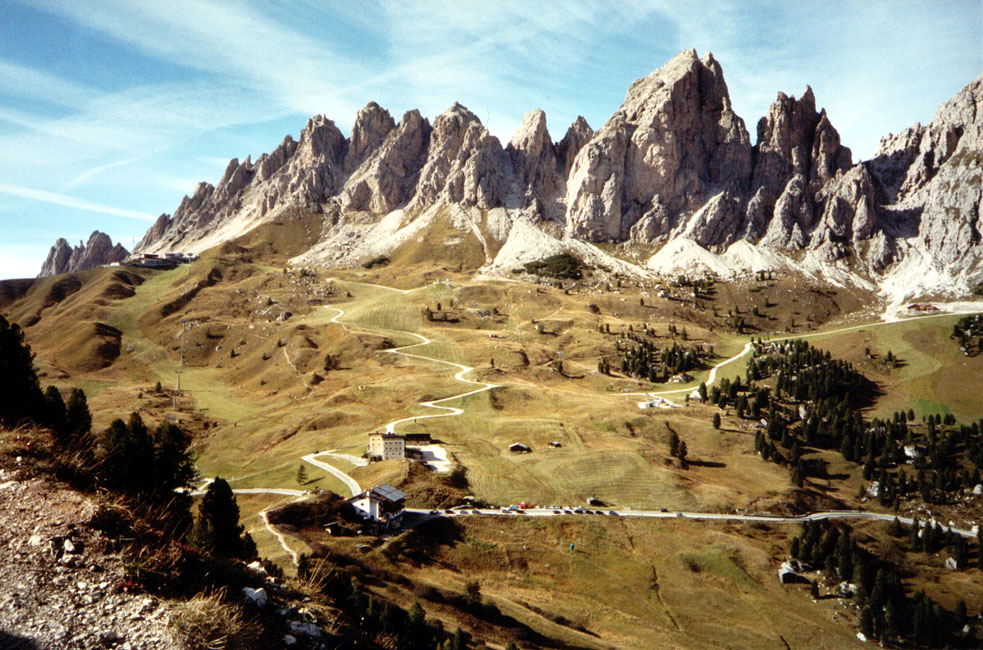
- Pizes de Cir from Gardena Pass

Highest point
- Elevation: 2,592 m (8,504 ft)
- Coordinates: 46°33′31.5″N 11°48′10.0″E

Geography
- Location: South Tyrol, Italy
- Parent range: Dolomites

The Pizes de Cir (Ladin: Pizes de Cir; Italian: Gruppo del Cir Italian pronunciation: [ˈɡruppo del ˈtʃir]; German: Cirspitzen) is a mountain range in South Tyrol, Italy. They are part of the Dolomites, north of Gardena Pass. The highest peak of this mountain range is the Gran Cir with an elevation of 2592 meters.

== Gran Cir ==
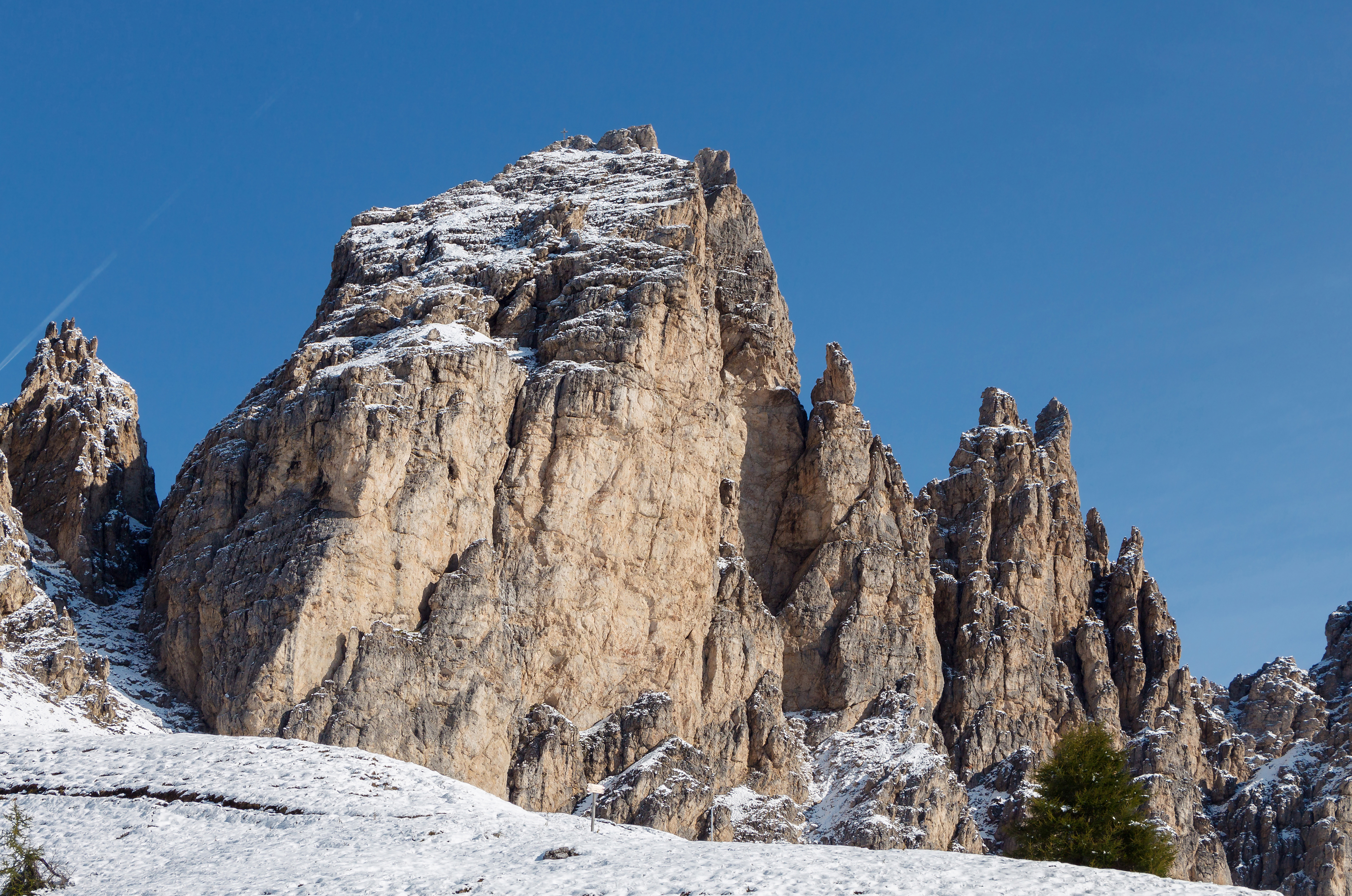
Gran Cir

The first tourist ascent to the peak took place on 7 August 1887 by Johann Santner and Gottfried Merzbacher from the west side. Today the Gran Cir is accessible via the normal route, a path not requiring climbing experience. The way leads first through a gravel field, then along a wall and high up to the summit. In some places, the way is secured with a wire. The top is marked with a large cross.

== Piccolo Cir ==
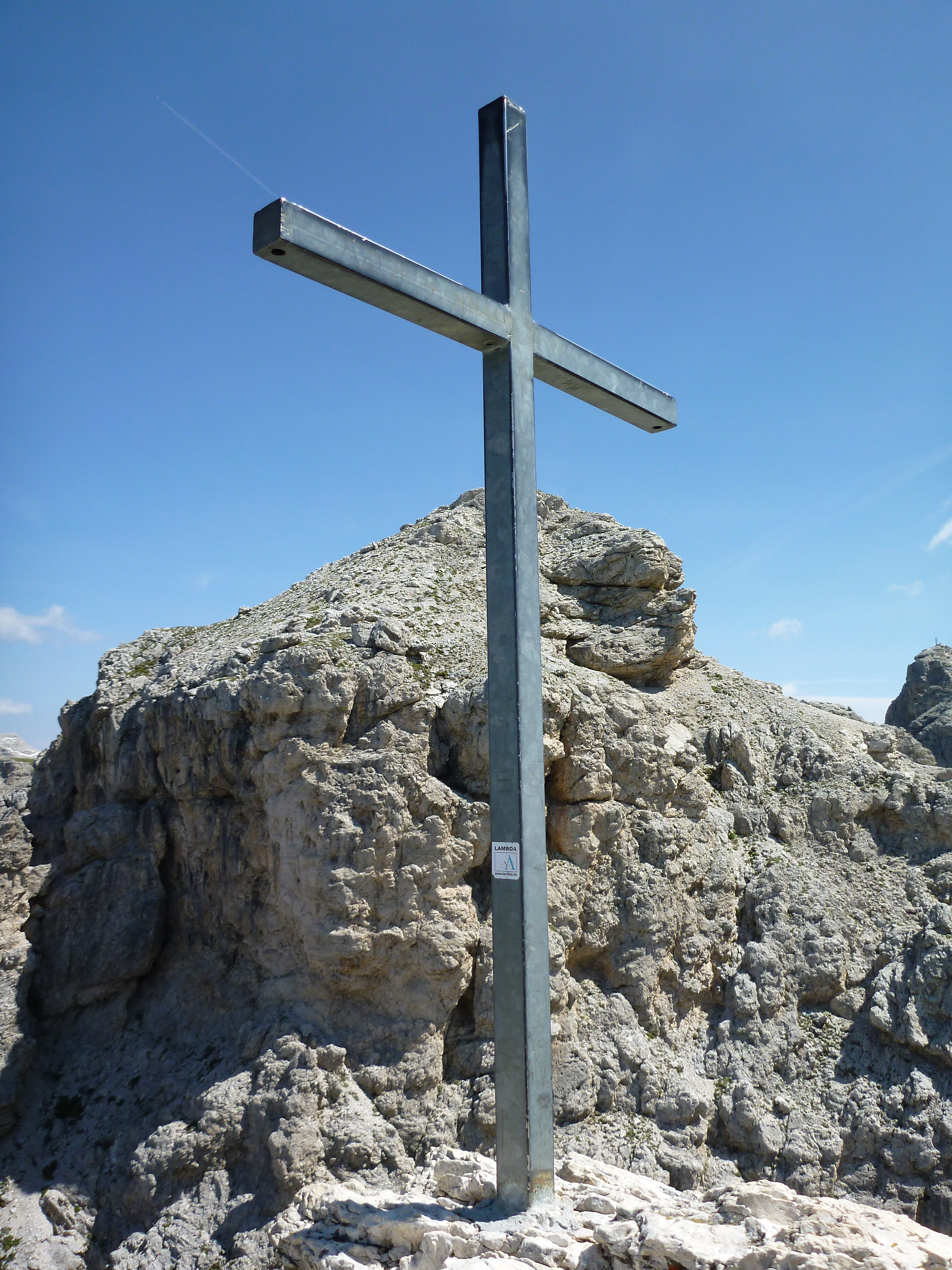
Peak of the Piccolo Cir

The peak of the Small Cir Italian: Piccolo Cir has an elevation of 2520 meters. This peak is east of Gran Cir, close to the mountain station of the Dantercepies cable car. The top is marked with a small cross. It can be reached via a relatively easy via ferrata(B/C). The path leads, secured, from the eastern side to the summit, and then unsecured on the western side down again through a gravel field.

== Vicinity ==
- From the Cir pass it is possible to descent to the Val Longia (Vallunga/Langetal) through the Val de Chedul, north of the ridge.
- From Gardena Pass the Pizes de Cir can be reached via different paths.
- Below the ridge, at an elevation of 2220 meters, is the Jimmyhütte.

== Panorama ==
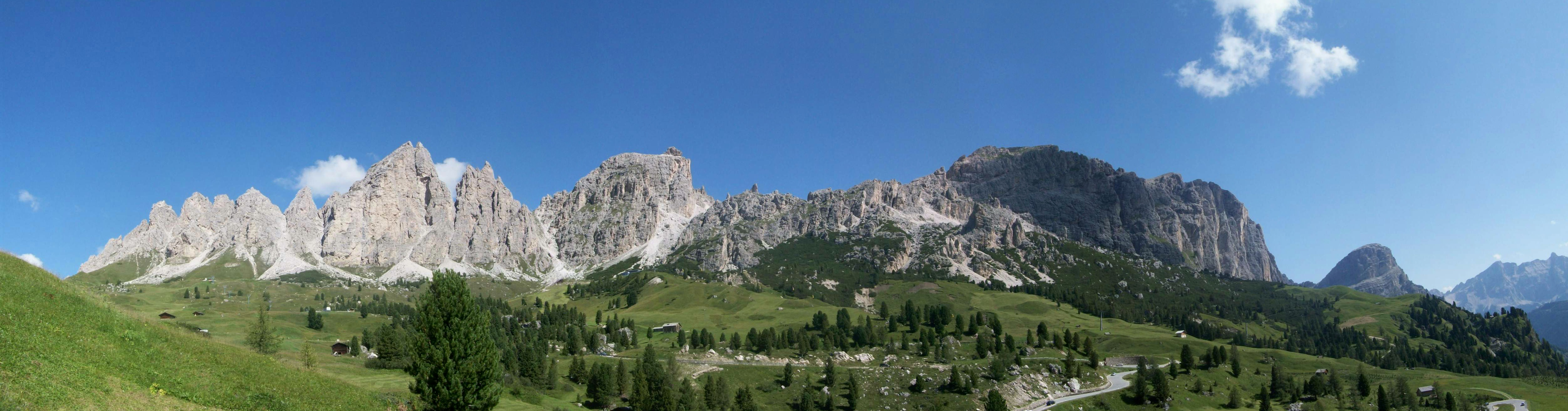
Panoramic view of Pizes de Cir from Gardena Pass.

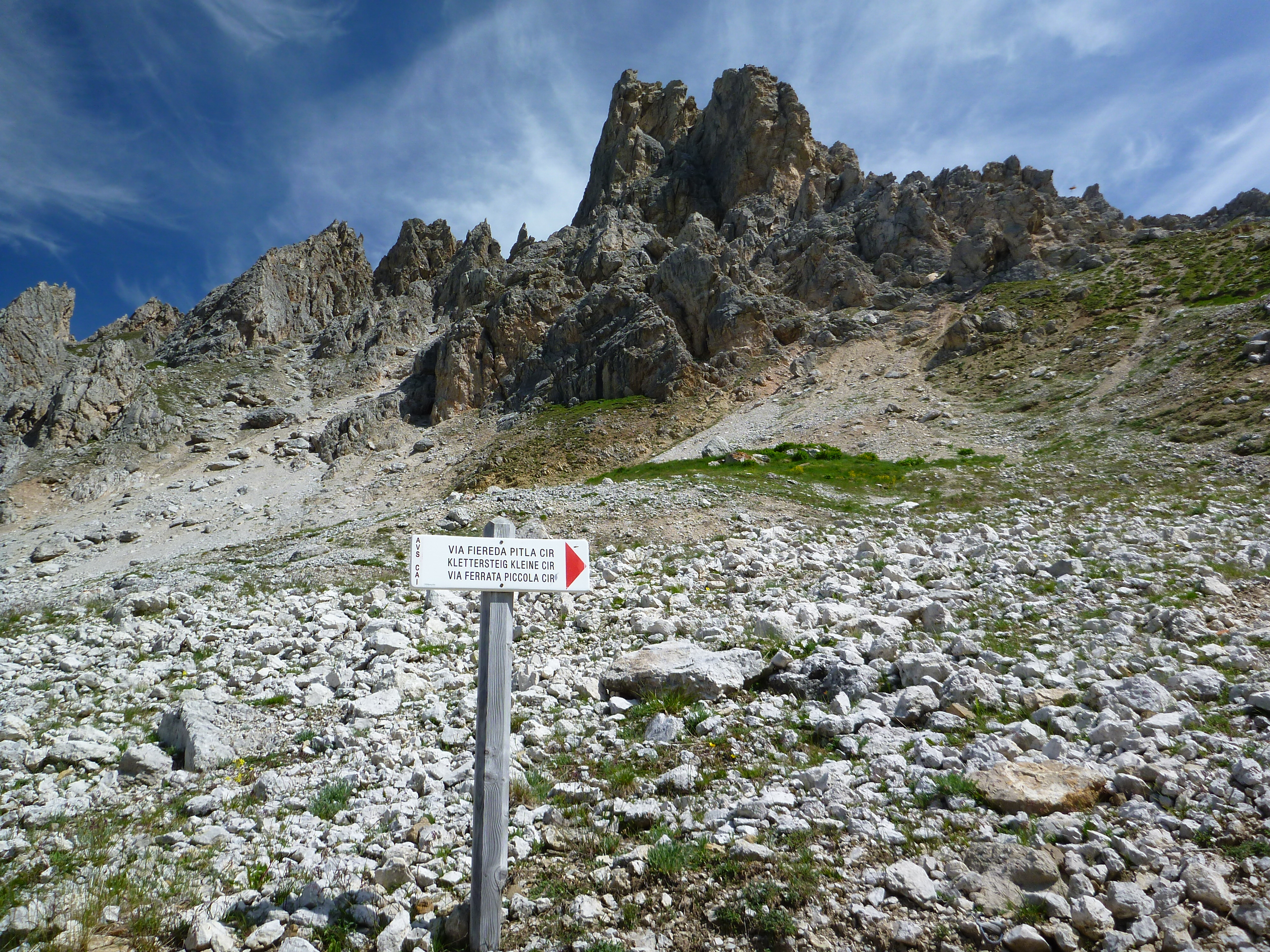
Sign to the via ferrata. Piccola Cir in background
