= Paul Grohmann =

Austrian mountaineer and writer (1838–1908)

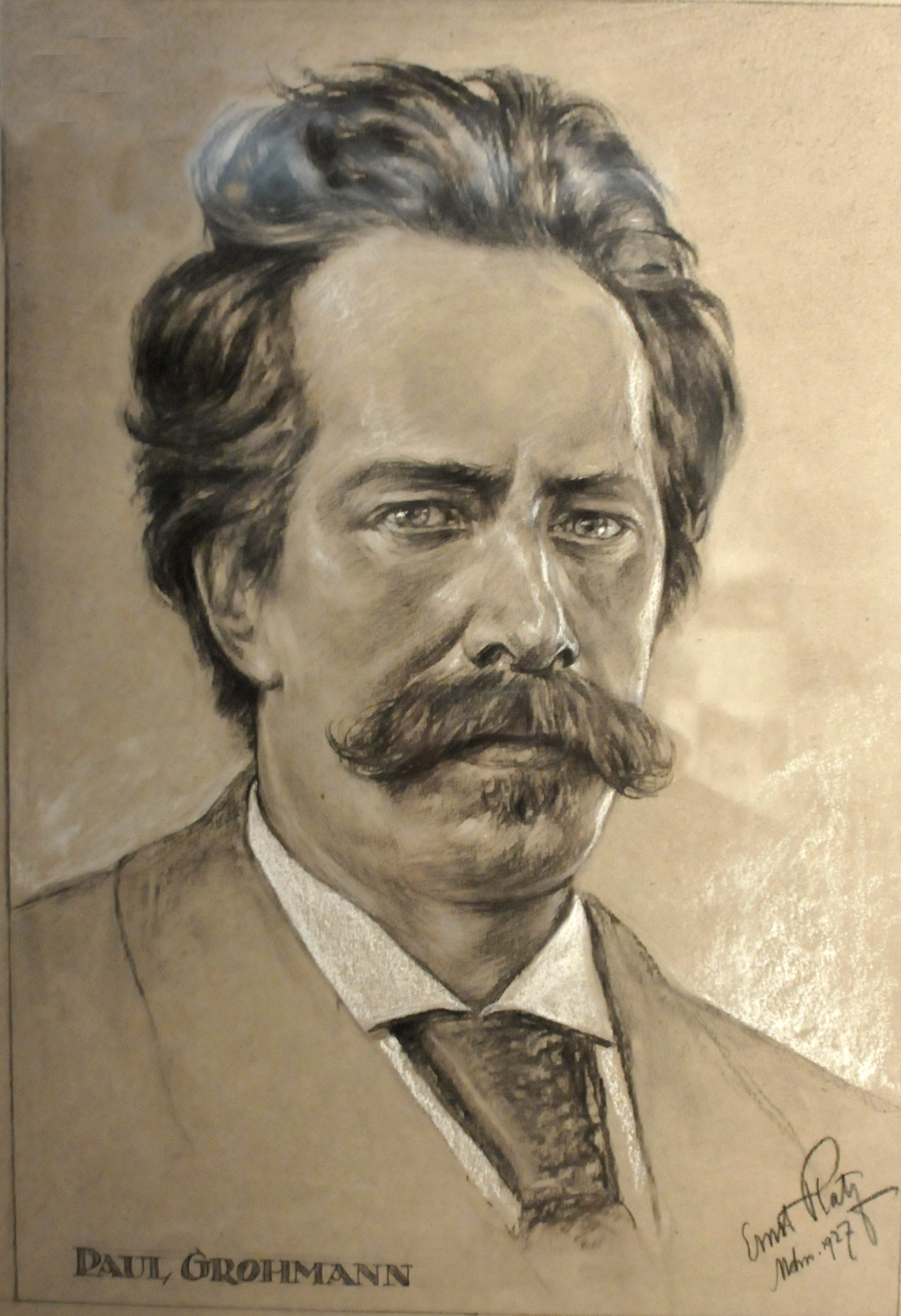

Personal information
- Nationality: Austrian
- Born: 12 June 1838 Vienna, Austrian Empire
- Died: 29 July 1908 (aged 70) Vienna
- Occupations: Mountaineer, writer

Climbing career
- Known for: Dolomites first ascents

Paul Grohmann (12 June 1838 – 29 July 1908) was an Austrian mountaineer and writer.

== Biography ==
Grohmann was a pioneer in exploring technically challenging mountains and is thought to have made more first ascents of Eastern Alps summits than anyone else. Among these are the four highest summits in the Dolomites. In 1862, Grohman, Friedrich Simony and Edmund von Mojsvár founded the Austrian Alpine Club. This was the second mountaineering club in the world, following the founding of the British Alpine Club in 1857.

In 1875, he published a detailed map of the Dolomites (Karte der Dolomit-Alpen) and, in 1877, the travel book Wanderungen in den Dolomiten, which significantly stimulated mountain tourism in the area.

In his honor, the as yet unclimbed Sasso di Levante in the Langkofel Dolomites was renamed Grohmannspitze in 1875. The west peak of the Kellerspitzen in the Carnic Alps, which he first-ascended in 1868, is also known as Grohmannspitze. Already in 1898, 10 years before his death, the town of Urtijëi erected a monument to honor his many first ascents in the Dolomites. Since 1984 there is a Grohmann street in Vienna's Donaustadt district.

== First ascents ==
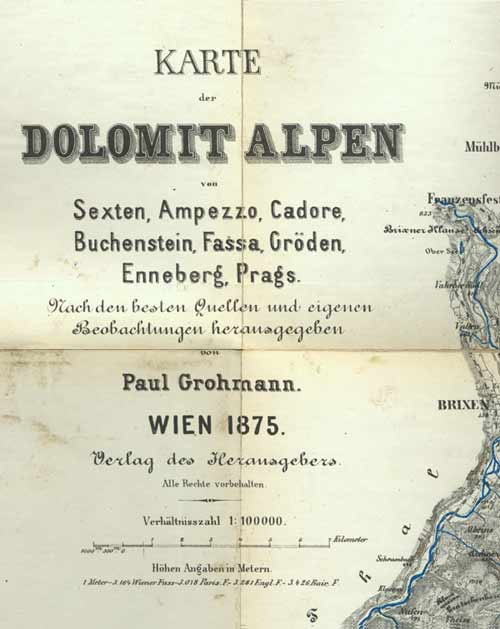
Grohmann's map of 1875

Among the many peaks he and his guides were the first to ascend are:

- Hochalmspitze in the Hohe Tauern (15 August 1859) with guides "Lenzbauer" and Franz Moidele
- Tofana di Mezzo in the Dolomites (29 August 1863), with the guide it:Francesco Lacedelli
- Antelao (Dolomites) (18 September 1863) with guides Francesco and Alessandro Lacedelli and Matteo Ossi
- Boespitze (Dolomites) (30 July 1864) with G. Irschara (though previously climbed by hunters)
- Tofana di Rozes (Dolomites) (29 August 1864) with Francesco Lacedelli, it:Angelo Dimai and Santo Siorpaes
- Sorapiss (Dolomites) (16 September 1864) with Francesco Lacedelli and Angelo Dimai
- Marmolada (Dolomites) (28 September 1864) with guides Angelo and Fulgentio Dimai
- Hochfeiler (Zillertal Alps) (24 Juli 1865) with the guides Josele Samer and Peter Fuchs
- Monte Cristallo (Dolomites) (14 September 1865), with guides Santo Siorpaes and Angelo Dimai
- Hohe Warte (Carnic Alps) (30 September 1865) with Nicolò Sottocorona and "the farmer Hofer"
- Olperer (Zillertal Alps) (10 September 1867) with guides Josele Samer and Gainer Jackele
- Kellerwand (Carnic Alps) (14 July 1868) with Josef Moser and Peter Salcher
- Dreischusterspitze (Dolomites) (18 July 1869) with guides Peter Salcher and de:Franz Innerkofler
- Langkofel (Dolomites) (13 August 1869) with guides Peter Salcher and Franz Innerkofler
- Große Zinne (Dolomites) (21 August 1869), with guides Franz Innerkofler and Peter Salcher
