= Grohmannspitze =

Mountain in Italy

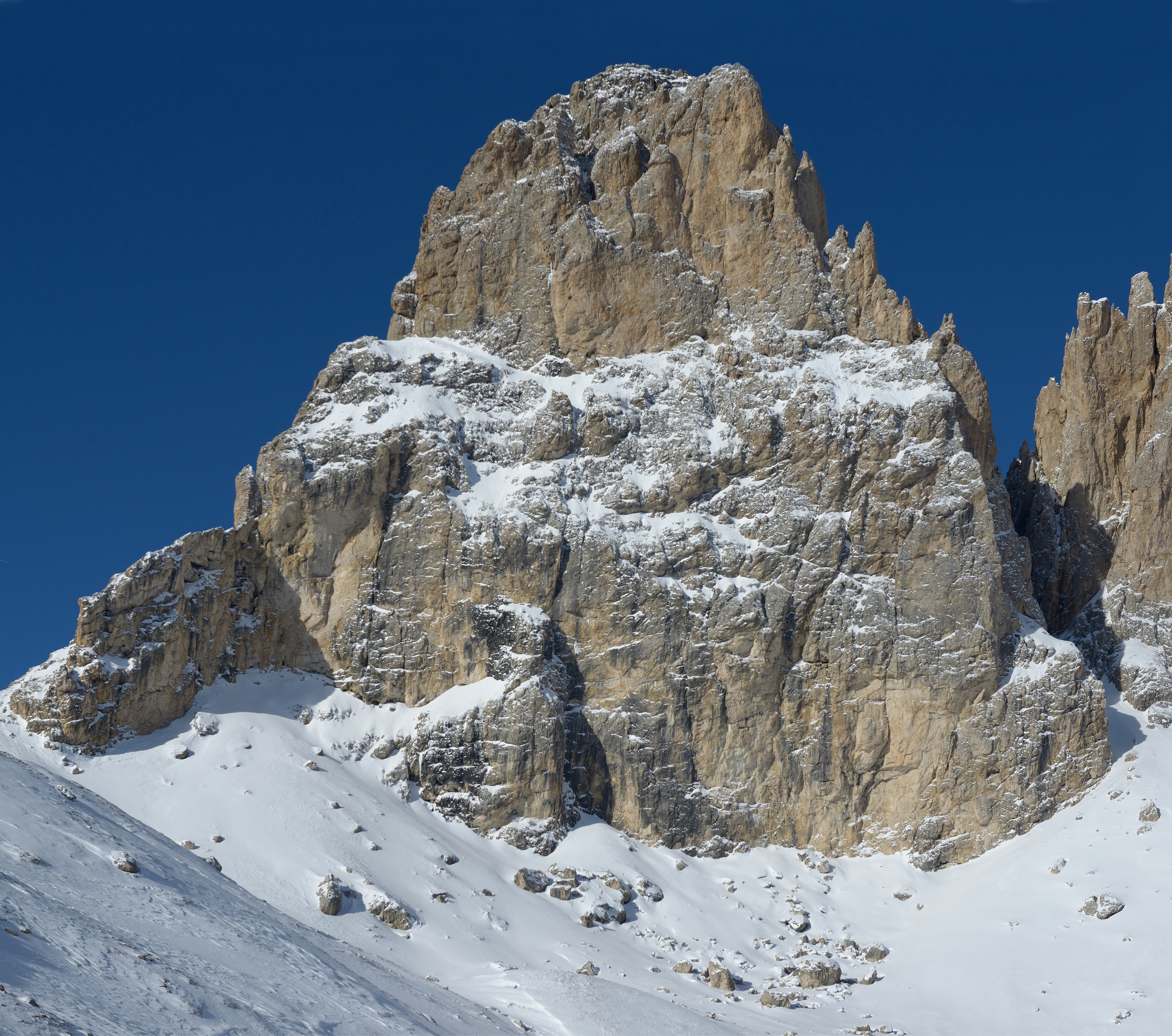
- The east face of the Grohmannspitze

Highest point
- Elevation: 3,126 m (10,256 ft)
- Prominence: 444 m (1,457 ft)
- Listing: Alpine mountains above 3000 m
- Coordinates: 46°30′40″N 11°44′4″E

Geography
- Location within Alps
- Location: South Tyrol, Italy
- Parent range: Dolomites

Climbing
- First ascent: 1880 by Michel Innerkofler

The Grohmannspitze (Italian: Punta Grohmann; German: Grohmannspitze) is a mountain in the Langkofel Group of the Dolomites in South Tyrol, Italy.

The mountain was named for mountaineer Paul Grohmann.
