= Johann Santner =

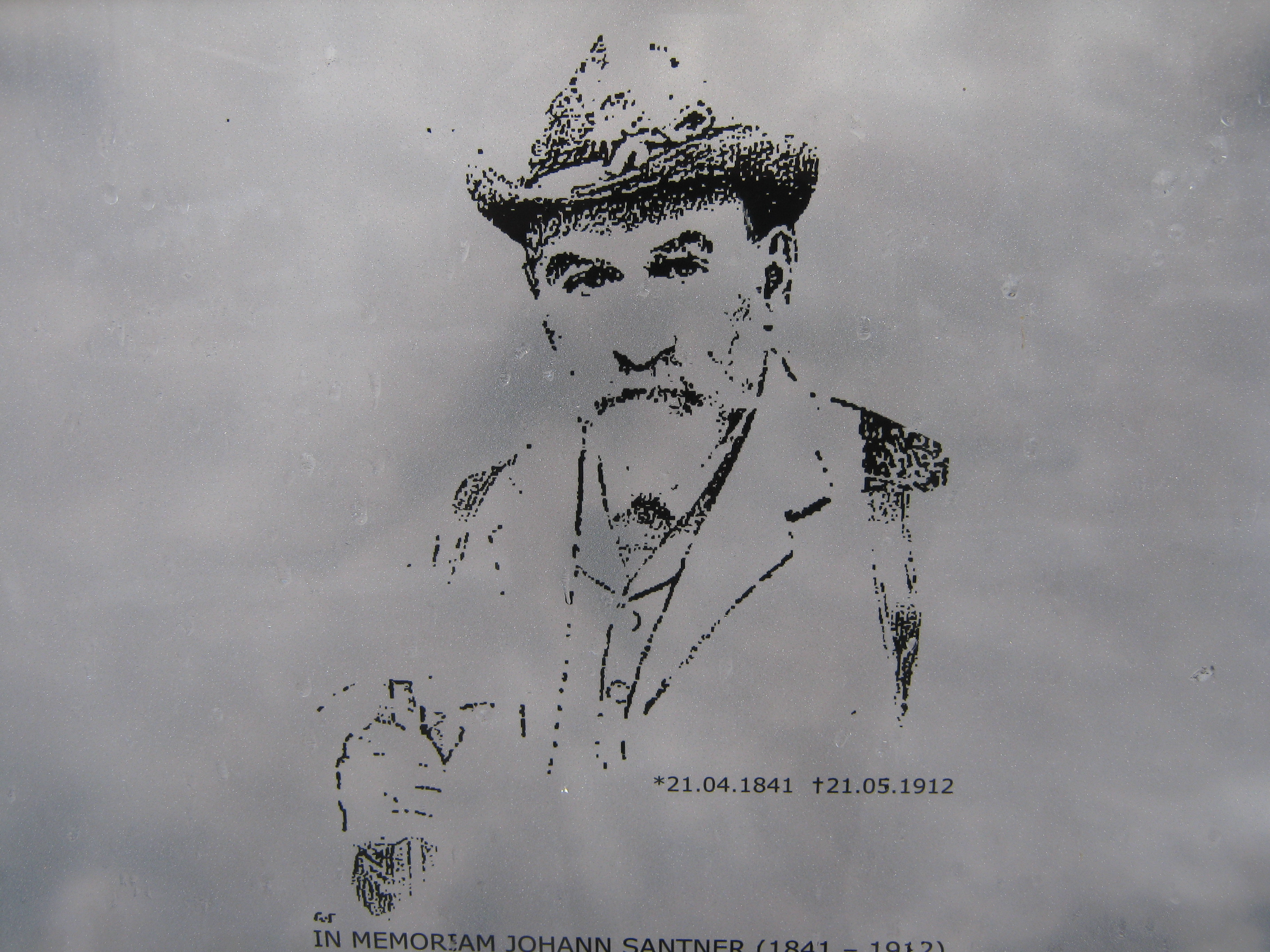

Johann Santner (21 April, 1840 in Sankt Jakob in Defereggen - 21 May, 1912 in Bozen) was a Tyrolean mountaineer and first climber to reach the summit of the Santnerspitze, which was later given his name in his honor, of the Schlern on 2 July, 1880. He also was the first climber on the Gran Cir.

== Life ==
Johann Santner came to Bozen in 1875 as a florist. In 1876 he became a member of the local branch of the Deutscher und Österreichischer Alpenverein. The Schlern was his favorite mountain, he climbed it over 400 times - the last time in 1911 at the age of 71.
