= Langkofel =

Mountain in Italy

Saslonch
- Sassolungo / Langkofel

Highest point
- Elevation: 3,181 m (10,436 ft)
- Prominence: 1,124 m (3,688 ft)
- Isolation: 11.82 km (7.34 mi)
- Listing: Alpine mountains above 3000 m
- Coordinates: 46°31′29″N 11°44′7″E

Geography
- Location within Alps
- Location: South Tyrol, Italy
- Parent range: Dolomites

Climbing
- First ascent: 1869

Saslonch ([laŋˈkofl]; Italian: Sassolungo [ˌsassoˈluŋɡo]; German: Langkofel; 3,181 m) is the highest mountain of the Langkofel Group in the Dolomites in South Tyrol, Italy. The name translates to "long peak" / "long rock" in all three languages. It stands over the Ladin community of Val Gardena.

== Climbing ==
The ascent of the mountain is an alpine mountaineering ascent requiring specialist equipment and experience. The normal route starts at the Sella Pass, about 2,200 m above sea level. Paul Grohmann was the first to reach the summit in 1869.

In 1911, Angelo Dibona opened a route on the northwest face, reaching the summit of the Campanile Ovest. The “Dibona route” is considered one of his greatest achievements. As of today, it is an almost unknown route.

In 1918, E. Pichl and R. Walzer climbed the north ridge of the Campanile Nord, a route that has since become a classic.

The northwest pillar was first climbed in 1966 by Pietro Sommavilla and Giovanni Viel.

Ivo Rabanser and Marco Furlani established a route called "Pilastro Magno" on the northeast face in 1993.

In January 2013, alpine guides Adam Holzknecht and Hubert Moroder completed the first ascent of “La Legrima,” an ice and mixed climbing route on the north face.
