= Plattkofel =

Mountain in Italy

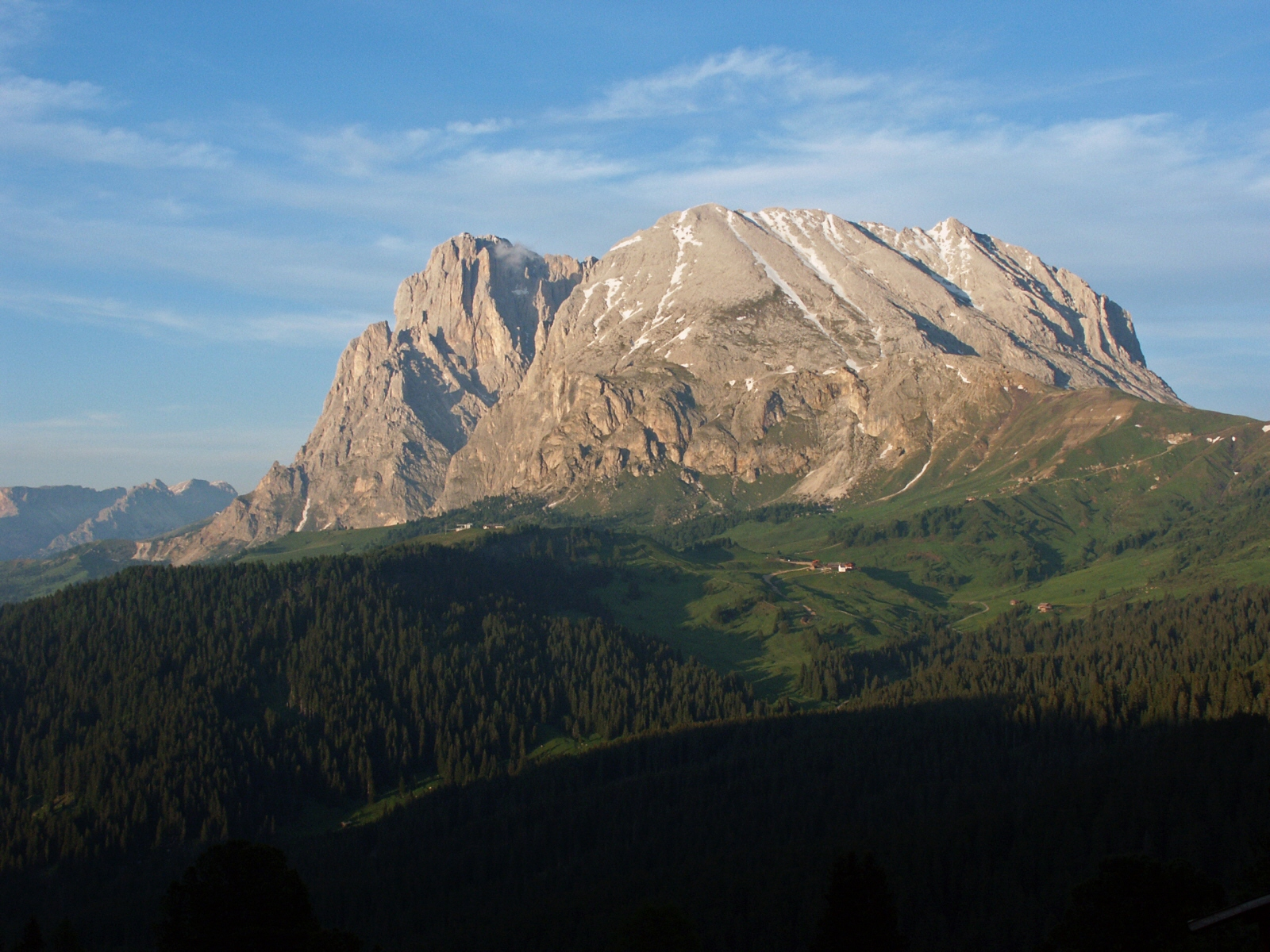

Highest point
- Elevation: 2,969 m (9,741 ft)
- Coordinates: 46°30′59″N 11°42′44″E

Geography
- Location: South Tyrol, Italy
- Parent range: Dolomites

The Plattkofel (Ladin: Sasplat; Italian: Sasso Piatto; German: Plattkofel) is a mountain in the Dolomites in South Tyrol, Italy.
