= Cima Palon =

Mountain in Italy

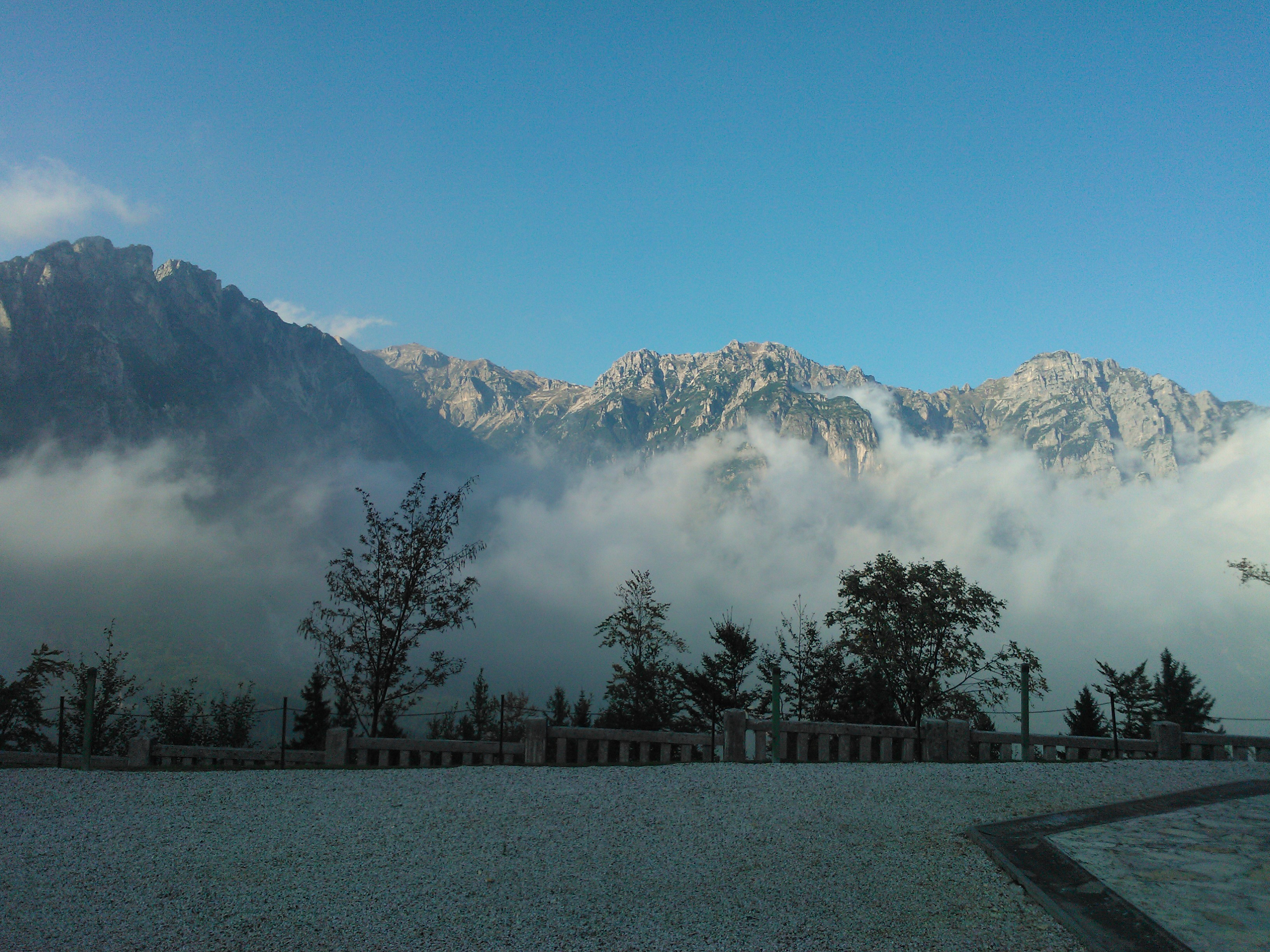

Highest point
- Elevation: 2,239 m (7,346 ft)
- Coordinates: 45°47′31.25″N 11°10′35.35″E

Geography
- Location within Italy
- Location: Veneto, Italy

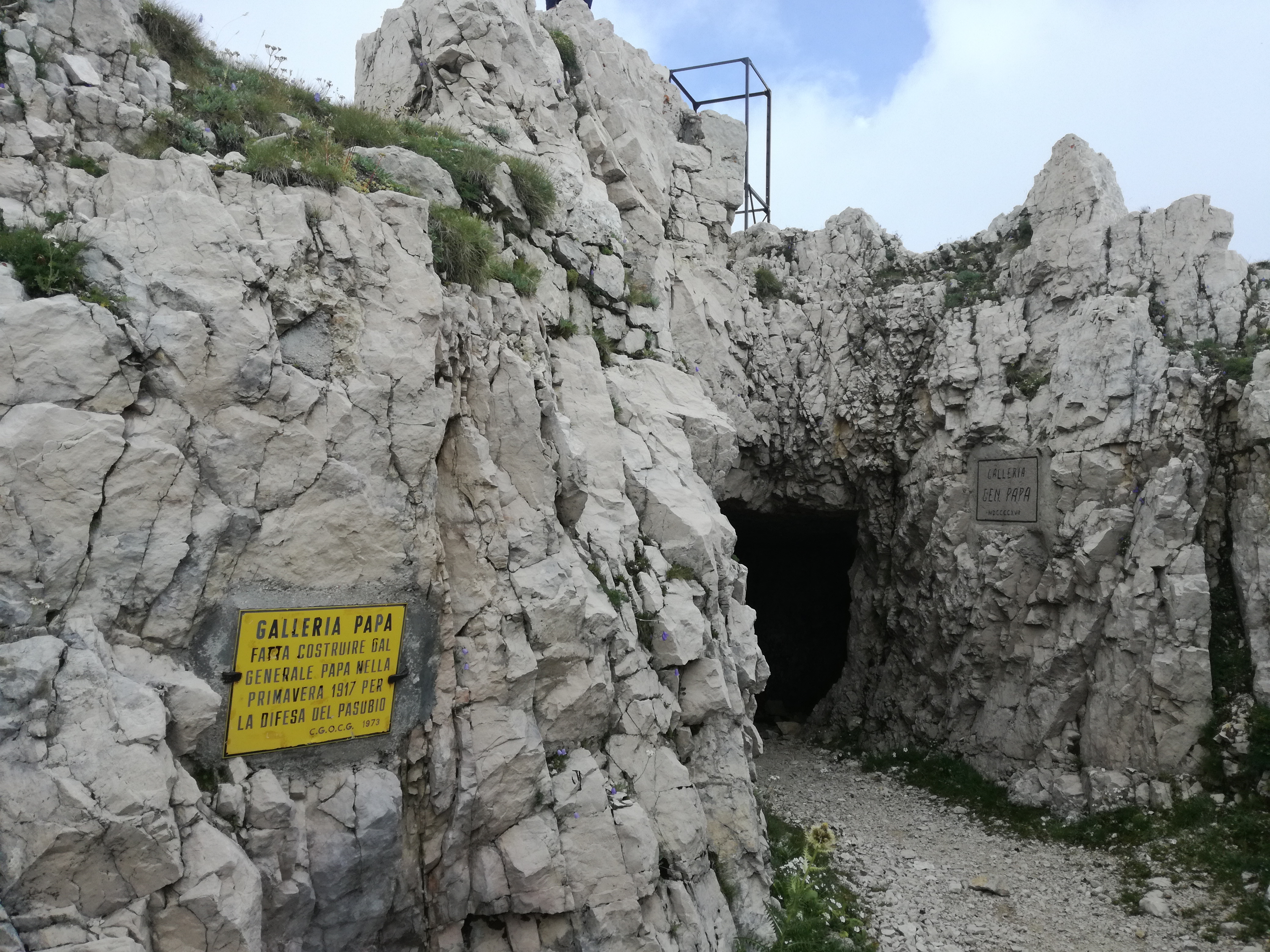
Cima Palon - Entrance to World War 1 galleries cut into limestone

Cima Palon, also called Monte Pasubio, is the highest peak of the Pasubio group of Little Dolomites in Veneto, Italy. It has an elevation of 2,239 metres.

The Pasubio plateau is one of the most relevant Little Dolomites massifs, and it held a highly strategic role during the Great War (1914-1918), since it represented the last defensive position of the Venetian Plain. It was the site of fierce mine warfare on the Italian Front. In May 1916, after the Austro-Hungarian Strafexpedition, an Italian contingent was urgently transferred from the Isonzo Front and under the command of General Achille Papa, they stopped the Austro-Hungarian Army at Cima Palon.

In 1917, a team of Italian miners built the Strada delle 52 Gallerie, the route of 52 tunnels, which leads from the base to the summit area of Monte Pasubio.
