= Mines on the Italian front (World War I) =

Explosives used by tunnelling units

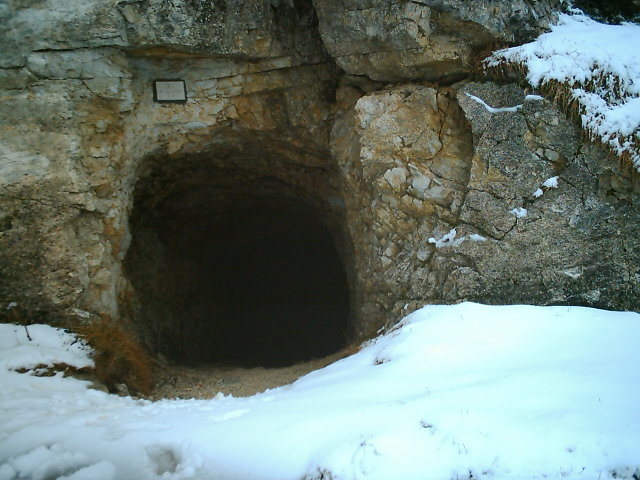
A mine gallery in the ice at Pasubio

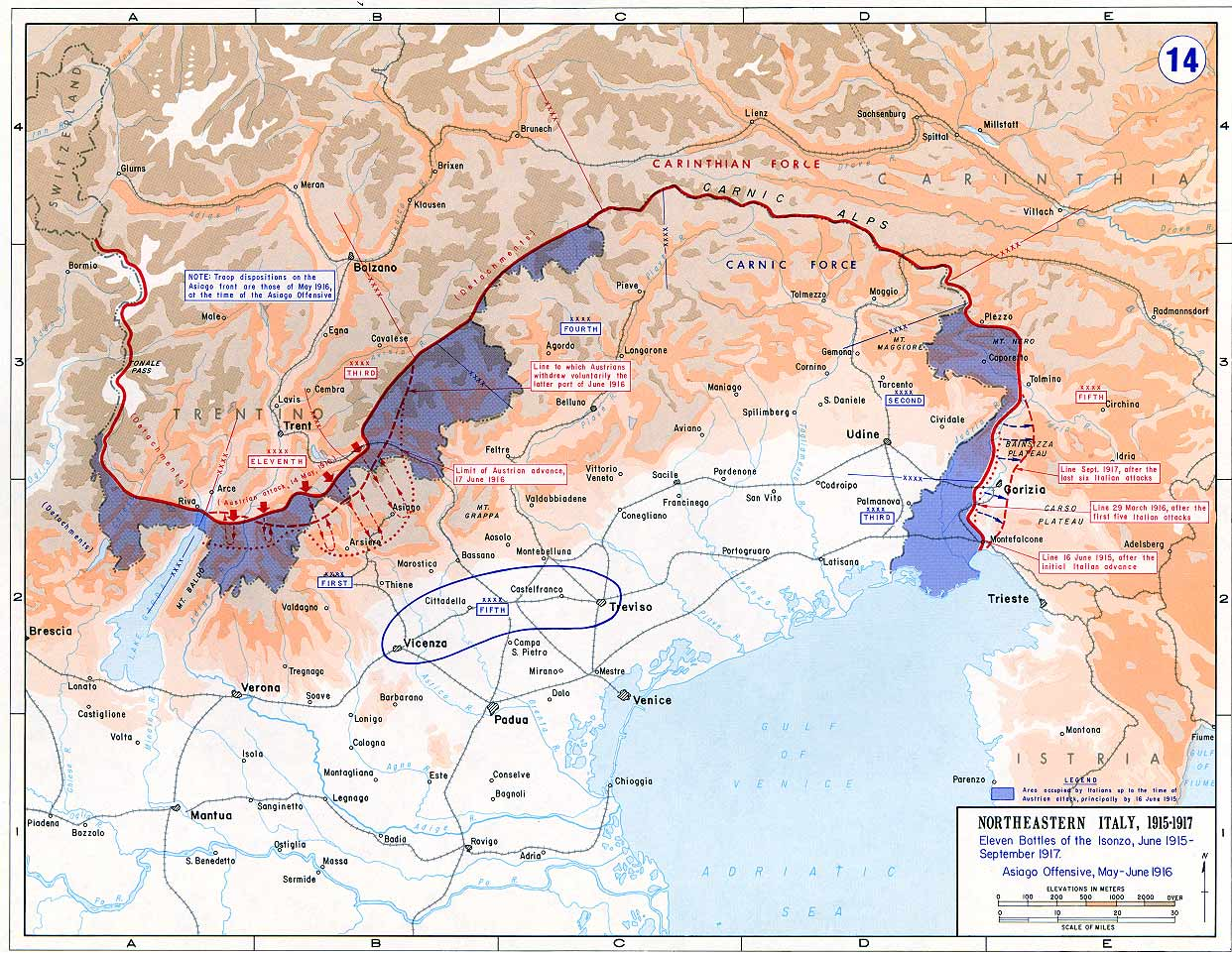
The Italian front in 1915–1917, initial Italian conquests shown in blue

The mines on the Italian front during the First World War comprised a series of underground explosive charges of varying sizes, secretly planted between 1916 and 1918 by Austro-Hungarian and Italian tunneling units beneath their enemy's lines along the Italian front in the Dolomite section of the Alps.

== Background ==
From 1915, the high peaks of the Dolomites range were an area of fierce mountain warfare. In order to protect their soldiers from enemy fire and the hostile alpine environment, both Austro-Hungarian and Italian military engineers constructed fighting tunnels which offered a degree of cover and allowed better logistics support. In addition to building underground shelters and covered supply routes for their soldiers (like the Italian Strada delle 52 Gallerie), both sides also attempted to break the stalemate of trench warfare by tunneling under no man's land and laying large quantities of explosives beneath the enemy's positions.

Between 1 January 1916 and 13 March 1918, a total of 34 mines were detonated in this theatre of war. Of these, 20 were Italian mines aimed at Austro-Hungarian targets and 14 were Austro-Hungarian mines aimed at Italian targets. The size of the explosive charges ranged from 110 kilograms (240 lb) to 50,000 kilograms (110,000 lb) of blasting gelatin. The largest Italian mine held 35,000 kilograms (77,000 lb) of explosive.

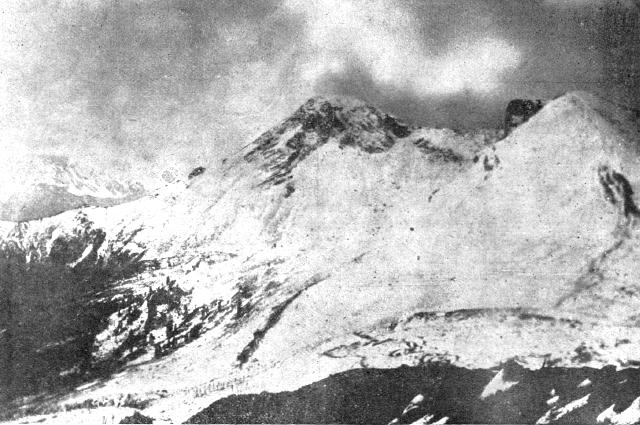
Col di Lana and Monte Sief, 1915

Focal points of the underground fighting during the War in the Dolomites were Pasubio with 10 mines, Lagazuoi with 5, Col di Lana/Monte Sief also with 5, and Marmolada with 4 mines. The most intense episode was the seven-week period from 16 September to 3 November 1917 which saw 12 mine explosions. After November 1917 and the Italian retreat to Monte Grappa and the Piave river in the aftermath of the Battle of Caporetto, Pasubio with its elevation of 2,239 metres (2,449 yd) remained the only underground war area on the Austro-Italian front.

Unlike the mining efforts on the Western Front, where e.g. the mines on the first day of the Somme (1916) were constructed in a chalk and flint area and where e.g. the mines in the Battle of Messines (1917) were constructed in geology dominated by wet sand and clay, the mine galleries on the Austro-Italian front had to be executed at high altitudes in the hard carbonate rock of the Dolomites using hand-operated drilling machines and chisels. Fighting under these conditions, often in exposed areas near mountain peaks and even in glacial ice, required extreme skill of both Austro-Hungarian and Italian miners.

== List of the mines ==
=== 1916 ===
No.	Date fired	Location	Origin	Explosive charge	Notes
1	1 January 1916	Lagazuoi: Piccolo Lagazuoi (Ital); Kleiner Lagazuoi (Ger)	Austro-Hungarian mine	300 kilograms (660 lb)	1st Austro-Hungarian mine on Lagazuoi. Fired shortly after midnight, the mine causes a large rock above the Italian Cengia Martini stronghold to fall. Slight damage and some demoralizing effect on the Italian soldiers, but no casualties.
2	6 April 1916	Col di Lana	Austro-Hungarian mine	110 kilograms (240 lb)	In early 1916, the Austro-Hungarian army learns through an artillery observer on Pordoi Pass that the fiercely contested Col di Lana summit (the Cima Lana) has been mined by Italian military engineering units. A Tyrolean Kaiserjäger unit on the summit attempts to halt the Italian efforts by firing a hastily prepared small counter mine. The Italian tunnels are damaged only slightly.
3	17 April 1916	Col di Lana	Italian mine	5,020 kilograms (11,070 lb)	This mine consisted of the Galleria S. Andrea tunnel and two chambers beneath the Cima Lana summit on Col di Lana. The mine, which had only been damaged slightly by the Austro-Hungarian attack of 6 April, is fired at 23:35 Italian time. The detonation creates an oblong double crater 35 metres (38 yd) long, 25 metres (27 yd) wide and 12 metres (13 yd) deep. More than 100 men of the 2nd Tyrolean Kaiserjäger regiment are killed and some 170 taken prisoner as the Italian infantry takes the summit.
4	11 July 1916	Castelletto: Punta di Bois (Ital); Schreckenstein (Ger)	Italian mine	35,000 kilograms (77,000 lb)	Placed at the end of a nearly 400 metres (440 yd) -long gallery beneath an Austro-Hungarian stronghold on a plateau off Tofana di Roces. The detonation of the largest mine fired on the Italian front to that date deforms the plateau and the southern part of Castelletto. 13 enemy soldiers die in the explosion, many more in the ensuing battle until Alpini take the site on 14 July.
5	17 September 1916	Monte Cimone di Tonezza	Italian mine	?	Italian troops fire a mine in an unsuccessful attempt to halt an Austro-Hungarian mining attack.
6	23 September 1916	Monte Cimone di Tonezza	Austro-Hungarian mine	14,200 kilograms (31,300 lb)	The mine attacked by the Italians on 17 September is fired and creates a crater 50 metres (55 yd) wide and 22 metres (24 yd) deep on the Monte Cimone summit. The Italians lose 1137 men in the detonation and ensuing battle, of which 500 are taken prisoner.
7	17 November 1916	Zoughi Ridge	Italian mine	?	Austro-Hungarian troops report an explosion, perhaps an accident, in an enemy gallery beneath the Zoughi Ridge. A shallow crater, some 20 metres (22 yd) in diameter, is observed in the steep southern slope but no longer visible today.

=== 1917 ===
No.	Date	Location	Origin	Explosive charge	Notes
8	14 January 1917	Lagazuoi: Piccolo Lagazuoi (Ital); Kleiner Lagazuoi (Ger)	Austro-Hungarian mine	16,000 kilograms (35,000 lb)	2nd Austro-Hungarian mine on Lagazuoi. Fired in no man's land above the Italian Cengia Martini stronghold to cause falling of rocks (see blast of 1 January 1916). The mine creates a crater 37 metres (40 yd) wide and 45 metres (49 yd) deep. Rubble from this detonation can still be seen above the Falzarego Pass.
9	6 March 1917	Monte Sief: Dente del Sief (Ital); Knotz (Ger)	Italian mine	?	1st mine on Monte Sief, a summit adjacent to Col di Lana and linked to it by a ridge. Fired by the Italians as a counter mine, the blast creates a crater 40 metres (44 yd) long and 17 metres (19 yd) deep. The detonation leads to slight damage but no casualties among the defenders, and the mining efforts of the Austro-Hungarian units on the mountain are not disturbed.
10	12 April 1917	Colbricon	Italian mine	800 kilograms (1,800 lb)	1st mine on Colbricon, placed by the Italians in the narrow eastern ridge in an effort to conquer the Western Summit. The detonation collapses a crag and kills 12 Austro-Hungarian soldiers patrolling the area.
11	22 May 1917	Lagazuoi: Piccolo Lagazuoi (Ital); Kleiner Lagazuoi (Ger)	Austro-Hungarian mine	30,400 kilograms (67,000 lb)	3rd Austro-Hungarian mine on Lagazuoi, aimed at the dangerous Italian stronghold on the Trincea Avanzata (Ital) or Strebestein (Ger) crag above Cengia Martini. The blast destroys the stronghold and collapses a rock formation 200 metres (220 yd) tall and up to 140 metres (150 yd) wide, resulting in some 200,000 square metres (240,000 sq yd) of rubble falling into the valley. 4 Italians patrolling the area are killed.
12	8 June 1917	Monte Zebio	Italian mine	?	1st of two mines planned for the start of the Battle of Mount Ortigara, but set off accidentally (likely by lightning during thunderstorm). The detonation creates a crater 35 metres (38 yd) wide and 10 metres (11 yd) deep, killing some 100 Italian and 35 Austro-Hungarian soldiers.
13	10 June 1917	Monte Rotondo	Italian mine	?	2nd of two mines planned for the start of the Battle of Mount Ortigara, this mine is detonated on time and creates a shallow crater 25 metres (27 yd) in diameter. Italian troops fail to break through the front line, however, and the crater is taken by the defenders who incorporate it into the Austro-Hungarian fortification system.
14	20 June 1917	Lagazuoi: Anticima (Ital); Vorkuppe (Ger)	Italian mine	33,000 kilograms (73,000 lb)	After tunneling through the mountain and overcoming a difference in altitude of 190 metres (210 yd), Alpini detonate this mine beneath the vacated enemy stronghold on the crag above Cengia Martini, resulting in a large crater and more rubble falling into the valley. The Austro-Hungarians have no casualties but the Italians lose a few men during the ensuing fighting.
15	16 July 1917	Colbricon	Italian mine	4,000 kilograms (8,800 lb)	2nd mine on Colbricon. The detonation of the charge, placed by the Italians near the site of the first mine, results in the collapse of the eastern ridge near the summit and kills some 25 Austro-Hungarian soldiers.
16	16 September 1917	Lagazuoi: Piccolo Lagazuoi (Ital); Kleiner Lagazuoi (Ger)	Austro-Hungarian mine	5,000 kilograms (11,000 lb)	4th and final Austro-Hungarian mine on Lagazuoi. The detonation moves further masses of rock from above the Cengia Martini into the valley, but does not lead to enemy casualties.
17	19 September 1917	Colbricon	Italian mine		3rd and final mine on Colbricon. The detonation destroys the ridge near the summit further but has no significant impact on the Austro-Hungarian fortifications there.
18	26 September 1917	Marmolada: Forcella V (Ital); Vesurascharte (Ger)	Austro-Hungarian mine	1,250 kilograms (2,760 lb)	1st Austro-Hungarian mine on Marmolada (Ital) or Marmolata (Ger). After losing the height to the Italians, Austro-Hungarian troops detonate a charge beneath the western face of Forcella V (Ital) or Vesurascharte (Ger). Collapsing rock kills some 15 Italian soldiers. Exact site of gallery and chamber not located by 1993.
19	27 September 1917	Monte Sief: Dente del Sief (Ital); Knotz (Ger)	Italian mine	?	2nd mine on Monte Sief, fired by the Italians in yet another attempt to destroy an Austro-Hungarian tunnel system. The detonation only leads to slight damage, but the afterdamp kills 4 Austro-Hungarian tunnellers.
20	29 September 1917	Pasubio: Selletta (Ital); Eselsrücken (Ger) and Dente italiano (Ital); Italienische Platte (Ger)	Austro-Hungarian mine	500 kilograms (1,100 lb)	1st Austro-Hungarian mine on Pasubio. Fired in an attempt to crush an enemy gallery, the mine kills over 30 Italian soldiers.
21	1 October 1917	Pasubio: Selletta (Ital); Eselsrücken (Ger)	Italian mine	16,000 kilograms (35,000 lb)	1st Italian mine on Pasubio. The blast creates a crater 40 metres (44 yd) in diameter and 20 metres (22 yd) deep (still visible today). Afterdamp enters the Austro-Hungarian tunnel system, killing 12 men.
22	10 October 1917	Buso del Oro	Italian mine	?	Fired on Buso del Oro north of Colbricon. Placed at an altitude of 2,187 metres (2,392 yd) in no-man's land near the mountain knoll. When fired in an attempt to crush the enemy gallery, the detonation fails but falling rock kills a miner in the Austro-Hungarian tunnel system.
23	21 October 1917	Monte Sief: Dente del Sief (Ital); Knotz (Ger)	Austro-Hungarian mine	45,000 kilograms (99,000 lb)	3rd mine on Monte Sief, placed beneath the ridge which links Monte Sief with adjacent Col di Lana. The detonation of the largest mine on the Italian front to that date creates a cut, some 80 metres (87 yd) long and 35 metres (38 yd) deep, in the ridge between the Monte Sief summit and the Dente del Sief (Ital) or Knotz (Ger), destroying the two earlier craters created by Italian mines. No significant subterranean damage to the Italian tunnel system but the defending infantry, fighting from trenches and caves, lose 51 men. The cut in the ridge renders the summit of Monte Sief almost impregnable, thereby obstructing the Italian advance in the area.
24	22 October 1917	Pasubio	Italian mine	1,000 kilograms (2,200 lb)	2nd Italian mine on Pasubio. Fired in an attempt to crush an enemy gallery, the mine is not tamped sufficiently and has no significant impact on the Austro-Hungarian fortifications.
25	24 October 1917	Marmolada	Italian mine	450 kilograms (990 lb)	1st Italian mine on Marmolada (Ital) or Marmolata (Ger), placed beneath the glacial ice. The charge causes an Austro-Hungarian fighting tunnel to collapse but no casualties.
26	29 October 1917	Marmolada	Italian mine	1,000 kilograms (2,200 lb)	2nd Italian mine on Marmolada (Ital) or Marmolata (Ger), again placed beneath the glacial ice. No significant impact on the Austro-Hungarian fortifications.
27	3 November 1917	Marmolada	Austro-Hungarian mine	?	2nd Austro-Hungarian and final mine on Marmolada (Ital) or Marmolata (Ger). With the Italians vacating their positions in the Dolomites after the Battle of Caporetto, Austro-Hungarian troops detonate a small charge beneath the glacial ice. Effect on defenders unknown.
28	24 December 1917	Pasubio: Dente italiano (Ital); Italienische Platte (Ger)	Austro-Hungarian mine	6.400 kilograms (14.11 lb)	2nd Austro-Hungarian mine on Pasubio. The detonation on Christmas Eve, beneath the north ledge of the Dente italiano (Ital) or Italienische Platte (Ger), causes part of the rock face to collapse, killing more than 50 Italians.

=== 1918 ===
No.	Date	Location	Origin	Explosive charge	Notes
29	21 January 1918	Pasubio	Italian mine	600 kilograms (1,300 lb)	3rd Italian mine on Pasubio. Built with 2 chambers and fired in an attempt to crush an Austro-Hungarian gallery, the mine has no significant impact on enemy fortifications.
30	2 February 1918	Pasubio: Dente italiano (Ital); Italienische Platte (Ger)	Austro-Hungarian mine	3,800 kilograms (8,400 lb)	3rd Austro-Hungarian mine on Pasubio. Fired in an attempt to crush an enemy gallery, the mine causes severe damage to the Italian tunnel system and kills several soldiers.
31	13 February 1918	Pasubio	Italian mine	?	4th Italian mine on Pasubio. The detonation fails to produce a crater but accidentally sets of a second charge. A further explosion is observed an hour later, its cause remains unknown. Six Austro-Hungarian and two Italian soldiers are killed in the blasts.
32	24 February 1918	Pasubio	Austro-Hungarian mine	?	4th Austro-Hungarian mine on Pasubio. Fired in an attempt to crush an enemy gallery, the mine has no significant impact on the Italian fortifications.
33	5 March 1918	Pasubio	Italian mine	?	5th and final Italian mine on Pasubio. Fired in the effort to halt an Austro-Hungarian mining attack. While the detonation produces some afterdamp in the enemy tunnel system, the blast fails to cause significant damage.
34	13 March 1918	Pasubio: Dente italiano (Ital); Italienische Platte (Ger)	Austro-Hungarian mine	50,000 kilograms (110,000 lb)	Built with two chambers and fired at dawn, shortly before the planned detonation of an Italian mine, the 5th Austro-Hungarian charge on Pasubio produces the largest mine explosion on the Italian Front. The blast destroys the north face of the Dente italiano (Ital) or Italienische Platte (Ger), burying 40 Italian soldiers in the falling rubble. Fire from the detonation also enters the Austro-Hungarian tunnel system, claiming further casualties.

== Gallery ==
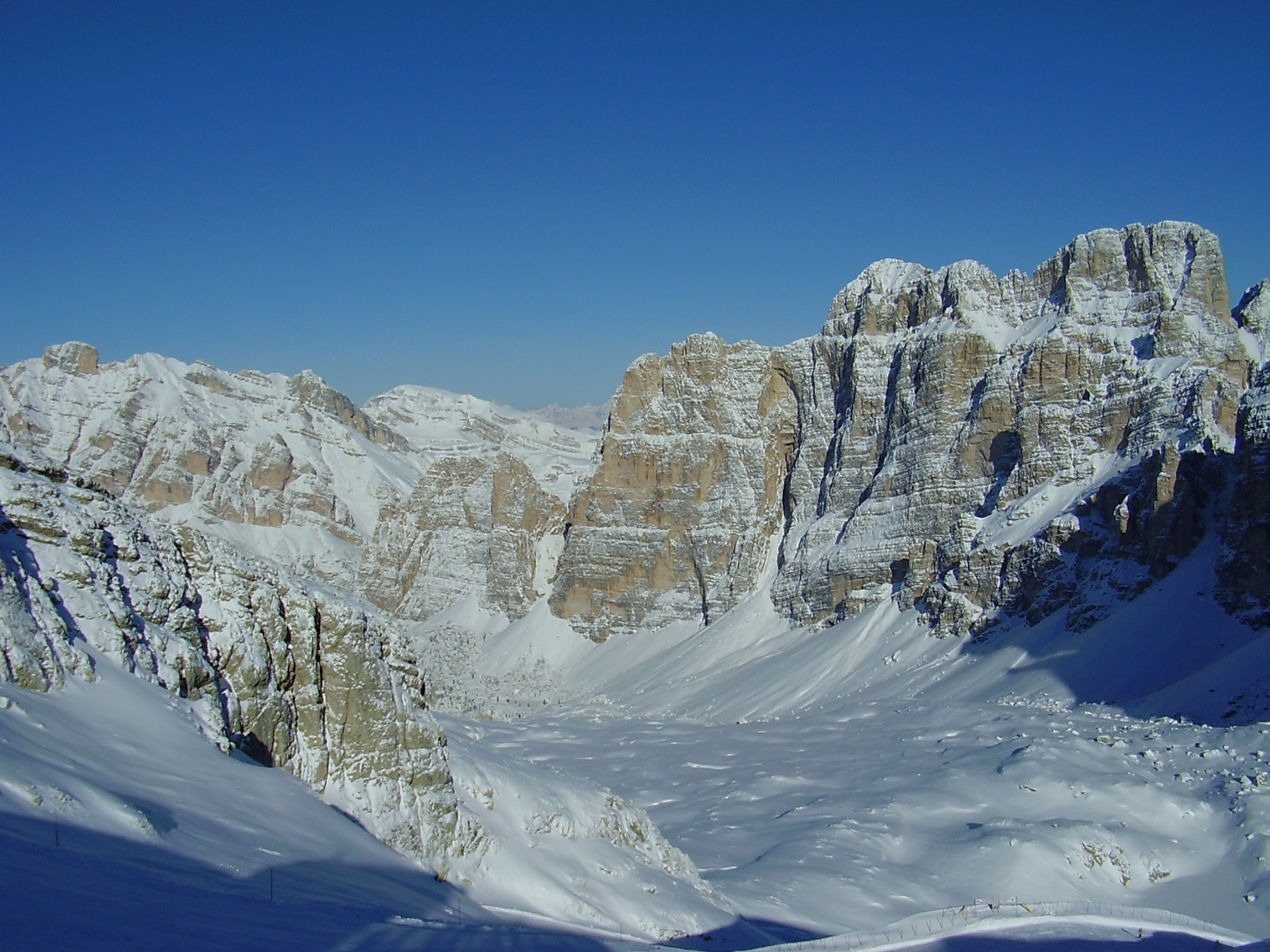
Lagazuoi

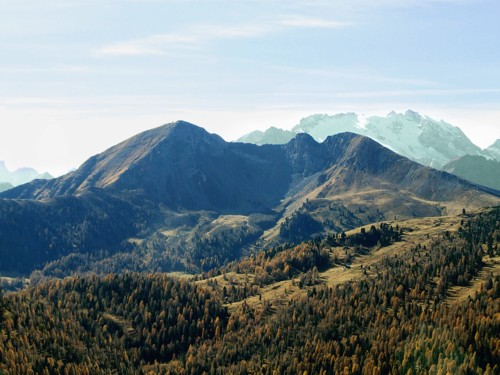
Col di Lana (left) and Monte Sief (right); a large charge was fired beneath the ridge which links the two (see mine #23)

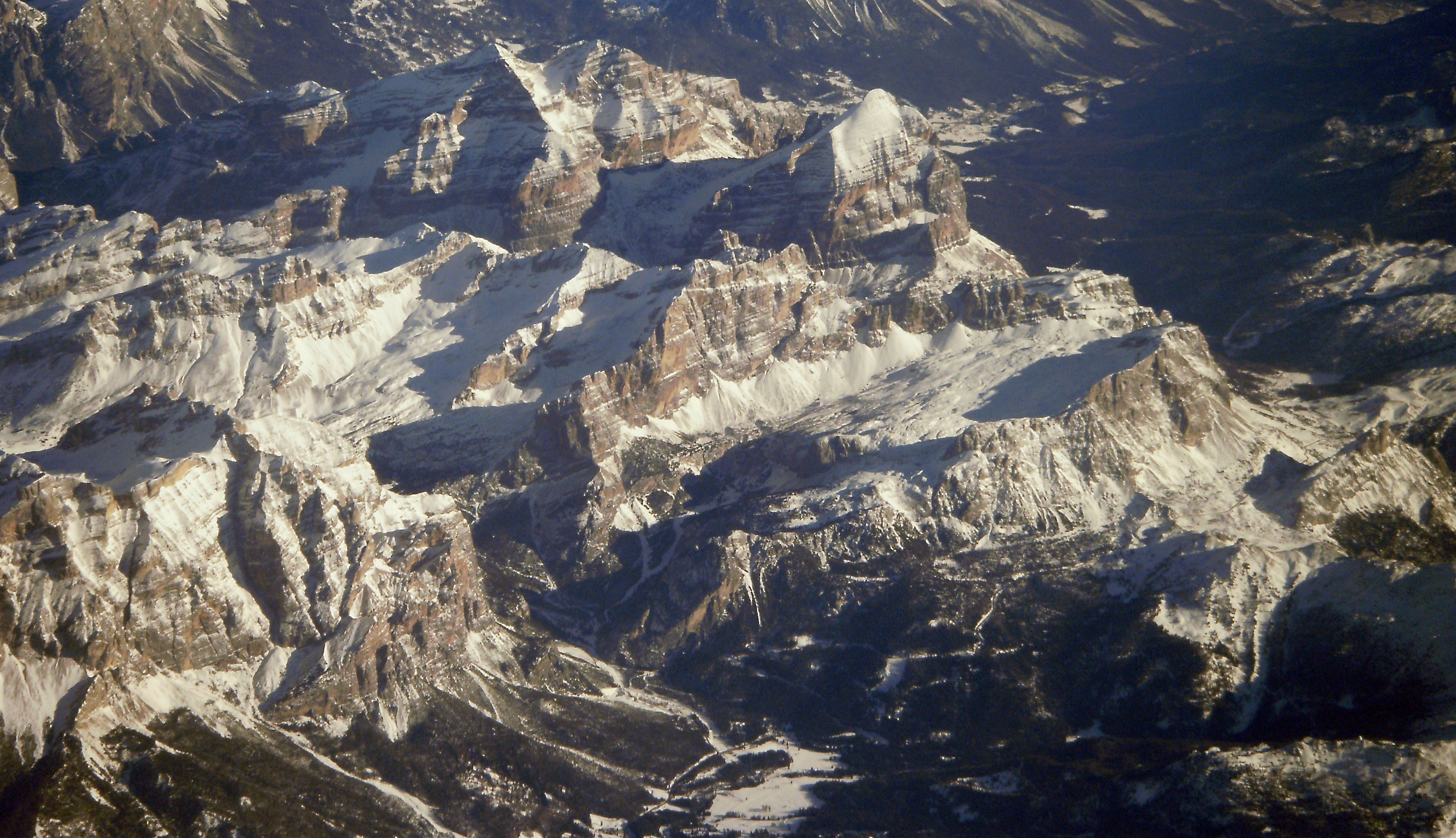
Tofane-Castelletto

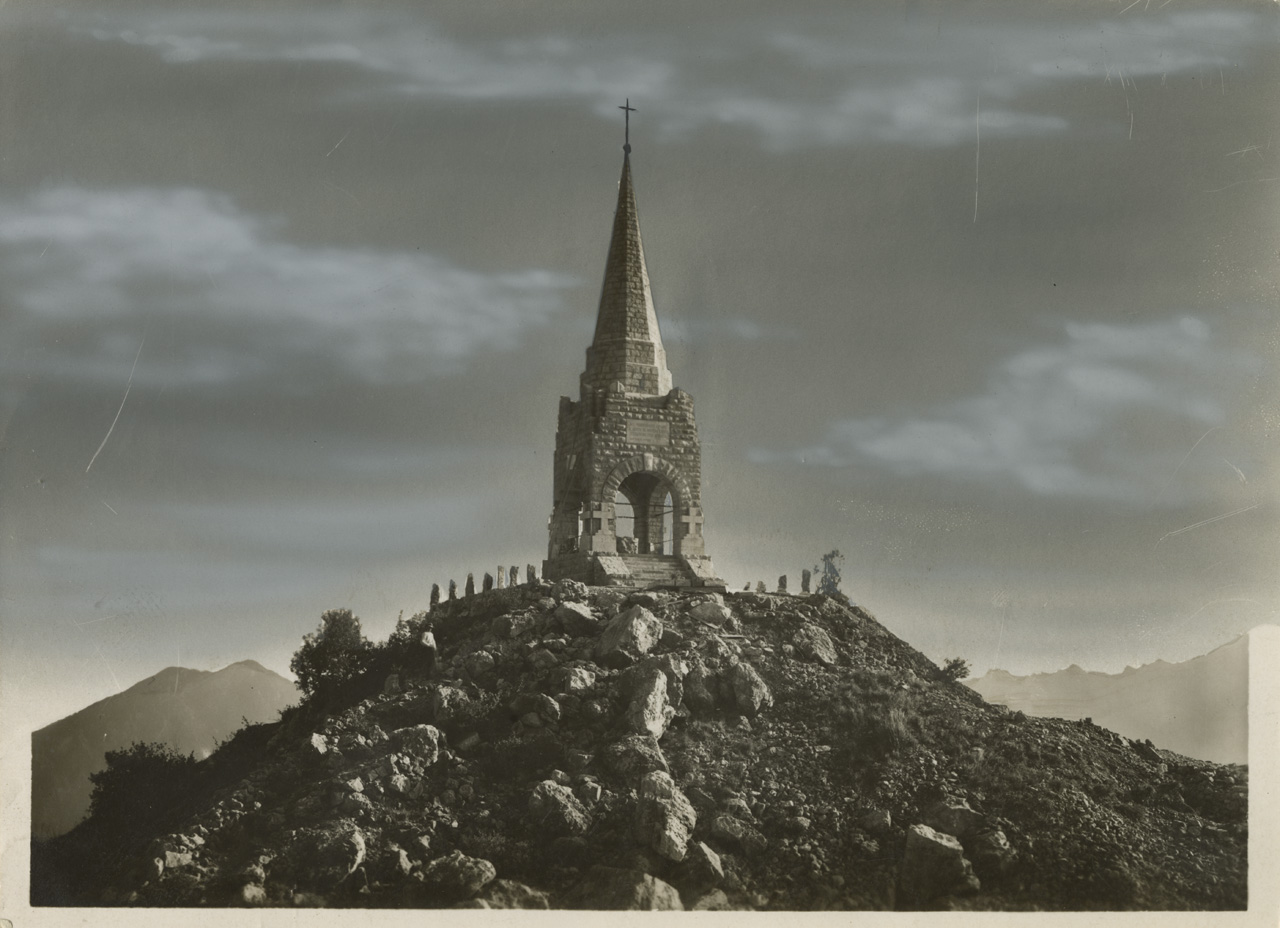
Monte Cimone di Tonezza ossuary

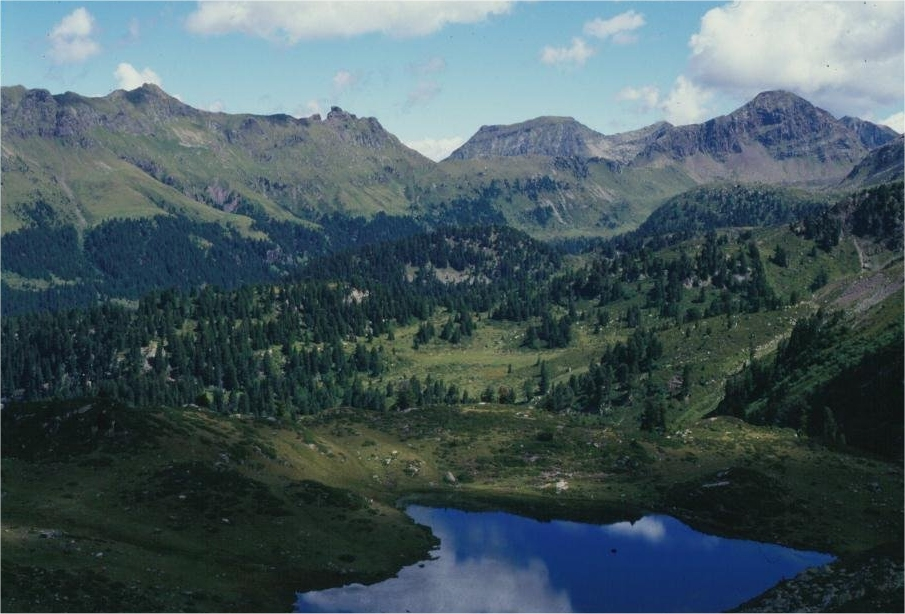
Lagorai-Colbricon

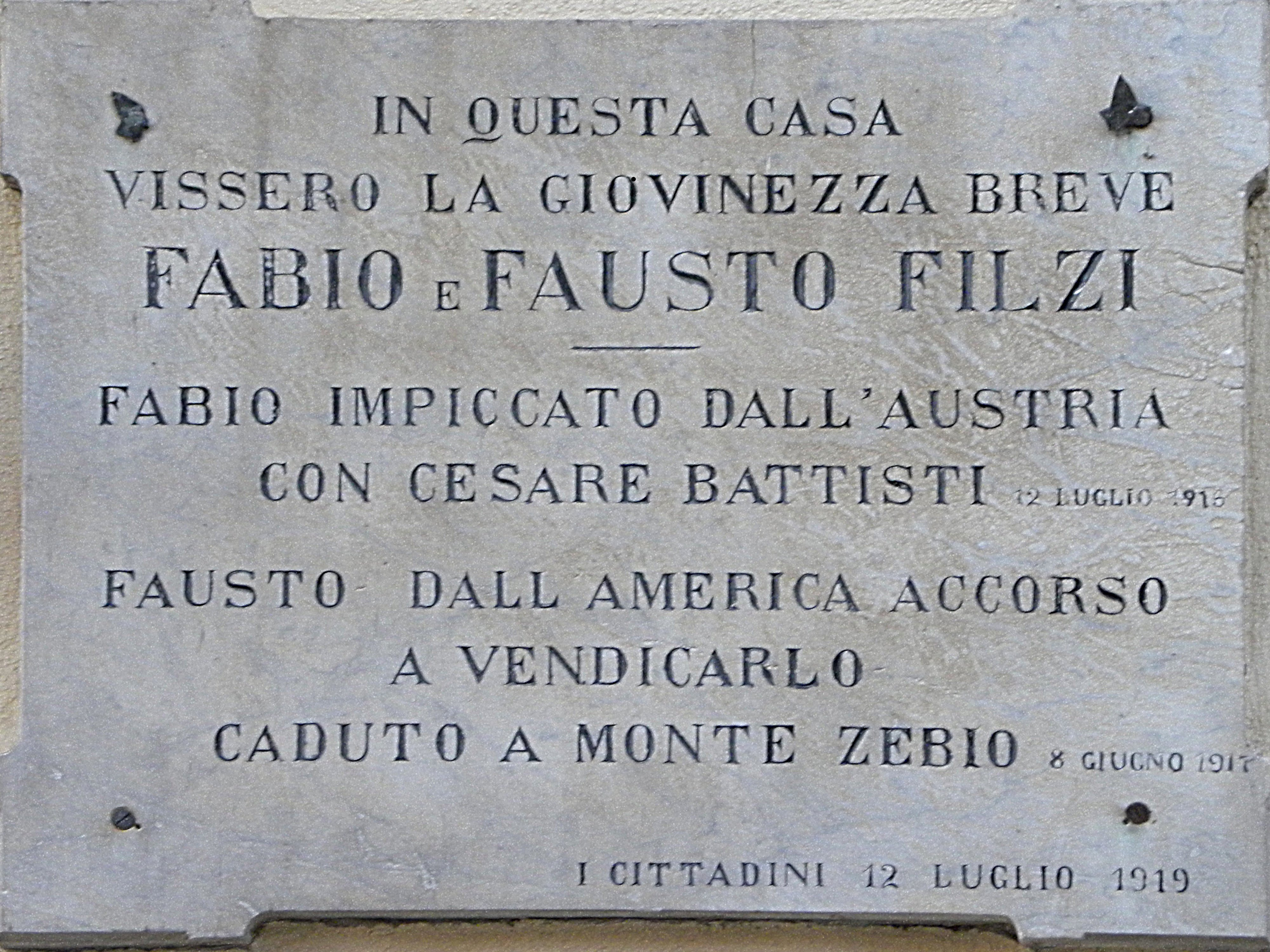
Plaque for Fausto Filzi, killed on Monte Zebio on 8 June 1917 (see mine #12)

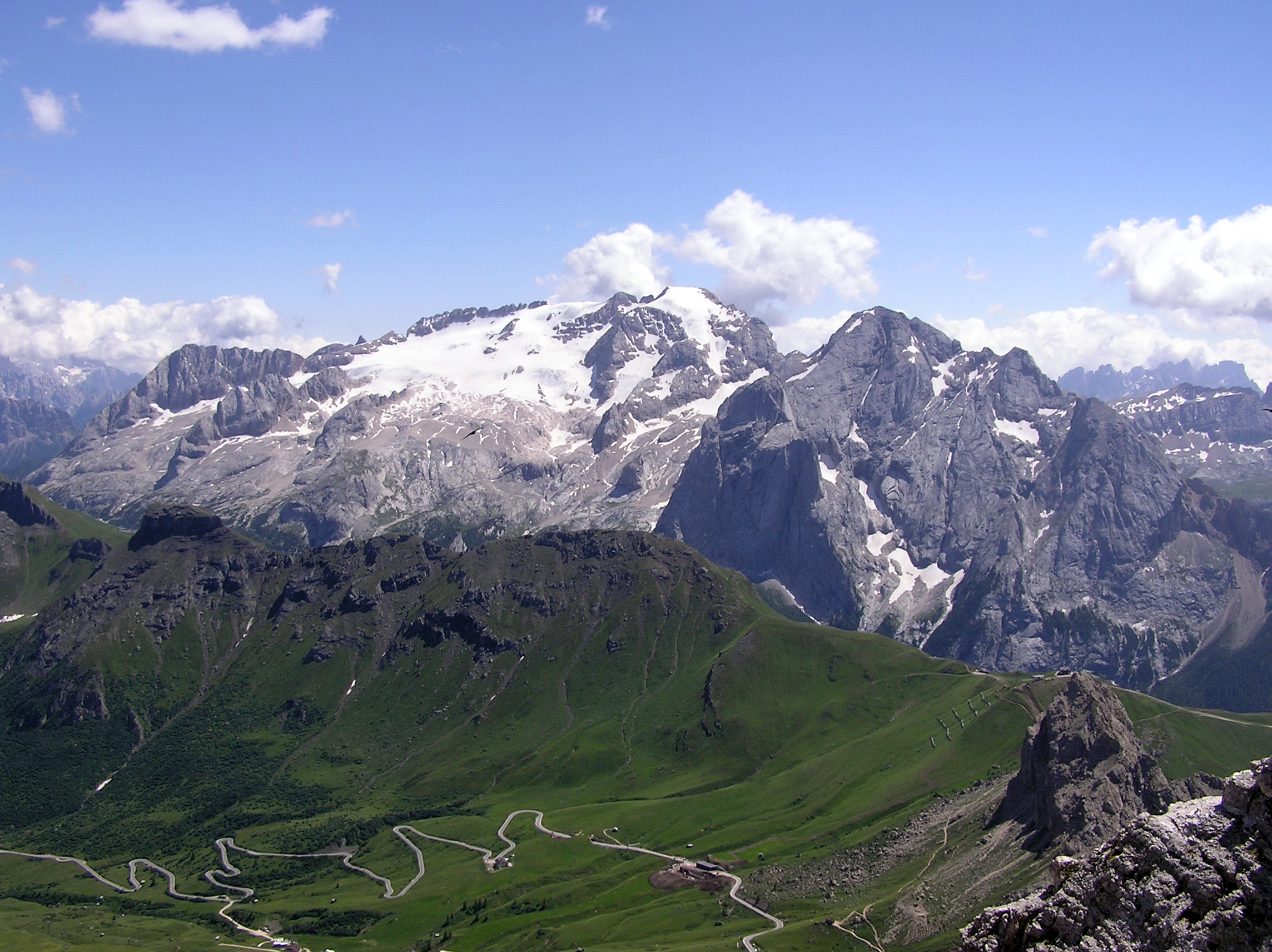
Marmolada

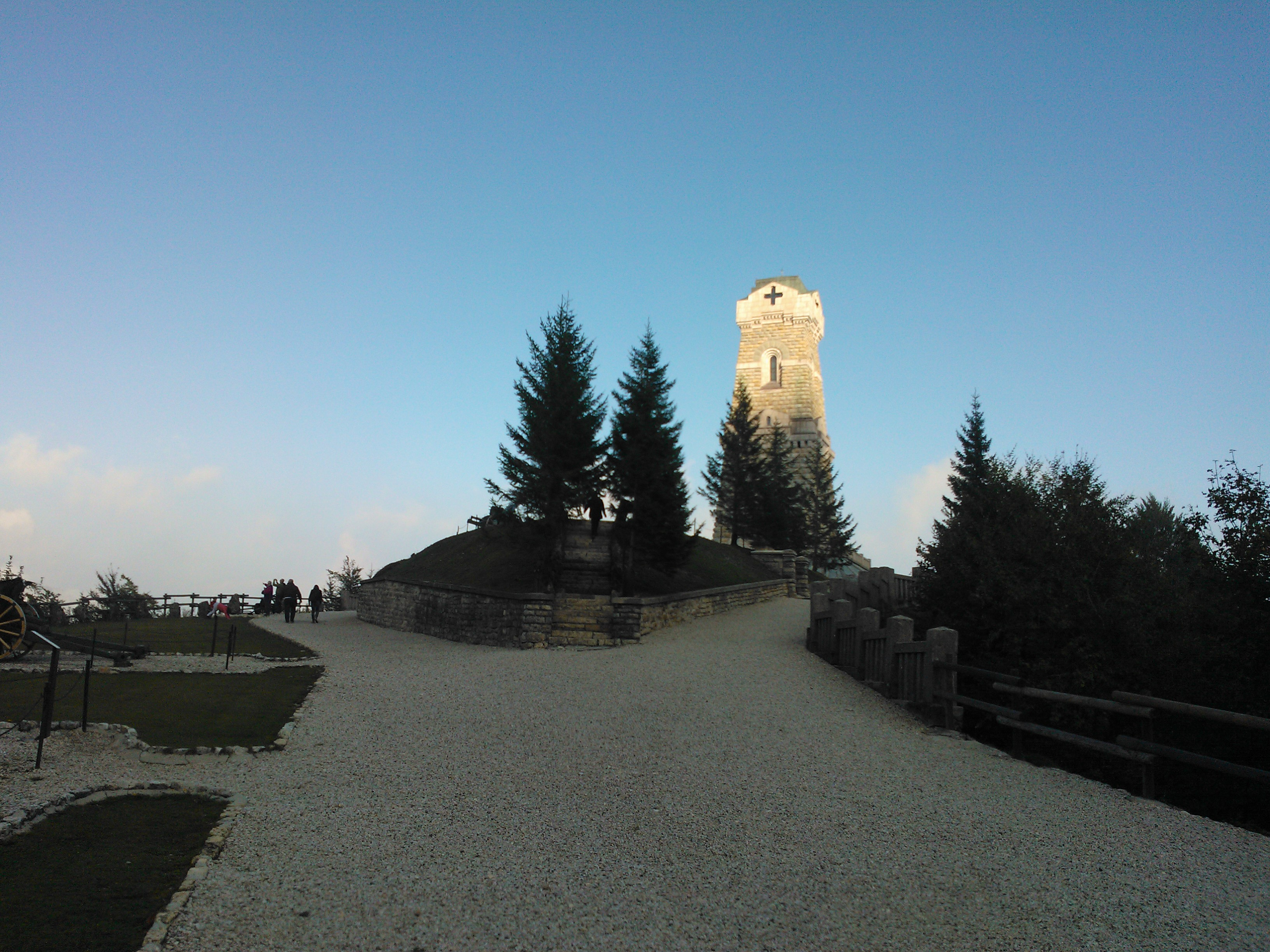
Pasubio, Italian War Memorial

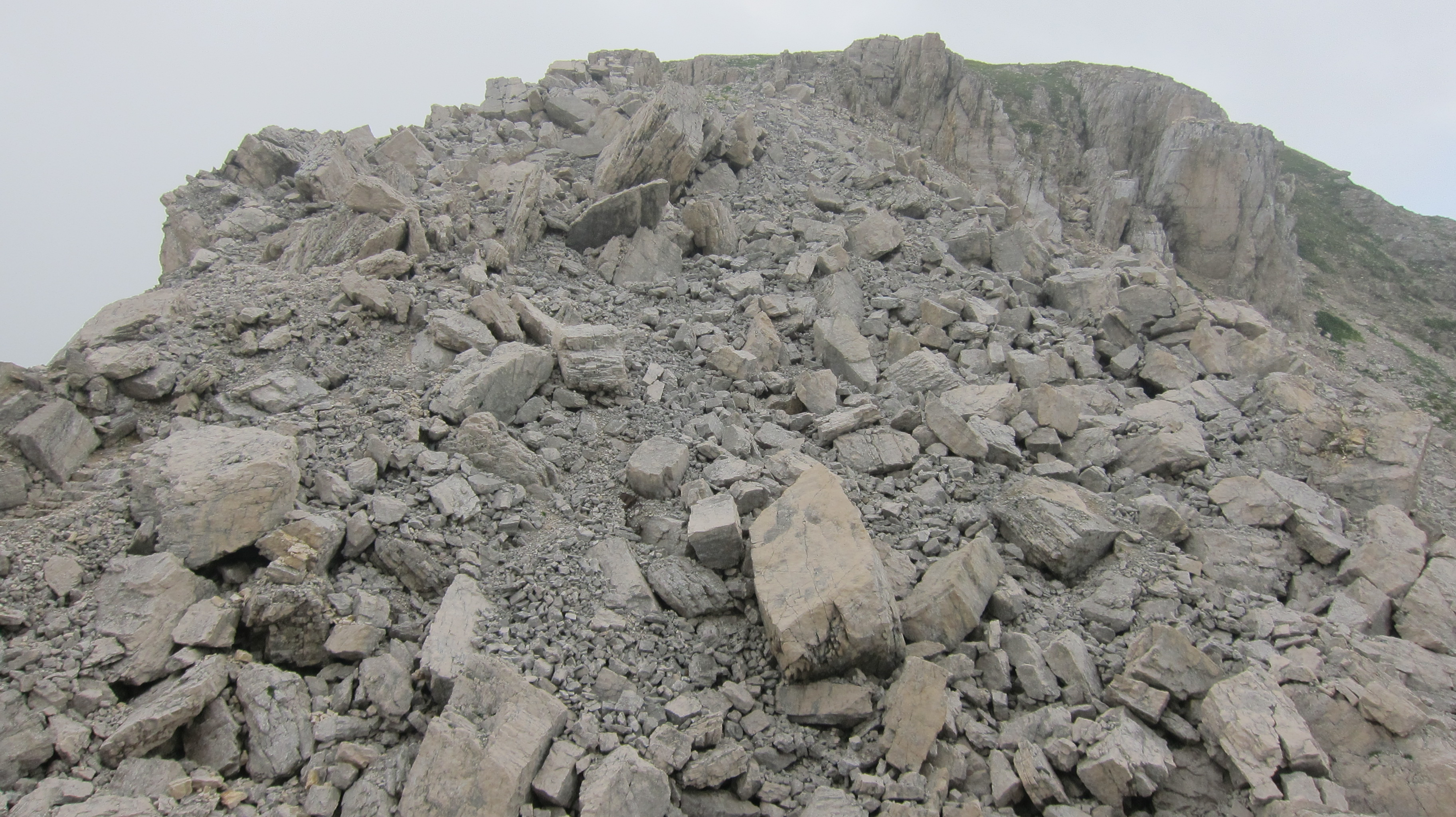
Pasubio, mine rubble on Selletta (Ital) / Eselsrücken (Ger)

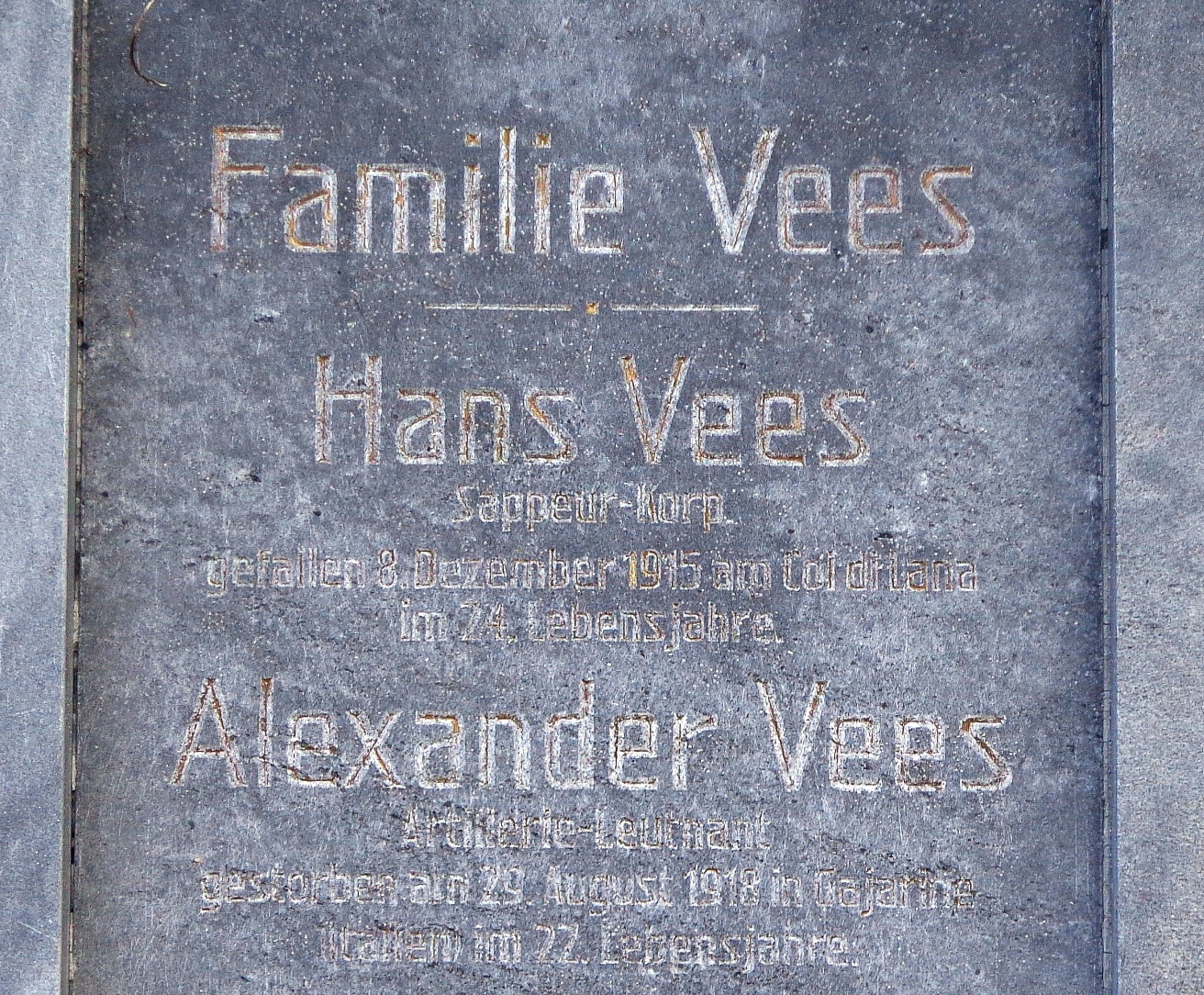
Schärding, family memorial mentioning sapper corporal Hans Vees, killed in action on Col di Lana on 8 December 1915

== Popular culture ==
The Austro-Hungarian and Italian mining efforts in the high mountain peaks of the Italian front were portrayed in fiction in Luis Trenker's film Mountains on Fire of 1931.

== See also ==
- Mines on the first day of the Somme (1916)
- Mines in the Battle of Messines (1917)
- White War

== Books ==
- Striffler, Robert (1993). Der Minenkrieg in den Dolomiten: Lagazuoi, Schreckenstein. Kienesberger. ISBN 978-3-9239-9508-0.
- Striffler, Robert (1988). Der Minenkrieg in Tirol: Colbricon, Buso del Oro, Marmolata. Kienesberger. ISBN 978-3-9239-9507-3.
- Striffler, Robert (1996). Der Minenkrieg in Ladinien: Col di Lana 1915-1916. Kienesberger. ISBN 978-3-9239-9511-0.
- Striffler, Robert (1999). Der Minenkrieg in Ladinien: Monte Sief 1916-1917. Kienesberger. ISBN 978-3-9239-9517-2.
- Striffler, Robert (2001). Der Minenkrieg auf dem Monte Cimone 1916-1918. Kienesberger. ISBN 978-3-9239-9521-9.
