= Monte Cimone di Tonezza =

Mountain in Italy

- Location within Italy

Highest point
- Elevation: 1,226 m (4,022 ft)
- Coordinates: 45°49′22″N 11°20′47″E

Geography
- Location: Veneto, Italy

Monte Cimone di Tonezza is a mountain of the Veneto, Italy. It has an elevation of 1,226 metres (4,022 ft).

== World War I ==
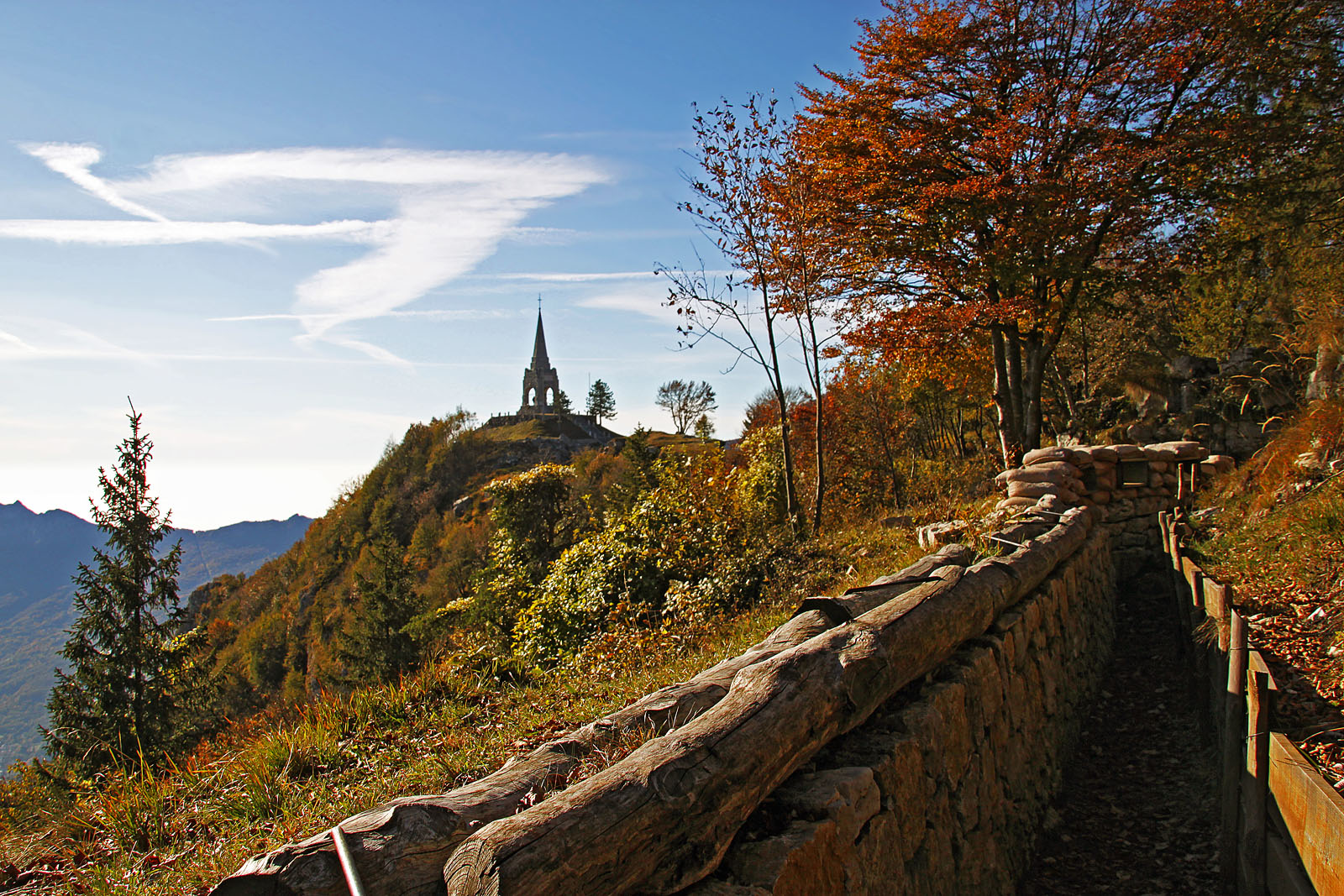
World War I trench and memorial on Monte Cimone di Tonezza

During the First World War, Monte Cimone di Tonezza was the site of tunnel and mine warfare: In order to protect their soldiers from enemy fire and the hostile alpine environment, both Austro-Hungarian and Italian military engineers constructed fighting tunnels which offered a degree of cover and allowed better logistics support. In addition to building underground shelters and covered supply routes for their soldiers, both sides also attempted to break the stalemate of trench warfare by tunneling under no man's land and laying large quantities of explosives beneath the enemy's positions. On 17 September 1916, Italian troops fired a mine on Monte Cimone di Tonezza in an unsuccessful attempt to halt a mining attack by Austro-Hungarian soldiers, but on 23 September 1916 the Austro-Hungarians still fired that mine. The resulting explosion created a crater 50 metres (55 yd) wide and 22 metres (24 yd) deep on the Monte Cimone summit. The Italians lost 1137 men in the detonation and ensuing battle, of which 500 were taken prisoner.
