= Sollefteå Municipality =

Sollefteå Municipality Sollefteå kommun
- Municipality
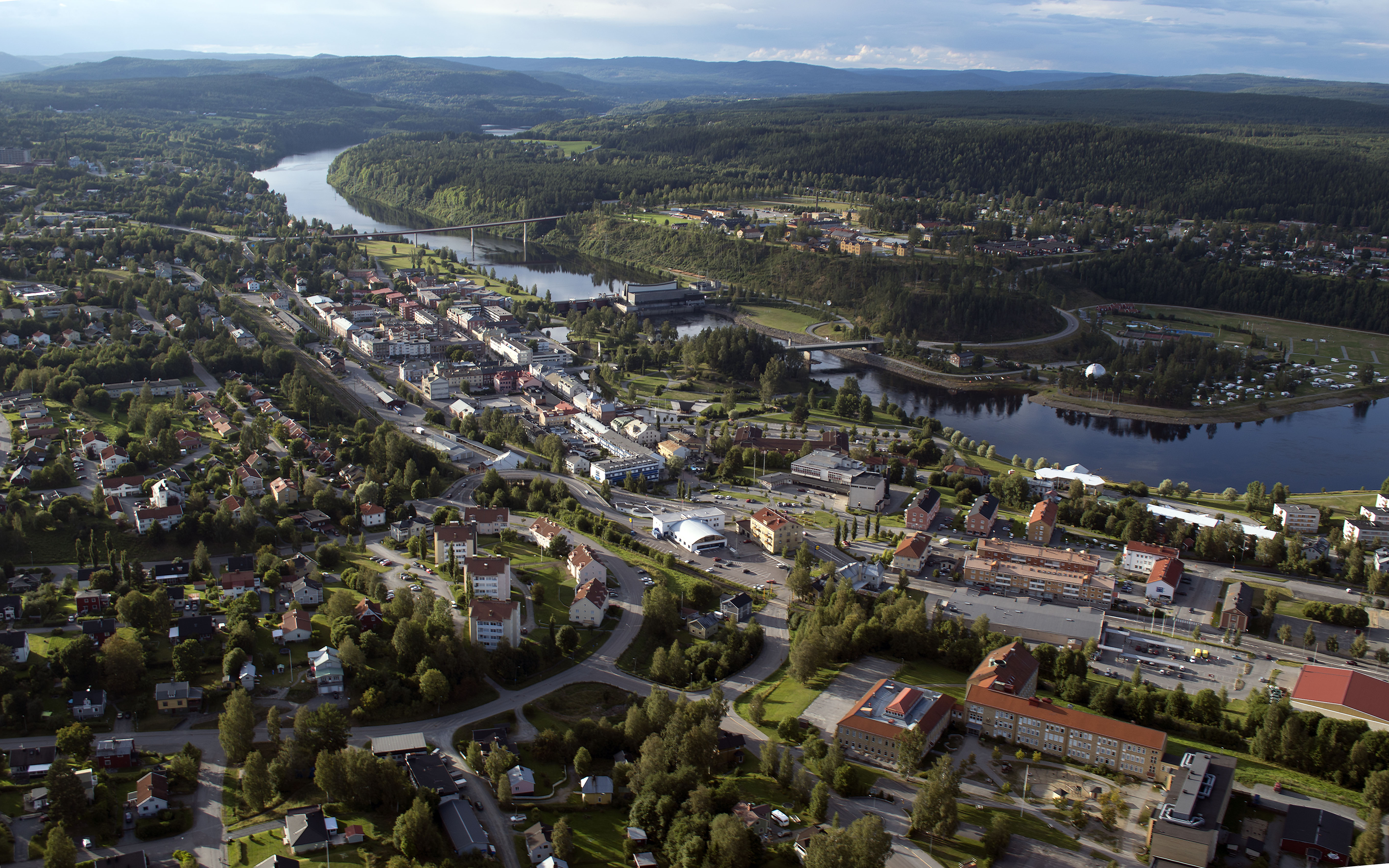

- Coat of arms

- Coordinates: 63°10′N 17°16′E
- Country: Sweden
- County: Västernorrland County
- Seat: Sollefteå

Area
  - Total: 5,761.82 km^{2} (2,224.65 sq mi)
  - Land: 5,397.82 km^{2} (2,084.11 sq mi)
  - Water: 364 km^{2} (141 sq mi)
- Area as of 1 January 2014.

Population (30 June 2025)
  - Total: 18,356
  - Density: 3.4006/km^{2} (8.8076/sq mi)
- Time zone: UTC+1 (CET)
  - Summer (DST): UTC+2 (CEST)
- ISO 3166 code: SE
- Province: Ångermanland
- Municipal code: 2283
- Website: www.solleftea.se

Sollefteå Municipality (Swedish: Sollefteå kommun) is a Swedish municipality in Västernorrland County. Its seat is located in Sollefteå.

The former City of Sollefteå (instituted in 1917) was amalgamated with the surrounding entities in 1974 to form the present municipality. It consists of fifteen original (1863) units.

Historically, the name is found as early as the 13th century in the form of the Latin De Solatum, which would translate to "The Sunny Place" (or so). A market place was situated here in 1602 on Royal permission. The city's coat of arms depicts a Black Grouse.

== Geography ==
Geographically, the landscape is dominated by woods, and by the Ångerman River and its tributaries Faxälven and Fjällsjöälven, which cross through the municipality.

=== Localities ===
- Forsmo
- Junsele
- Långsele
- Näsåker
- Ramsele
- Sollefteå (the seat)
- Österforse

== Demographics ==
This is a demographic table based on Sollefteå Municipality's electoral districts in the 2022 Swedish general election sourced from SVT's election platform, in turn taken from SCB official statistics.

In total there were 18,763 residents, including 14,489 Swedish citizens of voting age. 58.5% voted for the left coalition and 40.0% for the right coalition. Indicators are in percentage points except population totals and income.

Location	Residents	Citizen adults	Left vote	Right vote	Employed	Swedish parents	Foreign heritage	Income SEK	Degree
Location			%	%					
Boteå	789	639	59.6	38.8	76	91	9	21,812	30
Ed	721	547	59.6	38.7	88	94	6	26,385	34
Edsele	432	343	61.6	36.7	83	90	10	20,918	18
Graninge	378	315	64.8	33.0	80	89	11	20,114	26
Helgum	696	552	50.0	49.3	83	90	10	22,754	27
Hullsta	1,634	1,327	63.2	35.2	71	77	23	19,135	30
Junsele	1,233	980	54.2	43.4	77	89	11	19,865	19
Långsele	1,711	1,224	56.0	42.7	76	83	17	20,602	23
Prästbordet	1,205	952	59.9	39.5	87	94	6	27,161	47
Ramsele	1,304	1,030	58.2	39.7	82	92	8	20,890	22
Remsle	1,689	1,304	58.9	40.4	90	93	7	27,479	41
Resele	552	426	51.1	47.6	87	90	10	24,029	35
Skärvsta	1,277	919	59.8	39.8	79	79	21	25,669	37
Trästa	1,663	1,328	59.5	38.6	75	83	17	22,483	30
Ådalsliden	1,022	820	63.7	34.0	81	90	10	20,780	28
Önsta	1,845	1,310	60.1	38.1	70	71	29	21,007	31
Österforse	612	473	52.0	47.7	88	92	8	26,826	30
Source: SVT

== Twin towns – sister cities ==
Sollefteå is twinned with:

- Esashi, Japan
- Madison, United States
- Nykarleby, Finland
- Põltsamaa, Estonia
- Slovenske Konjice, Slovenia
- Steinkjer, Norway
