= Kittelfjäll =

Kittelfjäll Stuore Giemnie
- Village
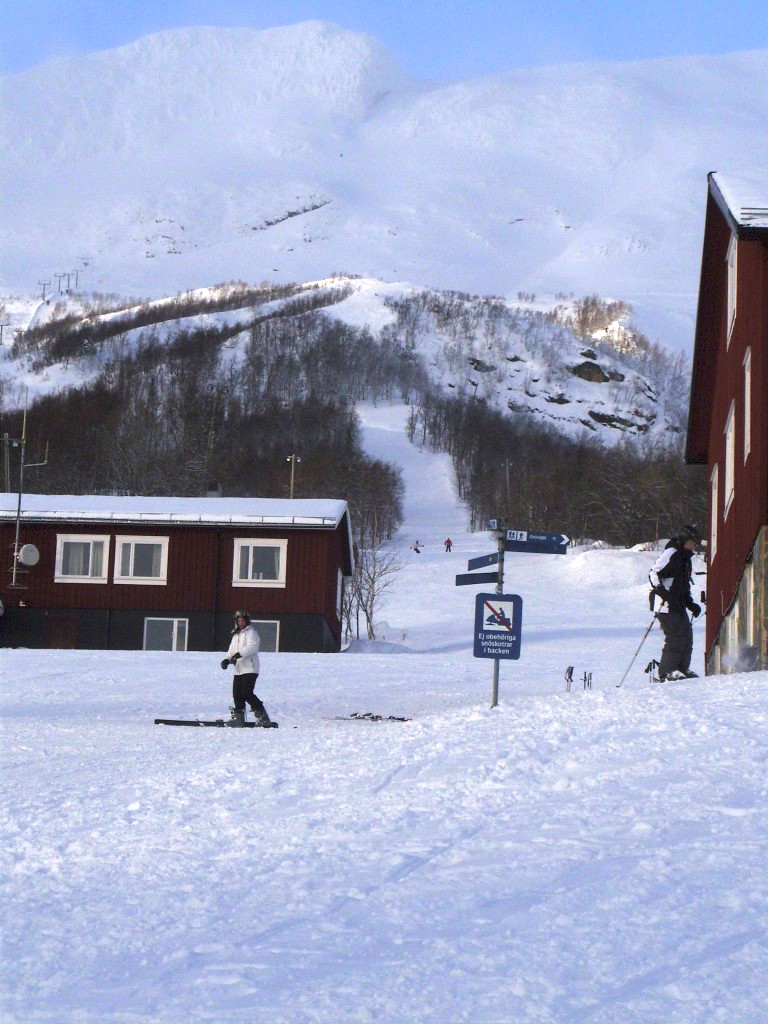
- Kittelfjäll ski resort

- Location within Västerbotten
- Coordinates: 65°15′5″N 15°30′20″E
- Country: Sweden
- County: Västerbotten County
- Municipality: Vilhelmina Municipality
- First settled: 1815
- Founder: Lars Larsson
- Time zone: UTC+1 (CET)
  - Summer (DST): UTC+2 (CEST)

Kittelfjäll (Southern Sami: Stoere Giemnie or Tjiehtele) is a winter sports resort and a former "small locality" in Lapland 90 kilometers northwest of Vilhelmina in Västerbotten County, Sweden. The area is a popular tourist destination, known for its year-round outdoor activities. During the summer, the region attracts visitors with mountain hiking, fishing, and cycling, while the winter offers ski touring, cross-country skiing, snowmobiling, and ice fishing. Accommodations in the area are close to nature with easy access to hiking trails, fishing waters, and ski tracks.

Between 2015 and 2020 Kittelfjäll was classified as a small locality by Statistics Sweden (SCB). Today, the area has a permanent population of fewer than 100 people but sees a growing amount of recreational housing with around 1,400 private properties and about 700 rentable commercial beds.

Kittelfjäll was established by Lars Larsson and his wife Anna Gustafsdotter from Dalarna, who in 1815 received permission to settle in the area.

== Business and tourism ==
=== Ski resort ===
Kittelfjäll is renowned for its extensive skiing opportunities, particularly off-piste skiing. The ski resort is located on the southeastern side of the steep Kittelfjället mountain, whose peak reaches 1225 meters above sea level. The ski area consists of naturally formed ravines and offers 40 runs through sparse birch forests and rolling ridges. In addition to off-piste skiing, there is also a wide range of groomed slopes suitable for both beginners and more advanced skiers. The ski area includes specific zones for children, where they can practice balance and motor skills, as well as a fun park called Central Park, which offers a mix of jumps, rails, and boxes for jibbing.

There are also illuminated cross-country ski trails of 3.5 kilometers, as well as a 5-kilometer trail with the possibility of additional loops. During the spring, the Fjällspåret trail is also prepared on the mountain plateau.

=== Commerce and Restaurants ===
In 2022 Coop Nord took over the grocery store Handlar’n in Kittelfjäll. The takeover included an expansion of the store premises, doubling the space to a total of 334 square meters, of which 220 square meters are dedicated to sales. The investment included 6.4 million SEK in new store fixtures. The store also allows customers to shop even when it is unstaffed.

In addition to the grocery store, there are several businesses that operate restaurants, hotels, and pubs, as well as hostels and cabin rentals. There are also service companies that offer services such as snow removal and cleaning. Many of these businesses collaborate with local partners to offer activities such as snowmobile tours, heliskiing, and other outdoor activities for locals and tourists.

=== Activities and Attractions ===
Kittelfjäll is primarily known for its outdoor activities. In the summer, the area offers opportunities for mountain hiking, fishing, and cycling on scenic routes. The Vojmån River is particularly popular for grayling fishing and catching large trout. In winter, visitors can enjoy ski touring, cross-country skiing, snowmobiling, and ice fishing.

Kittelfjäll offers centrally located accommodations with close proximity to the village's activities, restaurants, and entertainment. There are also accommodation options in Grönfjäll and Henriksfjäll, as well as scenic overnight spots in the upper Vojmådalen. Cultural attractions include the old church in Dikanäs and the local heritage museum. Visitors can also explore the Sámi settlements and the Vojmån trail to learn more about local flora and its uses.

=== Associations ===
Kittelfjäll's Snowmobile Association was founded in 2006 to maintain and develop snowmobile trails in the Kittelfjäll area. The association is responsible for 260 kilometers of trails and is funded through membership fees, trail pass sales, sponsorships, and grants. With two grooming machines and five snowmobiles, they maintain the trails.

The Upper Vojmådalen Community Association works to develop the villages in the area and organizes events for both residents and visitors. During the summer, the association runs a café that serves coffee and waffles, and they also organize flea markets and Midsummer celebrations. Additionally, they rent out the community center and sauna.

== History ==
=== The First Settlers ===
Lars Larsson, also known as "Överste Lasse" (Uppermost Lasse) due to his distance from the rest of the parish, was a man from Dalarna who, along with his wife Anna Gustafsdotter from Brindroset in Äppelbo, applied for permission to establish a crown homestead at Kittelfjället in Vojmådalen. The application was sent to the local authorities (K.B.), and a site inspection was carried out during the summer of 1814. Although the original inspection report has since been lost, later documents reveal that the planned homestead's farmstead and arable land were situated below the southeastern slope of Kittelsskalet, in the valley between the large mountain and the ridge known as Leminjesåje (Southern Sami: Lebnjiesnjuenie).

On 22 August 1815 the K.B. granted this homestead to Lars Larsson, who became the first official settler on the site. To facilitate the establishment of the homestead, a 30-year tax exemption was granted. In 1846, the homestead was officially recognized as a taxed estate named Kittelsfjäll. Before the homestead was officially inspected, Larsson had already settled there and built a cottage with one room and a small barn below Kittelfjällsskalet. His nearest neighbors at that time were in the village of Tresund, but in 1815, he gained a closer neighbor in Dikanäs, approximately 25 kilometers away.

The family lived in good conditions. The area around the farm was rich in lush grass, allowing them to gather enough fodder to raise several cows and a couple of horses. The nearby lakes provided abundant fish, and the mountain slopes were home to many ptarmigans, which could be hunted throughout the winter. Social life on the farm was lively, and visitors were always warmly welcomed.

After Lars Larsson's death in a drowning accident on 31 May 1828, his wife Anna Gustafsdotter took over the homestead rights. She later transferred these rights in writing to her children, Lars Larsson, Gustaf Larsson, and Maria Larsdotter. Gustaf sold his third of the homestead to Nils Jakob Jakobsson from Tresund, who later traded this share to Nils Petter Johansson from Nästansjö. Johansson then sold his share to Johan Gustaf Persson Vesterlund from Dikanäs. Vesterlund, who was a widower when he moved to Kittelfjäll, later married Maria Larsdotter and thus acquired the second third of Kittelfjäll. Vesterlund subsequently sold this portion to Jon Hansson from Rönnäs. By 1851, the estate in Kittelfjäll was owned by three farmers.

== Geography ==
=== Kittelfjället ===
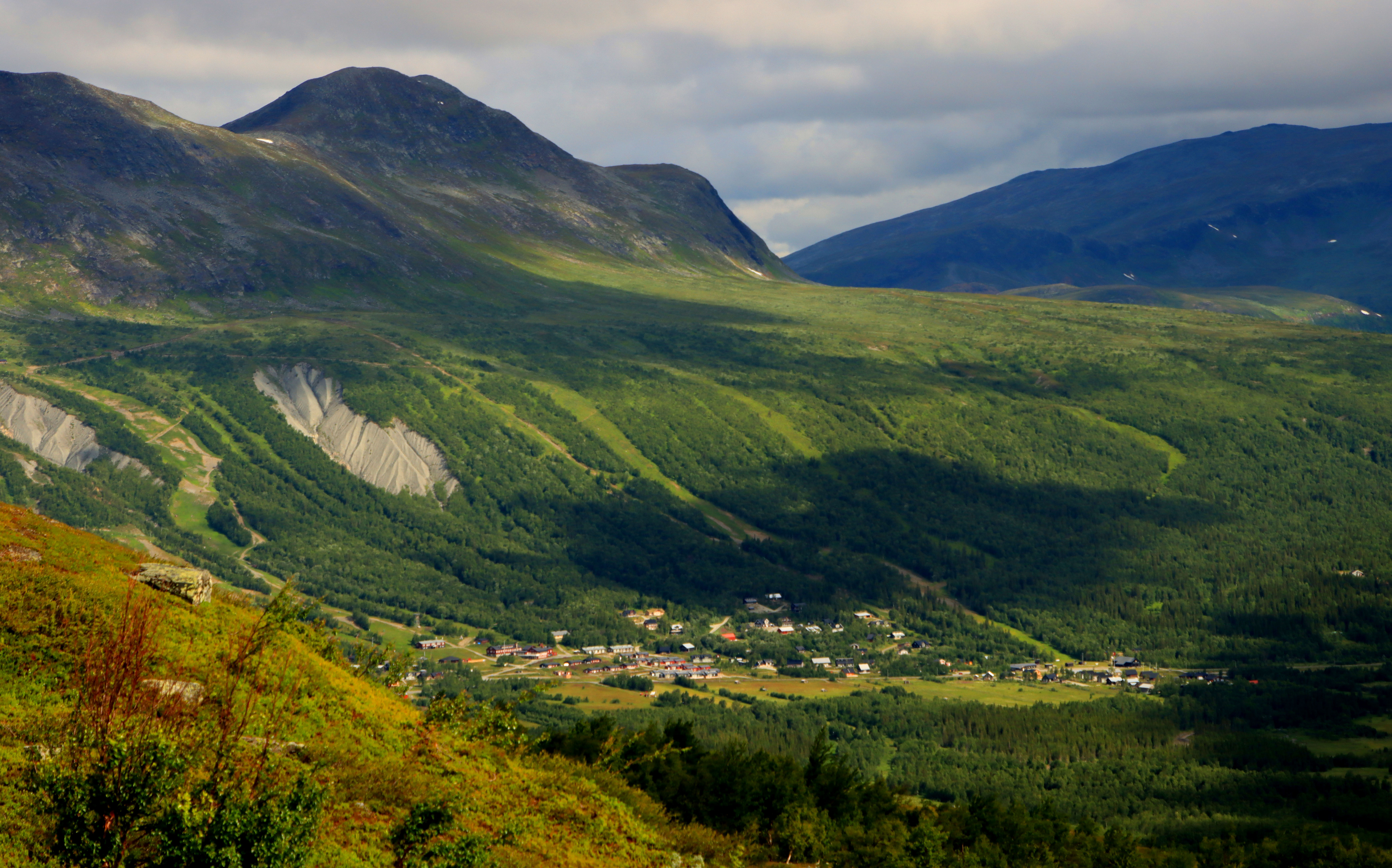
Overview image of Kittelfjäll and its ski slopes (2020)

Kittelfjället and Fågelfjället are located in a valley that offers a striking wilderness experience. The area is a popular destination, particularly during the late winter, attracting snowmobilers. Snowkiting is popular on the Kittelsjöarna lakes, while the southern slopes of Fågelfjället are well-frequented for skiing and sledding.

Kittelfjället is famous for its magnificent views of the mountain massif and is popular for off-piste skiing. During the winter, ski lifts provide access to several runs and a summit lodge. The steep slopes of the mountain also attract climbers and paragliders. There are groomed cross-country ski trails and, in the summer, two paths that pass through the ravines. Hiking along the mountain ridge leads to the southern and northern peaks, at 1,217 meters and 1,231 meters above sea level, respectively, offering views over Vojmådalen, Girifjället, and Marsfjället.

Another hiking option is to follow the Kittelfjäll ridge westward toward Lebnjiesnjuenie. A summer challenge is the Via Ferrata climbing route, located outside the nature reserve and requiring climbing equipment. The trail between Kittelfjäll and Grönfjäll is an easy hiking, skiing, and snowmobiling route through forests with beautiful views. Mountain biking is also popular along this stretch. Skiers can take the lift up Kittelfjället and follow the mountain side eastward to the snowmobile trail, which continues toward Henriksfjäll. The trail passes through ancient spruce forests with a mystical atmosphere.

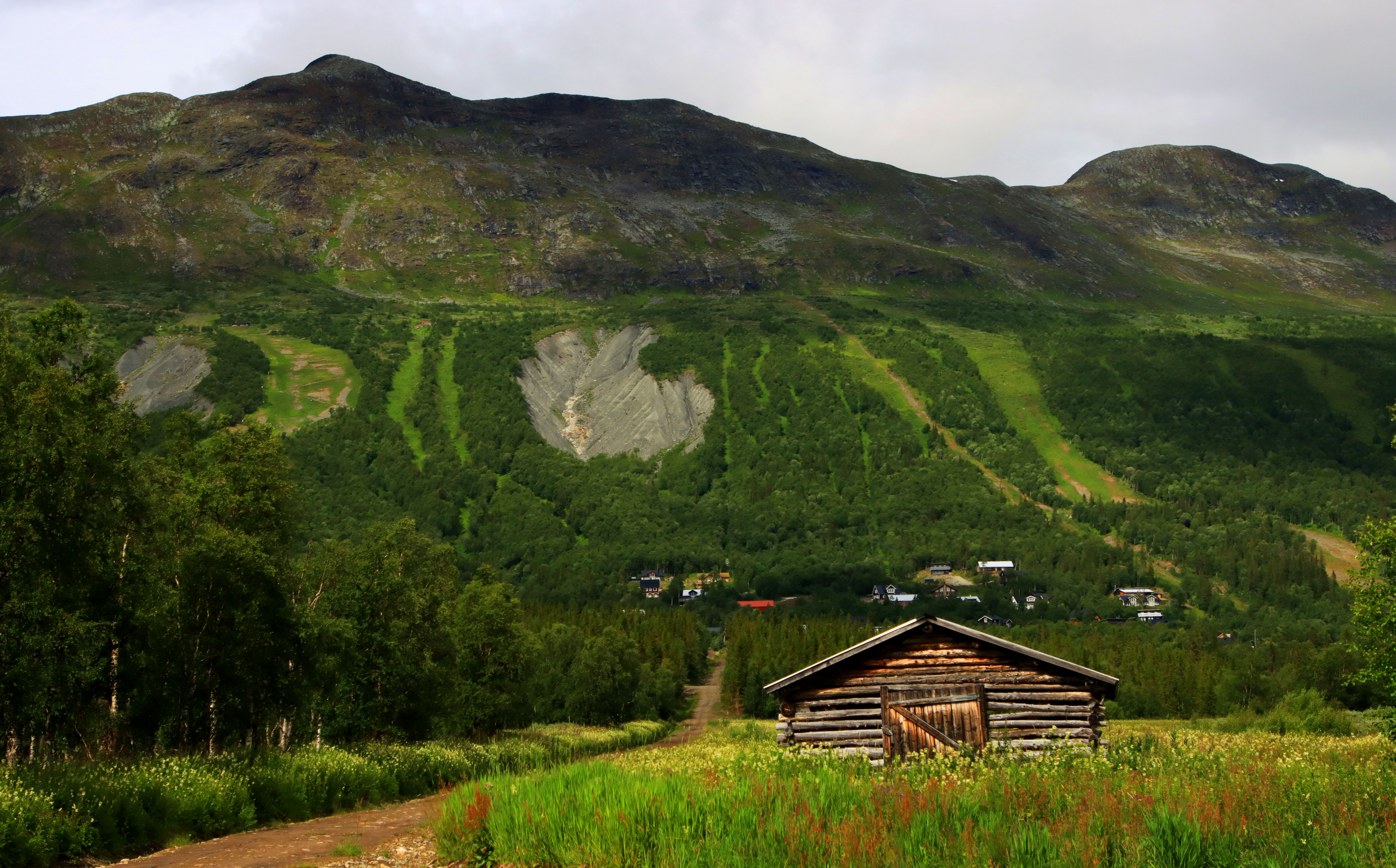
Image of Kittelfjäll with the ski resort in the background. (2020)

Kittelfjället's steep slopes feature several deep ravines in the thick moraine layer, many of which are active with landslides and mudflows. The largest ravine was formed by a major landslide in 1909. Smaller parts of these ravines lie within the Södra Gardfjället Nature Reserve. In winter, the ravines are popular descents from Kittelfjället's lift system. On the higher mountain plateaus, the ice sheet has left no moraine material, instead only removing weathering products from the surface.

The area is renowned for its powder snow skiing on dry, light snow. Within the nature reserve, precipitation and snow cover thickness vary greatly, depending on the topography and weather conditions such as wind speed and direction. Kittelfjället and Grönfjället are also known for their unique flora, where lime-loving species like the mountain avens, green spleenwort, hair sedge, alpine chickweed, and net-leaved willow thrive. Despite the lime-rich environment, lime-avoiding species like the parsley fern also exist in these areas.

=== Vojmån ===
Vojmån is an unregulated headwater stream of the Ångerman River in Sweden. It flows through a valley between Kittelfjället and Borkafjället, known for being one of the country's most prominent breakthrough valleys. Borkafjället's peak reaches 1,310 meters above sea level, rising about 800 meters above the surface of Lake Borka. The area is characterized by dramatic landscapes with talus slopes at the mountain's cliffs. The river flows through Lake Borka and continues eastward past Kittelfjäll, where large and deep ravines have formed in a layer of fine-grained moraine.

The surroundings of Vojmån are rich in lush herbaceous vegetation, including species like the northern monkshood and yellow mountain saxifrage. South of the river, near the village of Kittelfjäll, there are hills with the mineral serpentine, which gives rise to a unique flora with sparse and low serpentine pine forests. The area around Kittelfjäll also features significant agricultural landscapes of cultural and historical value.

== Climate ==
Kittelfjäll experiences a subarctic climate characterized by long, cold winters and short, cool summers. The lowest recorded temperature in Kittelfjäll (at the Gielas A Station between 2014 and 2024) was −41.7 °C in January 2024, while the highest was 28.7 °C in July 2018.

A precipitation record for the year within Vilhelmina Municipality was set on 2 August 2023, in Kittelfjäll, where 44 millimeters of rain were measured in a single day. However, this is not the highest amount of precipitation ever recorded in the area. On 24 July 2009, 66.2 millimeters of rain were recorded, which remains the standing record for the location.

The area is well-known for its powder snow skiing on dry, light snow. Within the nature reserve, precipitation and snow cover thickness vary significantly, influenced by the area's topography and weather conditions such as wind speed and direction. Strong winds exceeding 20 m/s are common, with winds of 47 m/s recorded in Kittelfjäll in 2017.

Climate data for Dikanäs 1991–2020 normals (484m)
Month	Jan	Feb	Mar	Apr	May	Jun	Jul	Aug	Sep	Oct	Nov	Dec	Year
Mean daily maximum °C (°F)	−5.9 (21.4)	−5.3 (22.5)	−0.7 (30.7)	4.3 (39.7)	10.0 (50.0)	15.6 (60.1)	18.5 (65.3)	16.5 (61.7)	11.1 (52.0)	3.6 (38.5)	−2.0 (28.4)	−4.6 (23.7)	5.1 (41.2)
Daily mean °C (°F)	−9.6 (14.7)	−9.5 (14.9)	−5.8 (21.6)	−0.5 (31.1)	5.0 (41.0)	10.1 (50.2)	13.1 (55.6)	11.2 (52.2)	6.6 (43.9)	0.4 (32.7)	−5.0 (23.0)	−7.9 (17.8)	0.7 (33.2)
Mean daily minimum °C (°F)	−14.1 (6.6)	−14.1 (6.6)	−10.7 (12.7)	−5.4 (22.3)	−0.3 (31.5)	4.8 (40.6)	7.9 (46.2)	6.4 (43.5)	2.7 (36.9)	−2.5 (27.5)	−8.2 (17.2)	−12.0 (10.4)	−3.8 (25.2)
Average precipitation mm (inches)	54.8 (2.16)	39.8 (1.57)	37.4 (1.47)	33.9 (1.33)	46.6 (1.83)	70.9 (2.79)	105.3 (4.15)	86.4 (3.40)	65.2 (2.57)	58.0 (2.28)	55.2 (2.17)	52.8 (2.08)	706.3 (27.8)
Source: NOAA

Climate data for Gielas A 1991–2020 normals (578m)
Month	Jan	Feb	Mar	Apr	May	Jun	Jul	Aug	Sep	Oct	Nov	Dec	Year
Mean daily maximum °C (°F)	−6.0 (21.2)	−5.4 (22.3)	−1.4 (29.5)	3.4 (38.1)	8.8 (47.8)	14.3 (57.7)	17.3 (63.1)	15.5 (59.9)	10.6 (51.1)	3.5 (38.3)	−2.0 (28.4)	−4.6 (23.7)	4.5 (40.1)
Daily mean °C (°F)	−10.4 (13.3)	−10.3 (13.5)	−6.7 (19.9)	−1.3 (29.7)	4.0 (39.2)	9.0 (48.2)	11.9 (53.4)	10.3 (50.5)	6.1 (43.0)	0.3 (32.5)	−5.5 (22.1)	−8.7 (16.3)	−0.1 (31.8)
Mean daily minimum °C (°F)	−16.2 (2.8)	−16.2 (2.8)	−13.0 (8.6)	−7.0 (19.4)	−1.2 (29.8)	3.3 (37.9)	5.0 (41.0)	6.8 (44.2)	1.7 (35.1)	−3.2 (26.2)	−9.8 (14.4)	−13.7 (7.3)	−5.3 (22.5)
Average precipitation mm (inches)	47.7 (1.88)	42.0 (1.65)	38.2 (1.50)	27.3 (1.07)	30.8 (1.21)	51.5 (2.03)	76.1 (3.00)	64.7 (2.55)	49.3 (1.94)	42.3 (1.67)	41.4 (1.63)	46.5 (1.83)	557.8 (21.96)
Source: NOAA

== People Associated with the Area ==
- Bengt Erik Grahn (1941–2019) was a Swedish alpine skier, known for winning six individual Swedish National Championship gold medals and being Sweden's top slalom skier during the 1960s.
