= Ramsele =

- Location within Västernorrland Location within Sweden
- Coordinates: 63°32′N 16°28′E
- Country: Sweden
- Province: Ångermanland
- County: Västernorrland County
- Municipality: Sollefteå Municipality

Area
  - Total: 1.97 km^{2} (0.76 sq mi)

Population (31 December 2010)
  - Total: 968
  - Density: 492/km^{2} (1,270/sq mi)
- Time zone: UTC+1 (CET)
  - Summer (DST): UTC+2 (CEST)

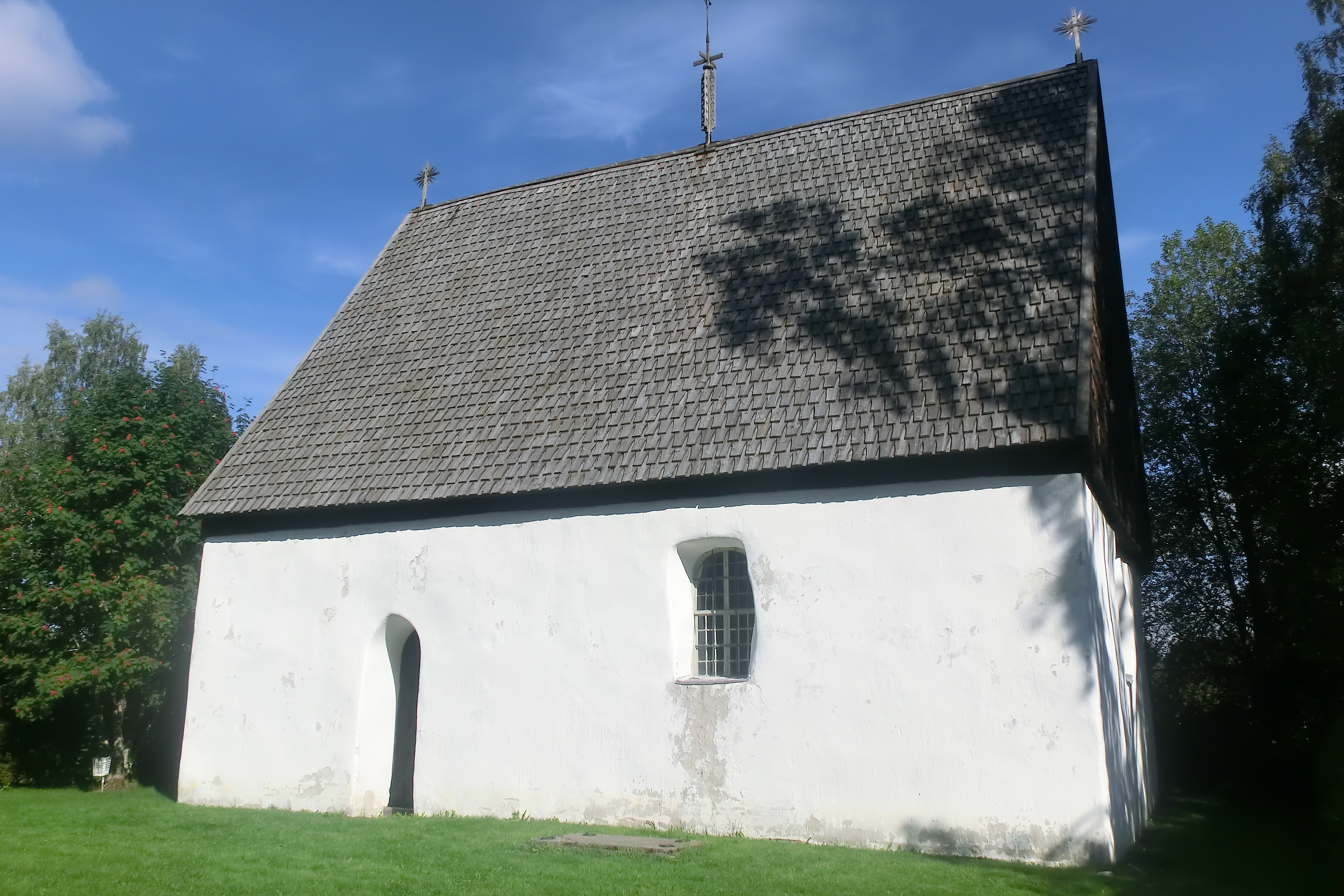
Ramsele old church

Ramsele (Swedish pronunciation: [ˈrǎmːsɛlɛ]) is a locality situated in Sollefteå Municipality, Västernorrland County, Sweden with 968 inhabitants in 2010. Since the 1960s, the population has decreased from 1563 to 968. It is situated by the river Faxälven about 70 km north-west of Sollefteå. The oldest known name of the town is "Rannasild", according to a local book about the area. Later it was known as Hrafnasil, a name which probably originated from Old Norse, and literally meant 'Calm water of ravens'. The oldest evidence of settlement is a church from the late 13th century.
