= Fjällsjöälven =

River in Sweden

Coordinates: 63°29′03″N 16°49′44″E

Fjällsjöälven is a river in northwestern Ångermanland, Strömsund municipality. It is a tributary of the Ångerman River. Length is about 80 km, and source flows are about 260 km.

The Fjällsjöälven has its headwaters in the border region between Lapland and Jämtland with a northern source, the Saxån, and a southern source, the Sjoutälven, which unite in the four-mile-long Tåsjön (248 m above sea level). Below Tåsjön, Fjällsjöälven also receives water from Flåsjöån, Rörströmsälven and Hotingsån, when they merge in Bodumsjön (212 m above sea level) at Rossön (Bodums parish) in Strömsund municipality.

In the lower reaches of the river there are Kilforsen (24 m) and Åkvissleforsen (30 m).

Fjällsjöälven flows into Ångermanälven about 5 km northwest of Näsåker.

The largest tributary of the Fjällsjöälven is the Vängelälven, which transfers water from the Faxälven.

== Tributaries ==
Tributaries below listed from the mouth of the sea to the sources. The source flows of each river are indicated by (*):

  - Vängelälven
    - Grytån
    - Regesjöån
      - Mörtsjöbäcken
    - Äxingsån
    - Malmån
  - Gransjöån
  - Stampån
  - Jansjöån
    - Grössjöån*
  - Kråkån
  - Nagasjöån
    - Hällvattenån*
  - Gessjöån
  - Hotingsån*
    - Flåsjöån*
      - Fånån*
      - Fallån*
      - Kvarnån*
        - Dammån*
      - Järilån*
    - Tåsjöälven*
      - Sjoutälven*
        - Guoutelejukke*
        - Trångmoån*
          - Gierkejukke
      - Saxälven*
        - Lillån
        - Dajmaån
        - Sannarån*
  - Röströmsälven*
    - Bäån
    - Staversån
    - Rensjöån
    - Djupån
    - Ormsjöån*
      - Långselån*
        - Gittsån
        - Stensjöbäcken
        - Korpån*
      - Bergvattenån*
        - Sallsjöån*
        - Fjällån*
