= Junsele IF =

Swedish football club

- Full name: Junsele Idrottsförening
- Nickname: JIF
- Founded: 1908
- Ground: Mons IP; Junsele; Sweden
- Chairman: Stig Malmqvist; Sven Ulander (Football)
- League: Division 2 Norrland
- 2010: Division 3 Mellersta Norrland, 1st (Promoted)
Home colours

Junsele IF is a Swedish football club located in Junsele in Sollefteå Municipality, Västernorrland County.

== Background ==
Junsele Idrottsförening is a sports club from Junsele that was founded in 1908. The club specialises in the sports of football, cross country skiing, alpine skiing, tennis, fitness and ice hockey.

Since their foundation Junsele IF has participated mainly in the middle and lower divisions of the Swedish football league system. In the 2010 season the club finished top of Division 3 Mellersta Norrland, which is the fifth tier of Swedish football, and have won promotion to Division 2 for the first time. They play their home matches at the Mons IP in Junsele.

Junsele IF are affiliated to the Ångermanlands Fotbollförbund.

== Season to season ==
Season	Level	Division	Section	Position	Movements
1999	Tier 5	Division 4	Ångermanland	10th	
2000	Tier 5	Division 4	Ångermanland	6th	
2001	Tier 5	Division 4	Ångermanland	9th	
2002	Tier 5	Division 4	Ångermanland	12th	Relegated
2003	Tier 6	Division 5	Ångermanland	2nd	Promoted
2004	Tier 5	Division 4	Ångermanland	6th	
2005	Tier 5	Division 4	Ångermanland	1st	Promoted
2006*	Tier 5	Division 3	Mellersta Norrland	5th	
2007	Tier 5	Division 3	Mellersta Norrland	7th	
2008	Tier 5	Division 3	Mellersta Norrland	9th	
2009	Tier 5	Division 3	Mellersta Norrland	9th	
2010	Tier 5	Division 3	Mellersta Norrland	1st	Promoted
2011	Tier 4	Division 2	Norrland	12th	Relegated

* League restructuring in 2006 resulted in a new division being created at Tier 3 and subsequent divisions dropping a level.

== Attendances ==
In recent seasons Junsele IF have had the following average attendances:

Season	Average attendance	Division / Section	Level
2005	Not available	Div 4 Ångermanland	Tier 5
2006	216	Div 3 Mellersta Norrland	Tier 5
2007	210	Div 3 Mellersta Norrland	Tier 5
2008	173	Div 3 Mellersta Norrland	Tier 5
2009	133	Div 3 Mellersta Norrland	Tier 5
2010	176	Div 3 Mellersta Norrland	Tier 5

* Attendances are provided in the Publikliga sections of the Svenska Fotbollförbundet website.

The attendance record for Junsele IF was around 1,400 spectators for the match against Ådalslidens SK in 1961 (Division 4 Ångermanland).
