= Junsele =

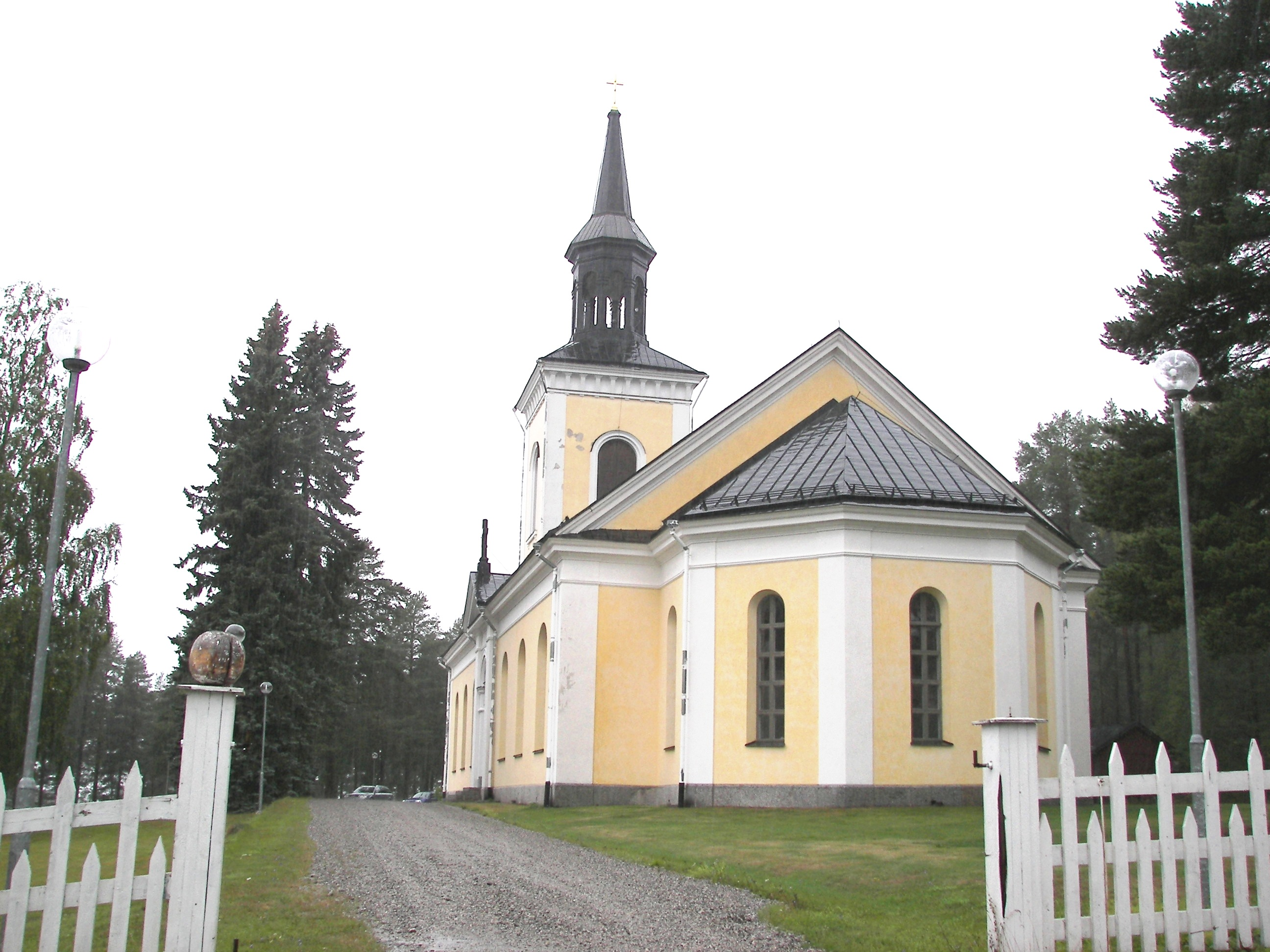
- Junsele church

- Location within Västernorrland Location within Sweden
- Coordinates: 63°41′N 16°54′E
- Country: Sweden
- Province: Ångermanland
- County: Västernorrland County
- Municipality: Sollefteå Municipality

Area
  - Total: 2.51 km^{2} (0.97 sq mi)

Population (31 December 2010)
  - Total: 895
  - Density: 357/km^{2} (920/sq mi)
- Time zone: UTC+1 (CET)
  - Summer (DST): UTC+2 (CEST)

Junsele (Swedish pronunciation: [ˈjɵ̌nːsɛlɛ]) is a locality situated in Sollefteå Municipality, Västernorrland County, Sweden with 895 inhabitants in 2010. The village is known for its zoo, where you can see for instance white tigers. There is a small tourist bureau, health centre, cinema and library, all situated in the Municipality office area. Places of interest nearby include the small, traditional forest village of Långvattnet, itself a designated nature reserve noted for its geological features and surrounded by fifty lakes, where most types of fishing are available. Bird life within the reserve is also of some interest.

== Location ==
Junsele is located far inland, some 100 kilometres (62 mi) by land from Örnsköldsvik, although road connection goes through longer distances. It is located east of the Scandinavian Mountains at a relatively moderate elevation.

== Climate ==
Junsele has a subarctic climate with large seasonal and diurnal variations. Summers are short and warm, sometimes very warm during July. Winters are extensive but less severe than in other parts of the world at such a northerly inland latitude. Cold extremes can be severe at times, with an all-time low of −45.8 °C (−50.4 °F) during a severe January 1987 cold wave.

Climate data for Junsele (2002–2018); extremes since 1909
Month	Jan	Feb	Mar	Apr	May	Jun	Jul	Aug	Sep	Oct	Nov	Dec	Year
Record high °C (°F)	10.6 (51.1)	10.1 (50.2)	15.4 (59.7)	22.0 (71.6)	28.5 (83.3)	32.0 (89.6)	33.6 (92.5)	30.4 (86.7)	26.4 (79.5)	21.7 (71.1)	12.5 (54.5)	9.5 (49.1)	33.6 (92.5)
Mean maximum °C (°F)	3.2 (37.8)	4.7 (40.5)	9.1 (48.4)	16.4 (61.5)	24.3 (75.7)	26.6 (79.9)	28.6 (83.5)	26.2 (79.2)	20.7 (69.3)	13.4 (56.1)	7.0 (44.6)	4.5 (40.1)	29.5 (85.1)
Mean daily maximum °C (°F)	−5.5 (22.1)	−3.3 (26.1)	2.1 (35.8)	8.1 (46.6)	14.9 (58.8)	18.7 (65.7)	21.9 (71.4)	19.6 (67.3)	14.0 (57.2)	6.3 (43.3)	0.3 (32.5)	−3.0 (26.6)	7.8 (46.1)
Daily mean °C (°F)	−9.7 (14.5)	−8.0 (17.6)	−3.3 (26.1)	2.7 (36.9)	8.6 (47.5)	12.7 (54.9)	15.9 (60.6)	14.0 (57.2)	9.2 (48.6)	2.6 (36.7)	−2.8 (27.0)	−7.0 (19.4)	2.9 (37.3)
Mean daily minimum °C (°F)	−13.8 (7.2)	−12.6 (9.3)	−8.7 (16.3)	−2.8 (27.0)	2.2 (36.0)	6.6 (43.9)	9.9 (49.8)	8.4 (47.1)	4.4 (39.9)	−1.1 (30.0)	−5.9 (21.4)	−11.0 (12.2)	−2.0 (28.3)
Mean minimum °C (°F)	−29.6 (−21.3)	−28.0 (−18.4)	−23.1 (−9.6)	−11.0 (12.2)	−4.8 (23.4)	0.2 (32.4)	3.7 (38.7)	1.3 (34.3)	−2.7 (27.1)	−11.2 (11.8)	−18.1 (−0.6)	−25.5 (−13.9)	−32.0 (−25.6)
Record low °C (°F)	−45.8 (−50.4)	−43.3 (−45.9)	−37.0 (−34.6)	−23.0 (−9.4)	−10.0 (14.0)	−4.0 (24.8)	0.0 (32.0)	−2.2 (28.0)	−10.2 (13.6)	−20.4 (−4.7)	−35.4 (−31.7)	−43.2 (−45.8)	−45.8 (−50.4)
Average precipitation mm (inches)	40.8 (1.61)	27.4 (1.08)	24.9 (0.98)	28.5 (1.12)	46.1 (1.81)	55.8 (2.20)	73.4 (2.89)	78.6 (3.09)	57.9 (2.28)	44.2 (1.74)	38.3 (1.51)	44.7 (1.76)	560.6 (22.07)
Source 1: SMHI Open Data
Source 2: SMHI climate data 2002–2018

== Sports ==
The following sports clubs are located in Junsele:

- Junsele IF
