= Långsele =

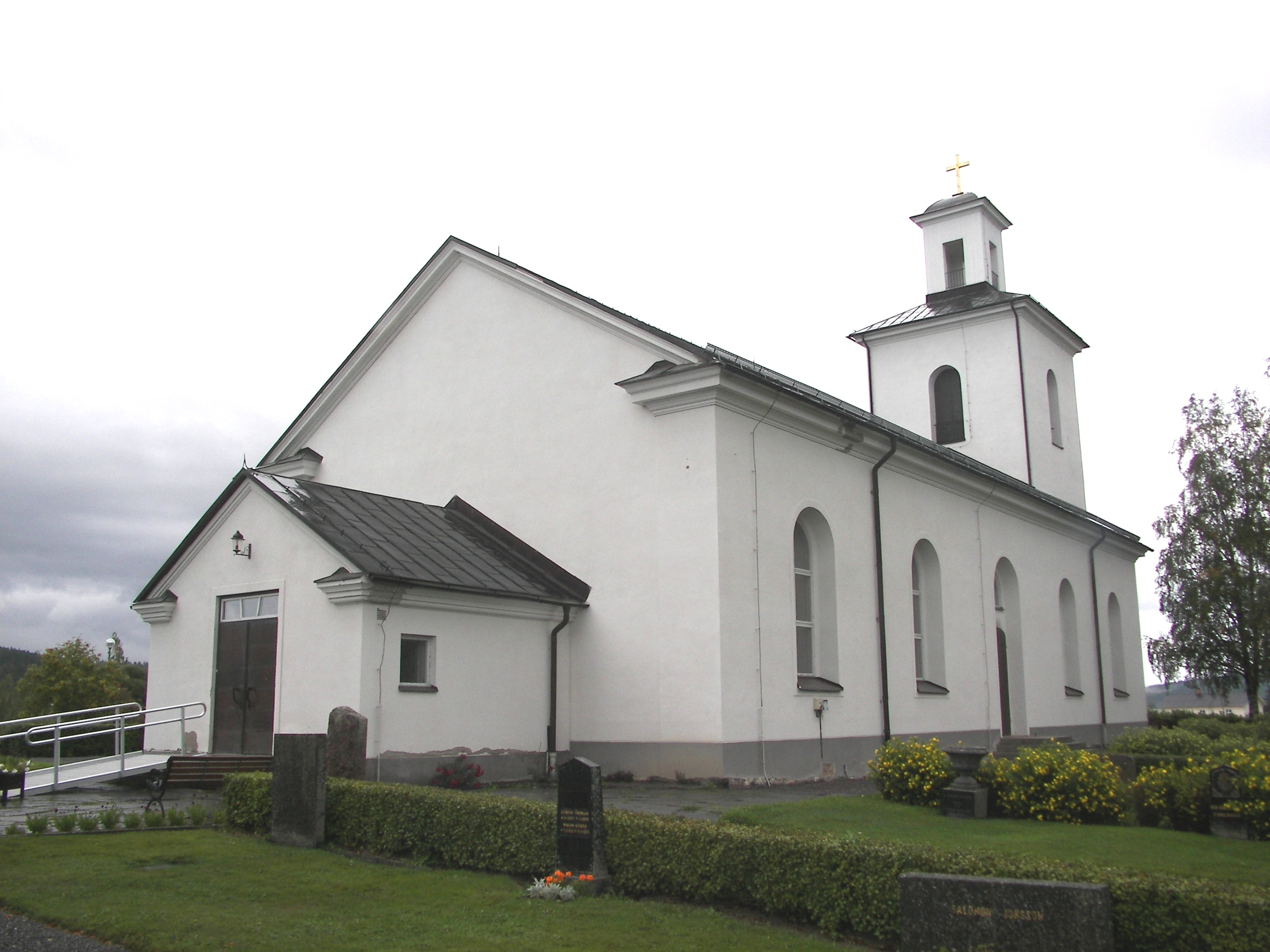
- Långsele Church

- Location within Västernorrland Location within Sweden
- Coordinates: 63°11′N 17°04′E
- Country: Sweden
- Province: Ångermanland
- County: Västernorrland County
- Municipality: Sollefteå Municipality

Area
  - Total: 2.45 km^{2} (0.95 sq mi)

Population (31 December 2010)
  - Total: 1,584
  - Density: 647/km^{2} (1,680/sq mi)
- Time zone: UTC+1 (CET)
  - Summer (DST): UTC+2 (CEST)

Långsele (Swedish pronunciation: [ˈlɔ̌ŋːsɛlɛ]) is a locality situated in Sollefteå Municipality, Västernorrland County, Sweden with 1,584 inhabitants in 2010.
