= Österforse =

- Location within Västernorrland Location within Sweden
- Coordinates: 63°09′N 17°01′E
- Country: Sweden
- Province: Ångermanland
- County: Västernorrland County
- Municipality: Sollefteå Municipality

Area
  - Total: 0.90 km^{2} (0.35 sq mi)

Population (31 December 2010)
  - Total: 204
  - Density: 227/km^{2} (590/sq mi)
- Time zone: UTC+1 (CET)
  - Summer (DST): UTC+2 (CEST)

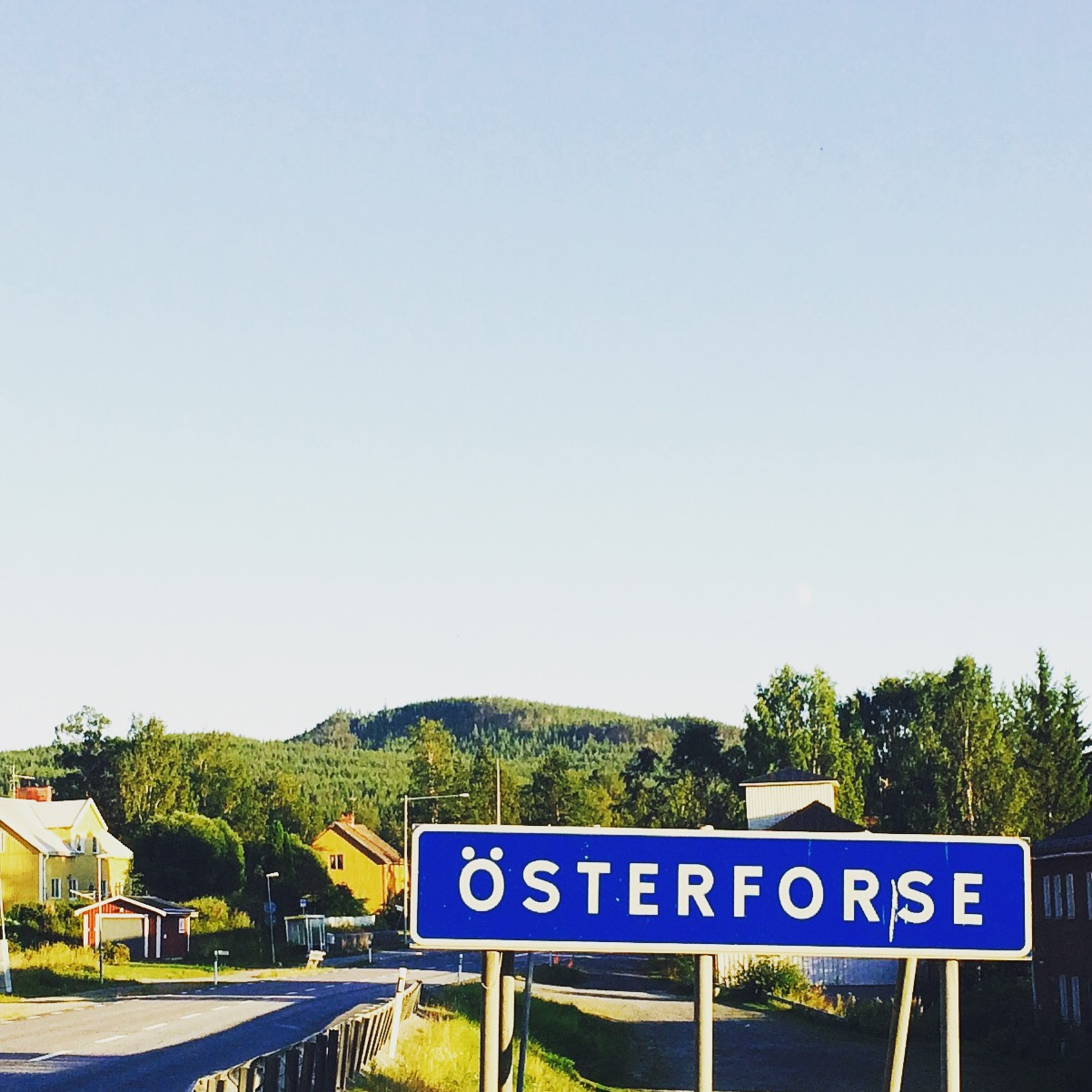

Österforse is a locality situated in Sollefteå Municipality, Västernorrland County, Sweden with 204 inhabitants in 2010.

== Climate ==
Österforse has a borderline continental/subarctic climate that is quite moderate in nature considering its inland position and latitude. Summer days are very warm for North Central Sweden, being heavily affected by its low elevation in comparison to areas further west such as Östersund. Temperatures are heavily dependent on wind direction and the convergences of warm southerly and cold northerly air. As a result, cold snaps can be quite extreme, resulting in an all-time low of −43 °C (−45 °F). The all-time heat record is from July 2, 2015 with 32.8 °C (91.0 °F) in an otherwise chilly summer.

Climate data for Österforse (2002–2018; extremes since 1901)
Month	Jan	Feb	Mar	Apr	May	Jun	Jul	Aug	Sep	Oct	Nov	Dec	Year
Record high °C (°F)	10.1 (50.2)	12.3 (54.1)	17.0 (62.6)	23.0 (73.4)	28.7 (83.7)	31.3 (88.3)	32.8 (91.0)	30.8 (87.4)	27.6 (81.7)	22.4 (72.3)	12.1 (53.8)	10.4 (50.7)	32.8 (91.0)
Mean maximum °C (°F)	4.5 (40.1)	6.0 (42.8)	10.5 (50.9)	17.3 (63.1)	24.6 (76.3)	27.0 (80.6)	29.2 (84.6)	27.2 (81.0)	21.6 (70.9)	14.8 (58.6)	8.6 (47.5)	5.8 (42.4)	30.1 (86.2)
Mean daily maximum °C (°F)	−4.3 (24.3)	−2.4 (27.7)	3.3 (37.9)	9.3 (48.7)	15.7 (60.3)	19.5 (67.1)	22.6 (72.7)	20.3 (68.5)	15.0 (59.0)	7.2 (45.0)	1.1 (34.0)	−2.0 (28.4)	8.8 (47.8)
Daily mean °C (°F)	−8.2 (17.2)	−6.8 (19.8)	−2.1 (28.2)	3.5 (38.3)	8.5 (47.3)	13.0 (55.4)	16.2 (61.2)	14.4 (57.9)	10.0 (50.0)	3.3 (37.9)	−1.9 (28.6)	−5.7 (21.7)	3.7 (38.6)
Mean daily minimum °C (°F)	−12.1 (10.2)	−11.2 (11.8)	−7.4 (18.7)	−2.4 (27.7)	2.2 (36.0)	6.5 (43.7)	9.8 (49.6)	8.5 (47.3)	4.9 (40.8)	−0.6 (30.9)	−4.8 (23.4)	−9.3 (15.3)	−1.3 (29.6)
Mean minimum °C (°F)	−26.3 (−15.3)	−25.4 (−13.7)	−20.8 (−5.4)	−10.0 (14.0)	−4.6 (23.7)	−0.1 (31.8)	3.4 (38.1)	1.6 (34.9)	−2.5 (27.5)	−9.8 (14.4)	−15.9 (3.4)	−22.6 (−8.7)	−29.3 (−20.7)
Record low °C (°F)	−43.0 (−45.4)	−42.5 (−44.5)	−31.4 (−24.5)	−18.0 (−0.4)	−7.8 (18.0)	−2.5 (27.5)	−0.2 (31.6)	−2.2 (28.0)	−9.8 (14.4)	−19.8 (−3.6)	−30.0 (−22.0)	−40.0 (−40.0)	−43.0 (−45.4)
Average precipitation mm (inches)	42.2 (1.66)	24.5 (0.96)	22.7 (0.89)	29.6 (1.17)	47.8 (1.88)	54.6 (2.15)	73.4 (2.89)	78.2 (3.08)	54.9 (2.16)	53.2 (2.09)	40.3 (1.59)	51.2 (2.02)	572.6 (22.54)
Source 1: SMHI Open Data
Source 2: SMHI climate data 2002-2018
