= Via ferrata =

Type of protected alpine climbing route

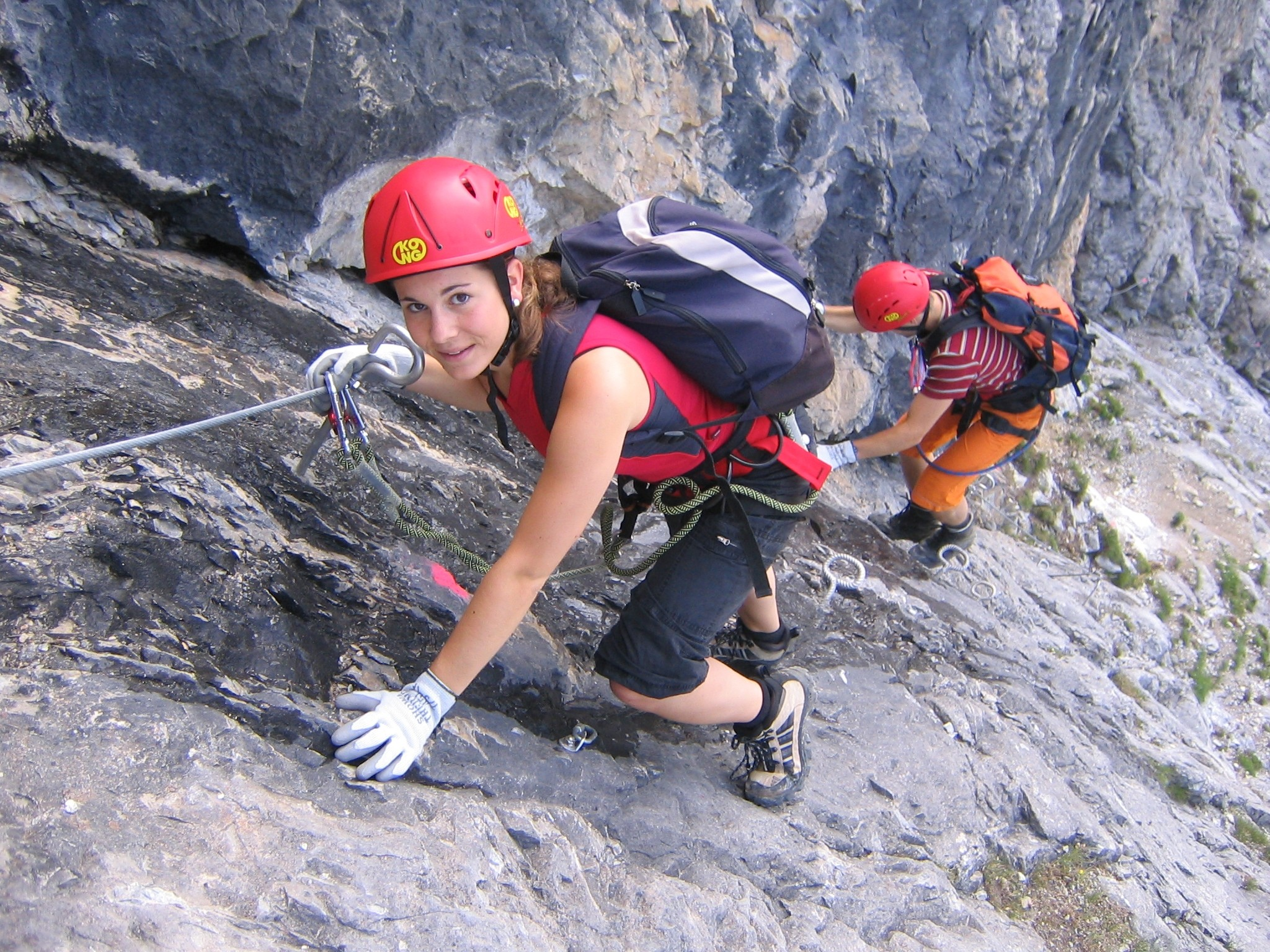
Climbers attached to steel cables on the via ferrata up Piz Mitgel in Graubünden, Switzerland

A via ferrata (Italian for "iron path", plural vie ferrate or in English via ferratas) is a protected climbing route found in the Alps and certain other alpine locations. The protection includes steel fixtures such as cables and railings to arrest the effect of any fall, which the climber can either hold onto or clip into using climbing protection. Some via ferratas can also include steel fixtures that provide aid in overcoming the obstacles encountered, including steel ladders and steel steps.

== Description ==
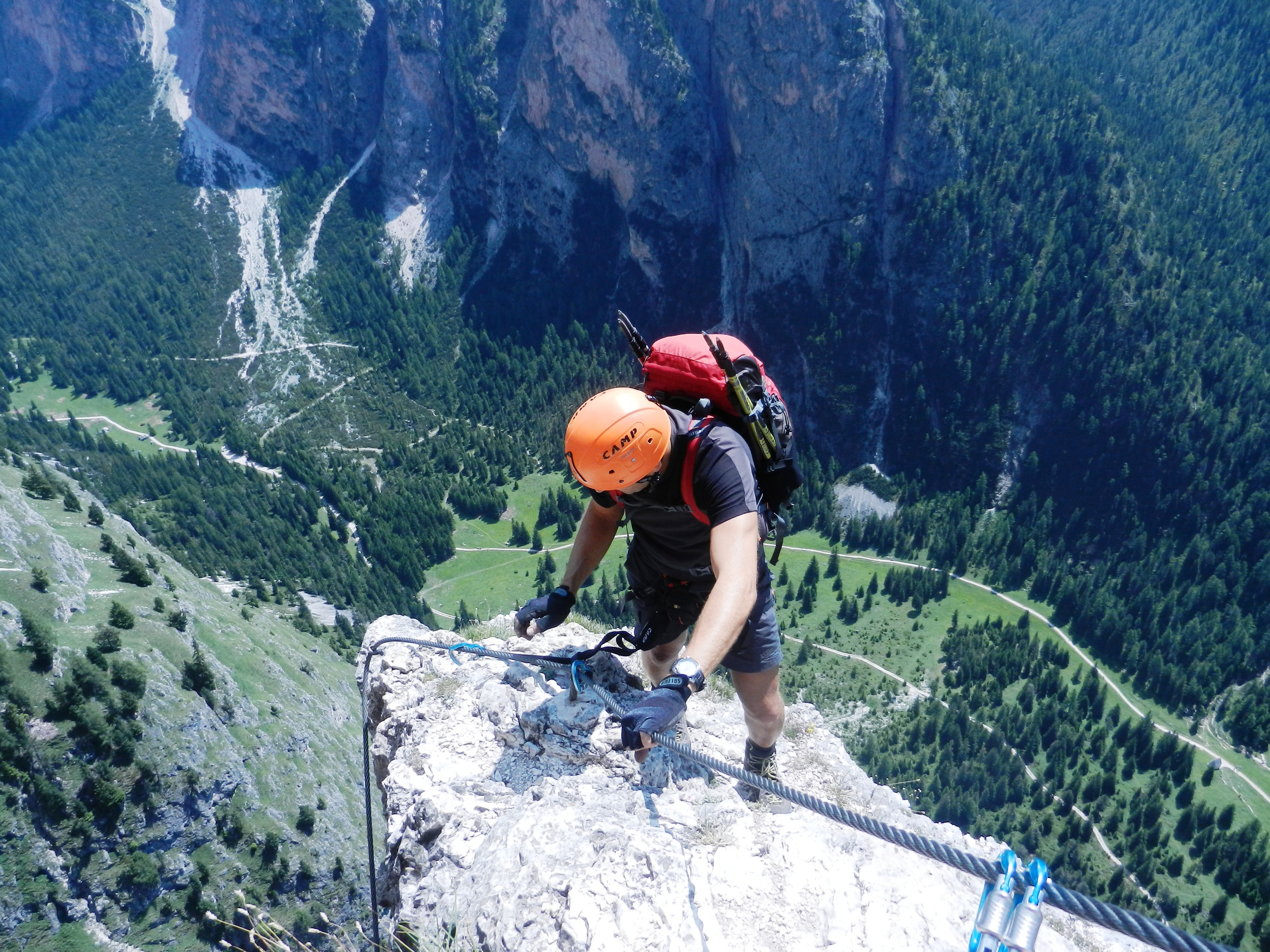
The top of the Ferrata Sandro Pertini in the Dolomites, Italy

A via ferrata is a climbing route in the mountains that employs steel cables, rungs, or ladders, fixed to the rock to which the climbers affix a harness with two leashes, which allows the climbers to secure themselves to the metal fixture and limit any fall. The cable and other fixtures, such as iron rungs (stemples), pegs, carved steps, and ladders and bridges, provide both footings and handholds, as well. This allows climbing on otherwise dangerous routes without the risks of unprotected scrambling and climbing or the need for technical climbing equipment. They expand the opportunities for accessing difficult peaks as an alternative to rock climbing and mountaineering, both of which require higher skills and more specialized equipment.

Via ferratas can vary in length from short routes taking less than an hour to long, demanding alpine routes covering significant distance and elevation (1,000 metres (3,300 ft) or more of ascent) and taking eight or more hours to complete. In certain areas, such as the Brenta Dolomites, it is possible to link via ferratas together, staying overnight in mountain refuges, and so undertake extensive multi-day climbing tours at high elevations. In difficulty, via ferratas can range from routes that are little more than paths, albeit in dramatic and exposed situations, to very steep and strenuous routes, overhanging in parts, demanding the strength—if not the technique—of serious rock climbing. Generally, via ferratas are done in ascent, although it is possible to descend them.

The origins of the via ferrata date back to the nineteenth century, but they are often associated with the First World War when several were built in the Dolomite mountain region of Italy to aid the movement of troops. Over 1000 via ferratas currently exist in the European Alps. The majority are found in Italy and Austria. Others are found in a number of European countries and a few places elsewhere. Via ferratas have traditionally been associated with limestone mountain regions, notably the Dolomites and the Northern Limestone Alps, as the steep nature of the terrain creates the need for some form of protected paths, while the presence of ledges and natural weaknesses means relatively easy but rewarding routes can often be created. However, they are now found in a range of different terrains.

== History ==
=== Origins ===
Simple protected paths, with ladders and basic protection aids, have probably existed in the Alps for centuries, helping to connect villages to their high pastures. Construction of what could be seen as the precursors of modern via ferratas dates back to the growth of Alpine exploration and tourism in the nineteenth century. In 1843, a route on the Dachstein was constructed under the direction of Friedrich Simony; it included a range of climbing aids with iron pins, hand hooks, carved footholds, and ropes. In 1869 a rope was fixed between the summits of Grossglockner, and in 1873 fixed protection was installed on the Zugspitze. In the Pyrenees, iron climbing aids were installed on the Pic du Midi d'Ossau in 1880, and in the Ordesa in 1881. The Northern Limestone Alps saw the first routes still in use today as via ferratas: the Heilbronner Way in the German Allgau Alps was constructed in 1899, shortly followed by the Eggersteig (1903) and Wildauersteig (1911) in the Wilder Kaiser in Austria. In the Dolomites, the climbing path up the West ridge of the Marmolada (German: Marmolata) was installed in 1903, and the Possnecker Path up Piz Selva in the Sella Group was completed before the First World War.

In 1910, Gustav Jahn and August Čepl, a Viennese master locksmith, built the Hans von Haid Steig in the Preiner Wall (1,783 m) of the Rax, East Austria.

=== First World War: Dolomites ===
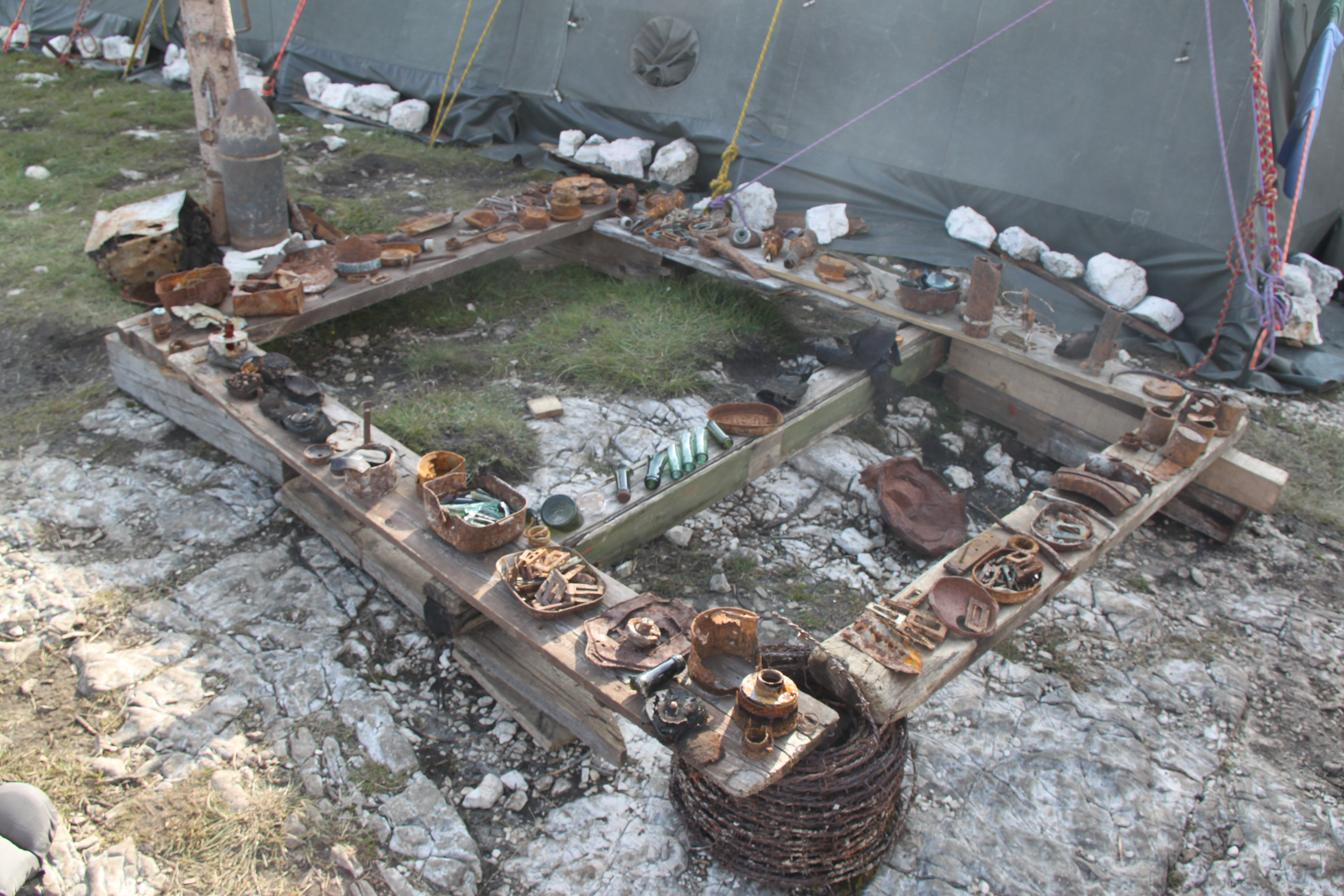
Unexploded ordnance from World War I found during demining on Monte Piana in the Dolomites

In 1914 the Dolomites were part of the Austro-Hungarian Empire, which was part of the Central Powers during the First World War. In 1915, Italy joined the alliance of Britain, France, and Russia and declared war on the Central Powers. Austro-Hungarian troops were heavily committed in Russia and it immediately withdrew to a defensive line that ran through the Dolomites. The initially weak Austro-Hungarian troops were strongly supported by local old and very young men (Standschützen) who simulated a very strong line of defense for the attacking Italians. Only later could local elite troops such as Kaiserjäger and Kaiserschützen be relocated from the Eastern Front towards Italy. Until the Flitsch-Tolmein offensive (Battle of Caporetto) in the autumn of 1917, the Austro-Hungarians (supported by troops from Southern Germany) and the Italians fought a ferocious war in the mountains of the Dolomites; not only against each other but also against the hostile conditions. Both sides tried to gain control of the peaks to site observation posts and field guns. To help troops move about at high elevations in very difficult conditions, permanent lines were fixed to rock faces and ladders were installed so that troops could ascend steep faces. They also tried to create and control tunnels below the peaks to attack from there (see Mines on the Italian Front). Trenches, dugouts, and other relics of the First World War can be found alongside many via ferratas. Since dangerous ammunition remains and the like can still be found today, warnings are given in the area of the former main battle line against digging and picking up old metal parts. There is an extensive open-air museum on 5 Torri, and around Lagazuoi, where very heavy fighting took place. This wartime network of via ferratas has been restored, although not until well after the Second World War: steel cables have replaced ropes, and iron ladders and metal rungs anchored into the rock have taken the place of the flimsy wooden structures used by the troops. Most of these routes are now maintained by the Club Alpino Italiano (CAI; Italian Alpine Club) and the South Tyrol Alpine Club (AVS).

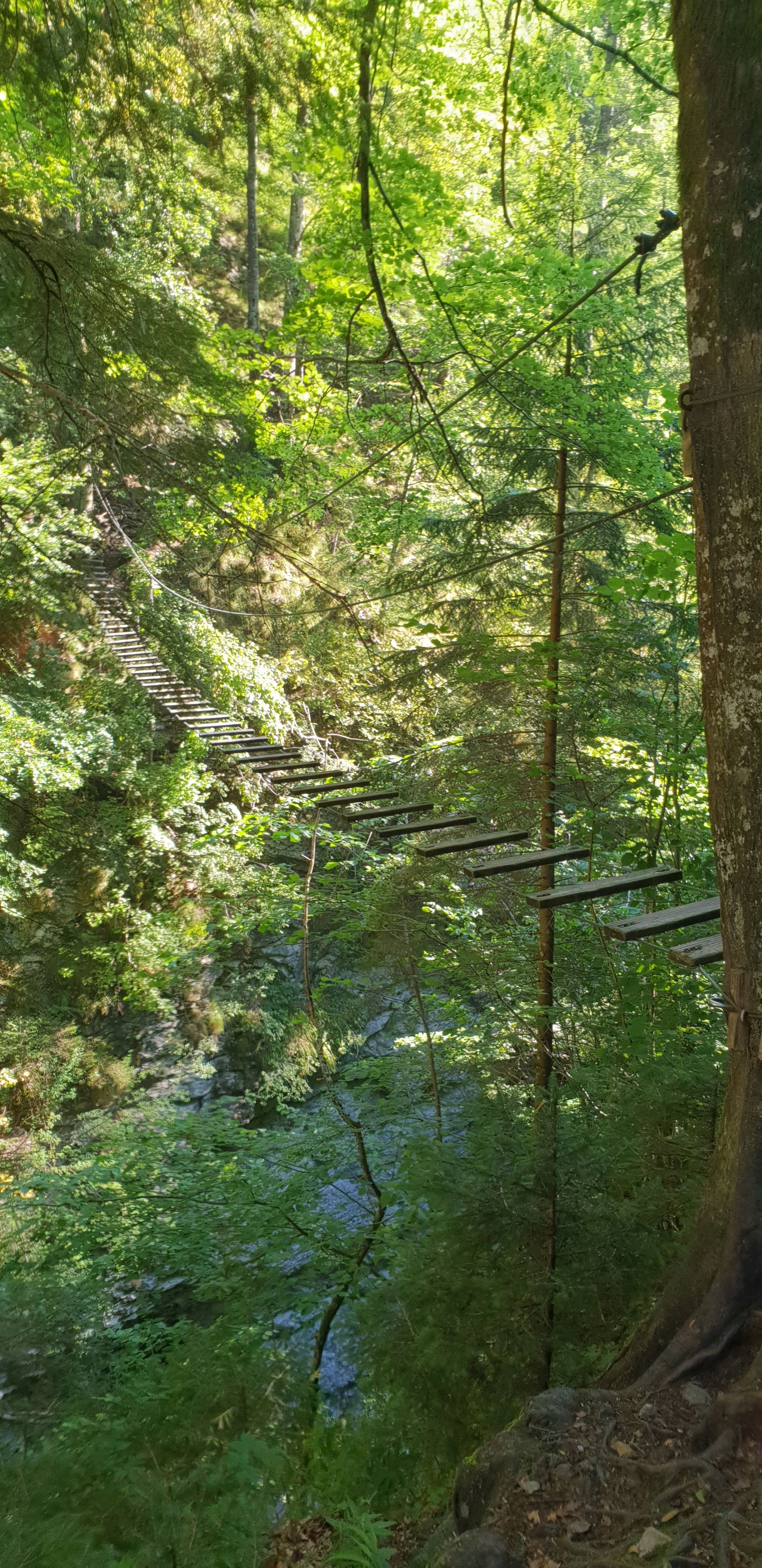
Wire bridge "Seufzerbrücke" at Postalmklamm Klettersteig near Salzburg, Austria

=== Via delle Bocchette: the classic via ferrata ===
In the 1930s, the Società degli Alpinisti Tridentini (SAT) together with the CAI began working on shortening and improving access to the climbing routes in the Brenta Dolomites, by installing artificial aids and protection. Natural lines and routes in the rock were linked up and a system of routes began to be developed, work continuing after the Second World War. The Via delle Bocchette was discovered by mountain walkers and gradually gained a classic reputation in its own right, a reputation which it still retains. In developing the Via delle Bocchette, a certain ethic was followed – climbing aids were kept to a minimum, and the routes deliberately do not access any summits, an approach which is sometimes but not always followed by modern via ferratas. The Via delle Bocchette helped establish the idea of doing via ferratas in their own right, rather than as access to summits or to climbs.

=== 21st century ===
In the 1970s and 80s development remained focused on traditional areas (the Dolomites and the Northern Limestone Alps). Routes were mostly developed by the climbing community often with the active involvement of one of the relevant Alpine Clubs (although there was occasional controversy and opposition to some added routes). In the 1990s and 2000s, development became more commercial and involved more organizations: via ferratas began to be seen as a useful way to encourage tourism and increase the range of activities available to visitors, and so routes were developed by local communities, outdoor activity centres, cable car companies, mountain refuges and others, as well as continuing involvement by the Alpine clubs. Development of via ferratas has spread out of its original areas to the rest of the Alps and beyond. The first via ferrata in France was constructed in 1988 (Via Ferrata de la Grande Falaise, Freissinières, Grading C/D) While high mountain via ferratas have continued to be developed, the modern era has seen the rise of more "sporting" routes, sometimes closer to the valley and often more challenging in nature, with severely steep sections and requiring high strength. Routes have been built in dramatic locations, alongside waterfalls or in canyons. Other routes include features such as wire bridges and even zip wires, designed to increase their appeal to visitors. Climbing via ferratas came to be recognised as a valid mountain activity in own right, with its own guidebooks, equipment, grading system and enthusiasts, with an increasing number of locations becoming available to undertake via ferrata climbs.

== Grading ==
Various grading systems exist for via ferratas. Most focus on the level of difficulty of the hardest passage and use a 5- or 6-point scale. Miller uses grades 1 to 5. The Kurt Schall guides (Klettersteig-Atlas series) use a primarily an A to F 6-point scale and 5 intermediate grades are also used (e.g. C/D). The website www.klettersteig.de uses grades 1 to 6, although based on the Schall system. In France, the 6 classic alpine grades are used: F – Facile; PD – Peu Difficile; AD – Assez Difficile; D – Difficile: TD – Très Difficile: ED – Extrêmement Difficile (although these grades bear no comparison to their Alpine counterparts). An outline of a 5-level grading system is provided below, but clearly individual guidebooks grades should be checked against their own definitions.

Comparison
Schall	Hüsler	France	Description
A (easy)	K1	F	Straightforward path, but exposed. Plenty of climbing aids, possible short ladders. Challenging walking rather than climbing. Sure-footedness and a good head for heights are the main requirements.
B (moderately difficult)	K2 (K3)	PD	Some steep terrain, smaller footholds, but climbing aids provided. Longer ladders possible. Essentially protected but exposed scrambling. Some use of arms.
C (difficult)	K3 (K4)	AD (D)	Steep to very steep rock, adequate climbing aids, long ladders possible (or even briefly overhanging). Good fitness and some arm strength required.
D (very difficult)	K4 (K5)	D / TD	Very steep to vertical, maybe short/well aided overhanging sections, mainly very exposed. Some climbing aids but often wire rope only. Strong arms and hands required.
E (extremely difficult)	(K5) K6	ED	Vertical to overhanging; consistently exposed; very small footholds or friction climbing, usually no climbing aids other than the wire. Sustained arm strength required. Easier sections may be unprotected.

One criticism of these grading system is that they ignore the severity and length of the difficulties – a long, high mountain route with extensive passages of grade D is very different from a short valley route also graded D, but with only a brief difficult section. To overcome this, additional ratings on the seriousness of the route are often provided – the Kurt Schall guides use a five-level adjectival scale; Smith and Fletcher use a three-point scale A–C. The old Hofler/Werner guidebooks use a single general grade on an A-G scale. Most guidebooks provide some further information to help assess the nature of a route, such as the length of the route, the maximum height reached, and even a grade for the quality of the protection.

== Equipment ==
=== Background ===
For many years, via ferratas were climbed using simple climbing equipment, namely carabiners fixed to short lengths of rope or slings attached to a chest (or sit) harness, on the basis that one would not fall very far. However, it gradually became apparent that these systems did not prevent serious injury. With only a short length of rope to absorb the energy of a fall which can be much longer, the fall factor (which in rock climbing does not normally exceed two) can be high. These high factors generate considerable forces which the human body, as well as most items of climbing equipment, cannot withstand, leading to serious injury and equipment failure. To address this, a number of devices have been developed to act as shock absorbers or progressive brakes. They aim to dissipate the energy of the fall more effectively than a short rope length and so keep the climber and equipment intact.

However, in spite of these equipment developments and the perception of via ferratas as being more secure and safe than rock climbing, people are more likely to injure themselves if they do fall, partly because of these elevated fall factors and partly because there are often rungs and steps on which to land. After a fatal via ferrata accident in August 2012 where both elastic lanyards on the energy-absorbing systems (EAS) in a via ferrata set failed, the International Mountaineering and Climbing Federation (UIAA) worked with manufacturers to identify and recall several models of EAS systems.

In the European Economic Area, energy absorbing systems for use in via ferrata climbing are classed as personal protective equipment (PPE) and are subject to the safety requirements and conformity assessment procedures of the PPE regulation (EU) 2016/425. The requirements of the Regulation are supported by a European Harmonised Standard, EN 958. This standard was revised in 2017 to include several redesigned tests to prevent the type of failures involved in the 2012 accident.

=== Via ferrata set ===
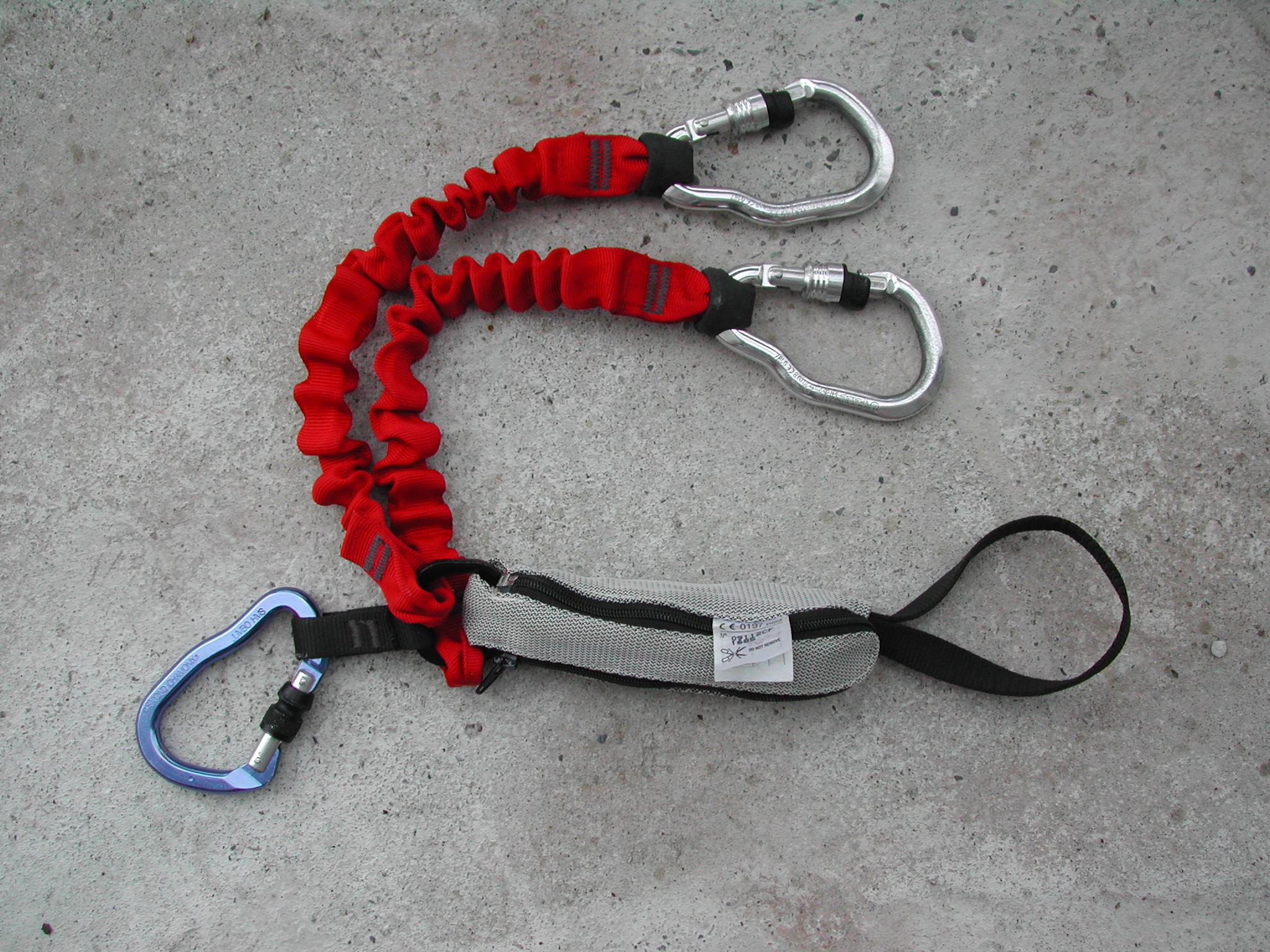
A Y-shaped lanyard with progressive-tear energy absorber

The "via ferrata set" comprises a lanyard and two carabiners. The lanyard consists of an energy-absorbing system, two arms that connect to the cable with the carabiners, and a means of connecting to the harness. Modern lanyards use a "Y" tape configuration, which is currently the only type approved by UIAA, as it is simpler and safer to use and harder to use inappropriately. Using the Y lanyard, both arms should be attached to the steel line, although the system still functions if only one is clipped. However, some earlier lanyards use a "V" configuration. These were the first to be developed but suffer from a major limitation – it is essential to clip only one arm at a time onto the cable. If both arms are clipped, the energy absorber will not work. Some lanyards also have a short third arm which allows the climber to rest on steep sections. Some types of commercially available lanyards have retractable arms to keep them out of the way.

==== Energy absorber ====
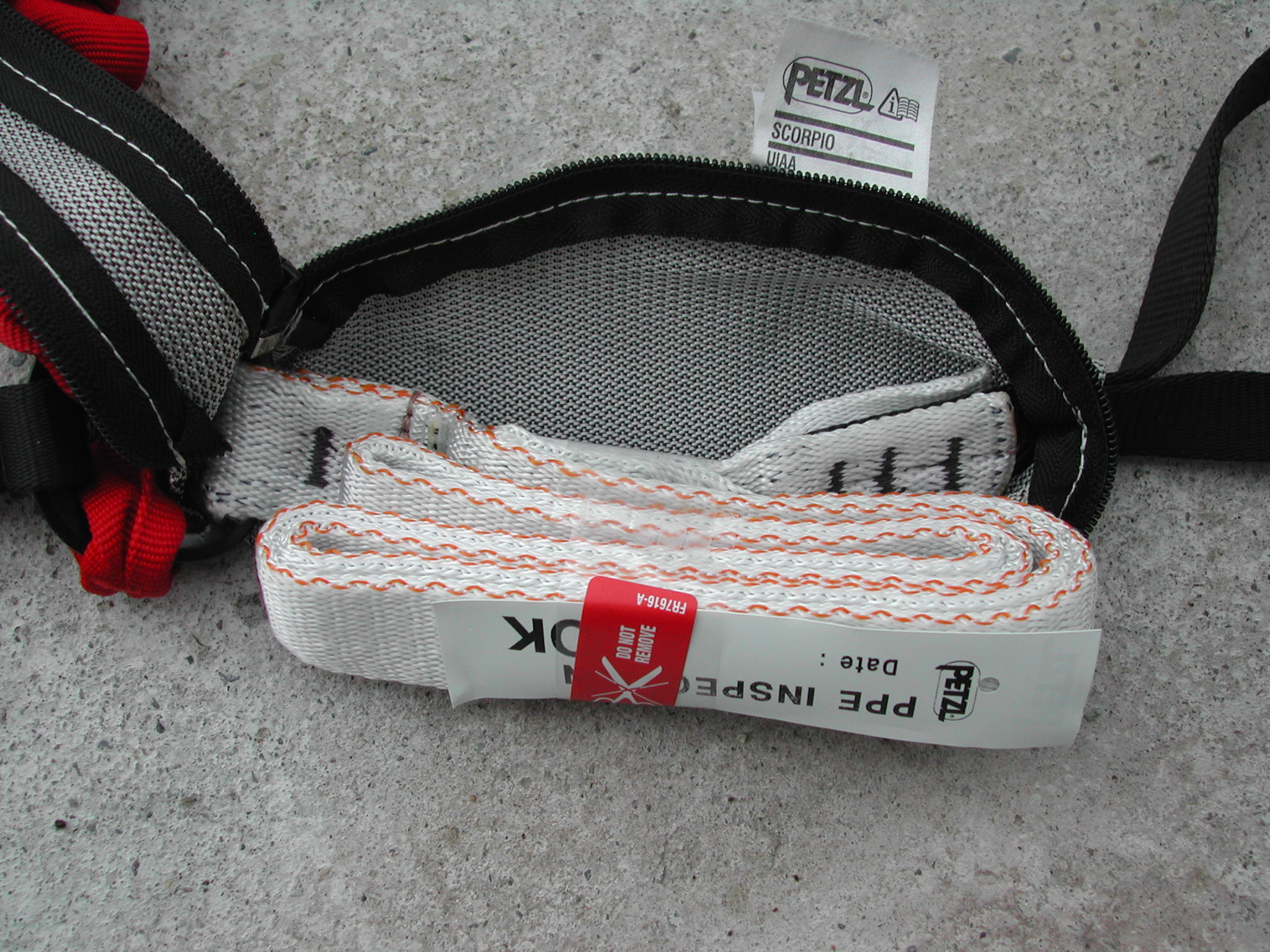
Close-up of a progressive-tear energy absorber

The main type of energy absorber in use today is a tearing energy absorber. This consists of a length of webbing specially sewn together to allow progressive tearing in case of a fall. Such devices can only be used once to arrest a serious fall and will exhibit visible damage afterward. The advantages of this type of absorber are that it is compact and that it can be easily verified that it is not being reused after a fall (particularly valuable in the case of rented equipment); the disadvantage is that it can be used only once, leaving the climber unprotected in case of a second fall.

The other type of energy absorber is a metal braking device with a rope passing through it and attached to the harness. Previously popular, these have been largely withdrawn after the re-evaluation of via ferrata safety that occurred after a 2012 accident.

== Notable routes ==
=== Austria ===
Austria, with as of 2009 over 550 Klettersteige, is arguably the country that has most enthusiastically embraced the via ferrata – with via ferratas promoted as a way to experience nature and with the regional sections of the ÖAV (Austrian Alpine Club) basing many of their harder walks around via ferratas. Via ferratas in Austria have a long history, with routes being established at the start of the 20th century in the Northern Limestone Alps. For many years route development remained focused in this area and it is only recently that via ferratas have been built across the Austrian Alps. As a broad generalisation, routes in Austria fall somewhere between the long mountain routes of the Dolomites and the shorter sporting routes of France. That said, the via ferrata currently (2012) considered the hardest technically in the world is in Austria: the "Arena" variant of the Bürgeralm-Panorama-Klettersteig in Styria.

The Northern Limestone Alps, which run from near Vienna to the Swiss border, remain at the heart of Austrian klettersteig, with routes concentrated in key mountain groups: the Rax (where some of the oldest via ferratas are), the Hohe Wand, the Totes Gebirge, the Dachstein, the Wilder Kaiser, the Karwendel. The Dachstein mountains in Styria, in particular, are home to several notable via ferratas, including the Ramsauer Klettersteig, the Jubiläumsklettersteig, and on the northern side of the Dachstein, the Seewand Klettersteig, which is one of the hardest long routes in Austria. However, perhaps the highlight is the long and difficult Dachstein Super Ferrata, recently created by linking three routes, and possibly the most challenging via ferrata overall in Austria. Other notable routes in the Northern Limestone Alps are the Innsbrucker Klettersteig in the Karwendel and the Tajakante Klettersteig in the Mieminger Chain just to the east (both routes are in Tirol, near Innsbruck).

The Central Eastern Alps have seen more recent development, with large numbers of routes in the Ötztal and the Stubai Alps, and on either side of the Hohe Tauern. Highly regarded routes are the Schlicker Klettersteig and Ilmspitz Klettersteig in the Stubai, the Tiroler Weg in the Otztal, and the Bella Vista Klettersteig on the south side of the Hohe Tauern in Carinthia. Other via ferratas in this area climb a number of 3000m summits. The Southern Limestone Alps in Carinthia and East Tirol are more traditional grounds for via ferratas. Several routes lie near the Italian border (in the Carnic Alps) which formed the front line in World War I and some via ferratas pass fortifications from the conflict, including the Weg der 26er which ascends the Hohe Warte, the highest peak of the range.

=== Italy ===
There are more than 400 via ferratas in Italy, over half of them located in the Dolomites.

==== Dolomites ====
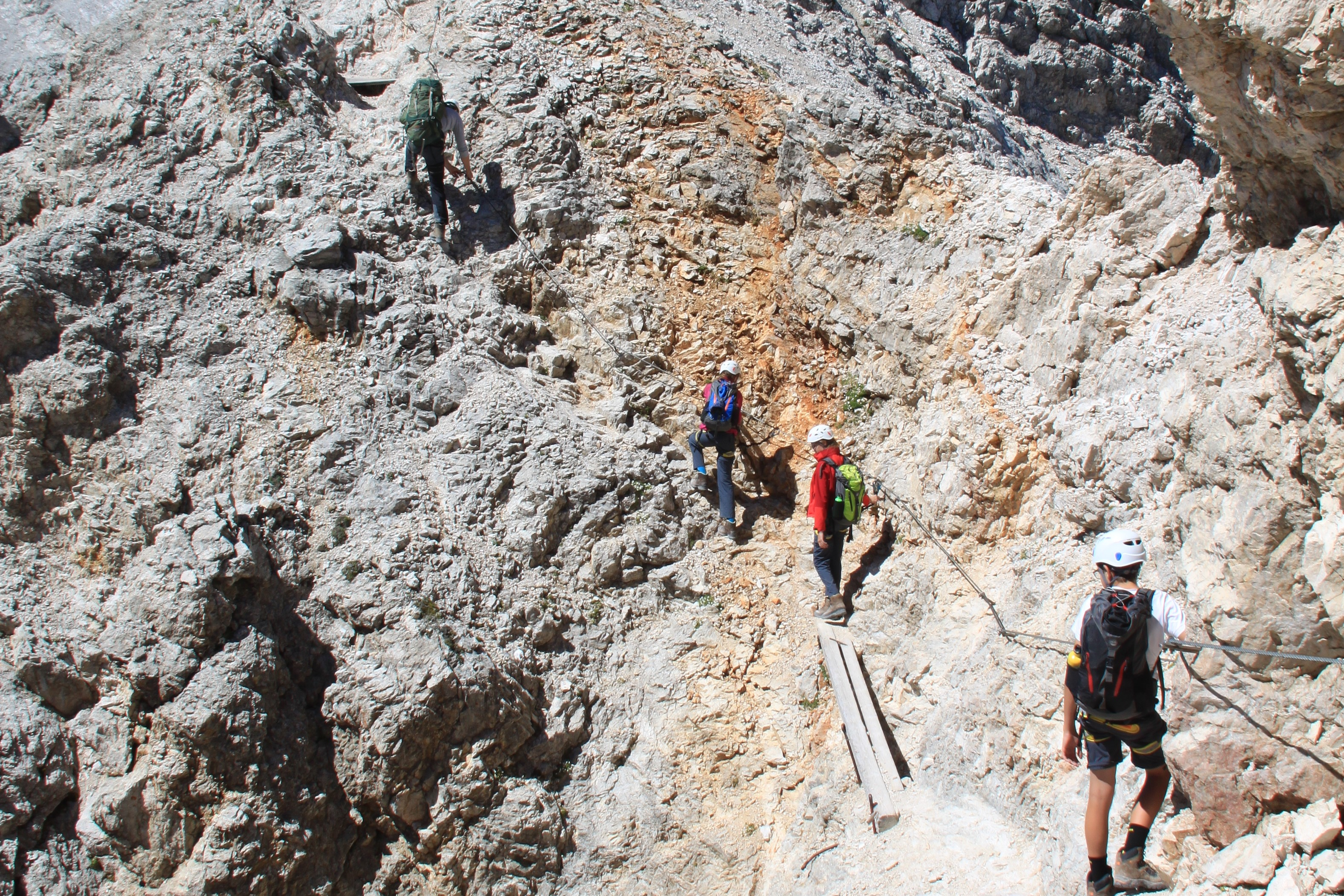
At the beginning of the VF Ivano Dibona at approx. 3000m.

As well as historic via ferratas based on World War I fortifications, the Dolomites are particularly renowned for their dramatic high mountain via ferratas. Several of these provide challenging ways to reach some of the summits in the range. Among the more notable routes are:

- An interesting and historic route is the VF Ivano Dibona, involving a traverse of the main Monte Cristallo ridge. The complete route takes about eight hours starting at Rifugio Lorenzi (2950 m) by the top of the Rio Gere lift system. It begins by crossing a characteristic suspension bridge, and trends mostly downhill, passing several World War I fortifications. It is often preceded by undertaking the Via Ferrata Marino Bianchi, which goes from the top of the lift to a subsidiary summit of the Monte Cristallo.
- The via ferrata della Marmolada (Hans-Seyffert-Weg) which climbs the west ridge of the Marmolada, at 3343 m the highest summit in the Dolomites. The route dates from before World War I.
- Via ferratas Gianni Aglio and Giuseppe Olivieri (also known as the via ferrata Punta Anna) which provide a very airy route to the summit of the Tofana di Mezzo (3244 m).
- Via ferrata Giovanni Lipella which climbs the neighbouring Tofana di Rozes (3225 m). The route starts through a wartime tunnel.
- Via ferrata degli Alleghesi; a long and classic route to the summit of the Civetta (3220 m), opened in 1966.
- The via ferrata Bolver-Lugli (constructed in 1970 by mountain guides from San Martino di Castrozza) ascends the Cimon della Pala the "Matterhorn of the Dolomites" as far as the bivouac Fiamme Gialle at (3,005 m). From there, the "Variation for the Summit", involving moderate climbing, is needed to reach the summit at (3,184 m).
- Via ferrata Cesco Tomaselli which climbs the Punta Sud of the Fanes group (2980 m), a challenging route with minimal climbing aids and unprotected sections, and another via ferrata as the descent route.
- The via ferrata delle Mésules (Pössnecker Path), one of the first via ferratas, which climbs the Piz Selva (2941 m) in the Sella Group, via a route which is "scenically magnificent" and still demanding today.
- Via ferrata Piz da Lech, on the other side of the Sella group climbs the south face of the Piz da Lech (2911m)(Boeseekofel) above Corvara, a popular half-day route of medium difficulty.
- Ferrata Gianni Costantini, which climbs the Cima Moiazza Sud (2878 m) near the Civetta, is one of the hardest, longest (at 1000 m) and most celebrated routes in Dolomites
- Via ferrata Zandonella (South) perhaps the best of several routes that climb the Croda Rossa di Sesto (2936 m) (the Sextener Rotwand) This area has extensive World War I remains and nearby is the much easier Strada degli Alpini, perhaps the most renowned of the via ferratas based on routes created in World War I.
- Alta via Bruno Federspiel, a very long route along the Rizzoni ridge with excellent views. It traverses the Spiz di Taricignon (2647 m) in the Fassaner Dolomites to the SW of the Marmolada.

Probably the most unusual via ferrata is the via ferrata Lagazuoi Tunnels. Fighting for control of Mount Lagazuoi in World War I, Austrian and Italian troops built a series of tunnels through the mountains. The aim was to tunnel close to the enemy and detonate explosives to destroy their fortifications. A via ferrata now uses these tunnels, allowing one to descend into and through the mountain.

There are a great many other via ferratas in the Dolomites, including many shorter routes such as the easy Via ferrata Averau, or the difficult Via ferrata del Canalone. There are via ferratas in the valleys around the Dolomites, such as Via ferrata Burrone Giovannelli near Mezzocorona, in the Etschtal (Val d'Adige) which ascends a gorge.

Brenta

To the west of the main Dolomites, on the other side of the A22/E45 road, are the smaller Brenta Dolomites, which are compact but dramatic, and rise above the town of Madonna di Campiglio. The Brenta contain a dense network of via ferratas, the core of which is the Via delle Bocchette system, consisting of several sections, including the Sentiero Bocchette Alte and the Sentiero delle Bocchette Centrali. The northern end of the range can be reached by lifts from Madonna di Campiglio, and it is possible to spend several days at high elevation on the network of via ferratas, staying at mountain huts. However, in accordance with the wishes of the region's climbers, the routes do not reach any major summits.

==== Other ====
There are over 150 via ferratas in Italy outside of the Dolomites, most of them constructed fairly recently. There are notable concentrations at the northern end of Lake Garda, in the Aosta Valley, in the mountains east of Lake Como and in the Friuli region, split between the Carnic and Julian Alps. Some of the more notable routes are:

- Via ferrata del Venticinquennale, in Canzo, in the middle of Lake Como triangle
- Via dell´Amicizia, which climbs above the town of Riva del Garda on Lake Garda
- Via ferrata Ernesto Che Guevara, on Monte Casale, north of Lake Garda in Trento
- Via Ferrata del Centenario C.A.O. on the west shore of Lake Como, the best regarded of the Lake Como via ferratas.
- Via Ferrata del Monte Emilius / Via ferrata du mont-Émilius, on Monte Emilius in Aosta Valley (one of the highest via ferratas in the Alps).
- Via Italiana, in the Julian Alps in Friuli (one of only 3 via ferratas rated 6* by www.klettersteig.de).
- Via ferrata Deanna Orlandini, in Genova
- Via Ferrata del Cabirol (IT), on Capo Caccia, Alghero, Sardegna (a coastal via ferrata).
- Via Ferrata Blu Selvaggio, one of the paths of Selvaggio Blu, Ogliastra, Sardinia

=== France ===
France saw its first via ferrata in 1988 – La Grande Falaise in Freissinière in the Ecrins. This was shortly followed by the via ferratas at les Vigneaux just to the north (the easier route, La Voie du Colombier, is the most popular in France with 15,000 climbers per year) and the Aiguillette du Lauzet, a little further north (a more traditional high mountain via ferrata). There are now some 200 via ferratas in France, located throughout the French Alps, and with a few routes in the Massif Central, the Pyrenees and even in Corsica. They are well distributed across the six French grades, with handful each of F and ED, the bulk falling within the four middle classifications. As via ferratas have developed across the country, some have identified a distinct "french style, with metal rungs driven into improbable overhangs", spiced with wire bridges, and an emphasis on thrill seeking – although some criticise French routes as having an excess of iron climbing aids. Dramatic features underpin many of the more notable routes: long suspension bridges (59m at the via ferrata de la Grande Fistoire), wire "monkey" bridges (via ferrata de la Chal); routes into and across gorges (the "spectacular" via ferrata Gorges de la Durance); routes up and around waterfalls (via ferrata de l´Adret: la Passerelle) or simply overhanging and strenuous (the neighbouring via ferrata de l´Adret: Le Bastion).

Other routes facilitate visits to historic sites. Les Mines du Grand Clôt near the village of La Grave in the Hautes Alpes department takes the climber up a sheer cliff where a lead mine operated with little success between 1807 and 1925. This route is illustrated with sign boards in English and French telling the story of the struggle to extract small amounts of ore in very difficult conditions. Another via near Lumbin in the department of Isère, the Vire des Lavandières, passes an old section of route called the Échelle des Maquisards built in 1943 and used by resistance fighters during the Second World War.

Responsibility for maintaining via ferratas in France lies with the commune in which the via is situated. Maintenance can be costly depending on location, with vias at higher elevations being subject to damage by snow and ice through the winter months. Some communes have decided to fund this maintenance by charging an admission fee, but this applies to very few vias and most remain free of charge.

=== Spain ===
The first via ferrata in Spain was built in 1954 (Canal del Palomo, Huesca, Grading D). After that, it took longer before a sporty route was created in 1993 at Montserrat in Catalonia. Today there may be around 200 via ferratas in Spain. (Note: Listings of Spanish via ferratas can be found at rocjumper.com (Spanish), deandar.com (Spanish) and klettersteig.de (German).) Most of them are located in Catalonia, Aragon, Comunidad Valenciana and Andalusia (around Ronda and Málaga). Due to the weather, they can mostly be used all year round. Only a few routes lead to a summit. The most difficult via ferrata in the world is on the Canary Islands (Via Ferrata Extraplomix, Gran Canaria, unique Grading G). A specialty are routes that lead through waterless canals (e.g. Canal de las Damas, Collbató, Grading D).

=== Switzerland ===
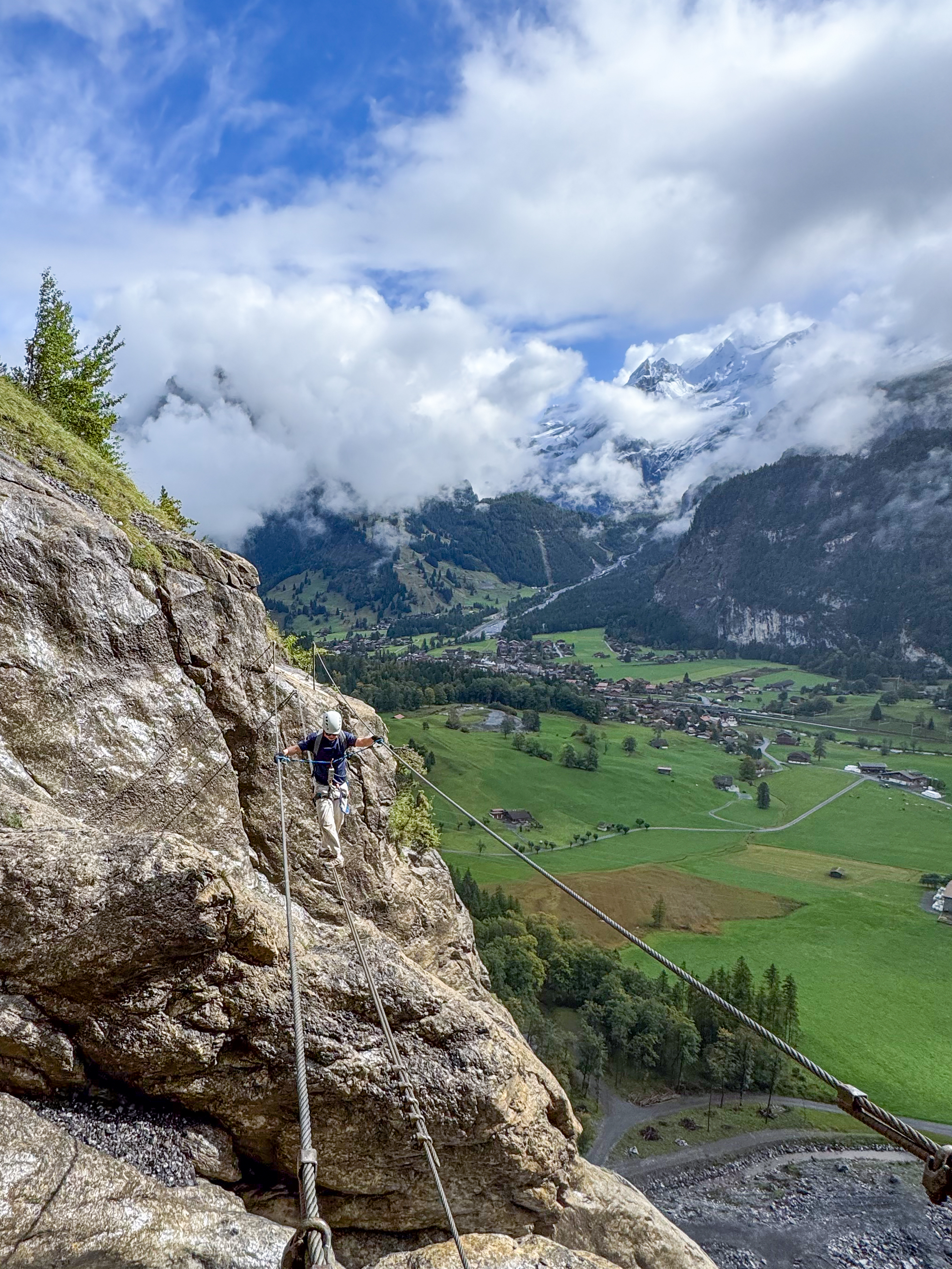
Kandersteg-Allmenalp in Berner Oberland

Despite its central position in the Alps, via ferratas took a long time to arrive in Switzerland. It was not until 1993 that the Tälli Klettersteig, the first real Swiss via ferrata (and still considered one of the best), was created on the sheer southern faces of Gadmer Flue in the Urner Alps. Even then nothing much further happened for several years, but in this century there has been a rapid development of via ferratas, with over 150 now listed. According to the Rother guide, the Swiss via ferratas are typically similar in character to the "sport" via ferratas in France; however, they are usually not as generously engineered with artificial holds so that climbers have to make contact with the rock and think about where the next foothold is.

Via ferratas are now spread across Switzerland, but particularly in the central and western areas. Areas with a large number of via ferratas are the Bernese Oberland with 32 routes and the Valais with 39 routes. In central Switzerland there are several routes around Lake Lucerne, in the Urner and Vierwaldstätter alps (15 and 17 routes respectively), with Engelberg developing into a notable centre for ferrata – here, the Fürenwand-Klettersteig is considered the "most spectacular". The range of routes is diverse: "action-packed" gorge routes (Alpine gorge in Saas Fee, Gorner gorge near Zermatt); panoramic routes onto 3000m peaks (Jegisteig [Jägihorn] and Mittaghorn Klettersteig, both near Saas Fee); high alpine challenges (Salbit-Kettenweg near Andermatt); and demanding athletic routes (Via ferrata San Salvatore near Lugano). The Rother guide considers that the most outstanding routes with regard to scenery and grading are the Braunwalder via ferrata in the eastern Swiss canton of Glarus and the Daubenhorn via ferrata near Leukerbad in the Valais. Also known as Leukerbadner Klettersteig (1&2), the latter is also the longest via ferrata in Switzerland.

=== Germany ===
There are about 180 via ferratas in Germany, the easiest of which can be approached without special equipment. Many are in the southern regions of Germany near the Austrian border. There are also many via ferratas in other areas – most notably in Saxon Switzerland. As opposed to via ferratas in the Dolomites, many routes were built in modern times and they have a sport character, and can be short and much more difficult than classics in the Dolomites.

=== Rest of Europe ===
==== Andorra ====
This small country has 15 vía ferratas.

==== Bosnia and Herzegovina ====
In 2019 Bosnia and Herzegovina got its first via ferrata on Velež.

==== Bulgaria ====
There are at least 7 vía ferratas in Bulgaria. One of the most popular was built in 2010 near Malyovitsa hut. There are also 4 via ferratas in the Rhodopes - near Smolyan, Rakitovo and Trigrad.

==== Czech Republic ====
There is a via ferrata system in the town of Děčín. It has an easy shared starting section at the end of which you can choose a number of different routes with a variety of difficulties. There is also a via ferrata in Semily called Vodní Brána (Water Gate). Another system of three via ferratas forming a closed circuit is near the village Vír and the eponymous dam.

==== Hungary ====
There are at least 4 via ferratas in Hungary.

==== Kosovo ====
There are several via ferratas in the Rugova Mountains, near Peja. The Ari via ferrata was conceived in 2012 and constructed with the collaboration of Italian and Kosovar alpine clubs. The via ferrata Berim is near Zubin Potok and is the longest and highest in the Balkans.

==== Norway ====
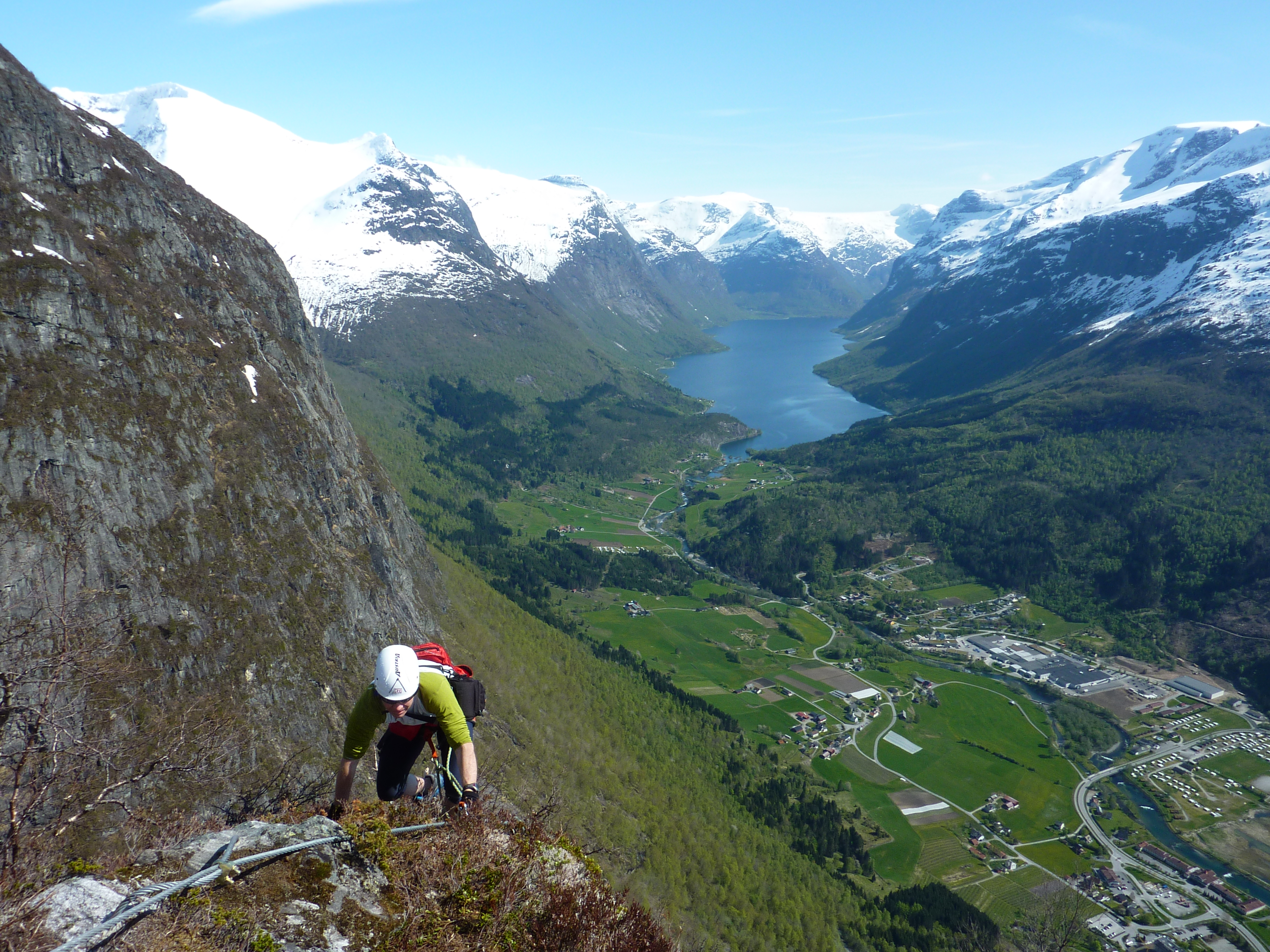
The "Via Ferrata Loen" in Stryn Municipality

Several via ferratas (15 in 2020) are found in Norway, usually named by their Norwegian word klatresti which roughly translates as 'climbing trail'. The recent years have seen the construction of several new ones - via ferratas have less of a tradition in Norway than they have in southern Europe.

There is a via ferrata Tysso in Tyssedal, starting at the Norwegian Museum of Hydro Power and Industry and climbing along the very steep hydropower pipeline. Kyrkjeveggen ("the church wall") is situated in Fjæra in the fjord of Åkrafjorden. The route of Kyrkjeveggen elevates 500 meters to the top. There is also one in Hemsedal Municipality. The most known is the Via Ferrata Loen in Stryn Municipality. It opened in 2012. This track contains the dramatic hanging bridge, Gjølmunnebrua. Trondheim Municipality boasts a via ferrata opposite the Trondheimsfjord on the Munken mountain, with views of the city. Since 2015 Straumsfjell in Setesdal is Northern Europe's longest via ferrata. The one in Lom Municipality starts at an elevation of 380 metres (1,250 ft) above sea level and it ends at an elevation of 1,524 metres (5,000 ft) above sea level, a record in Norway both in vertical metre and for the highest end point. Another via ferrata also opened in Åndalsnes in 2017.

==== Romania ====
As of 2022, there are at least twelve areas with via ferrata routes in Romania. Most routes are "sport" oriented, opened in recent years, with grades varying from A to E. There is a cluster of twenty-one routes near Peștera Muierilor, in the Baia de Fier commune, Gorj county, where the latest route was finished in December 2021. In December, 2021 Baia de Fier received the National Record for the largest cluster of Acrobatic Via Ferrata in Romania. Another cluster of five routes is called "Astragalus" (named after the Astragalus species of herbs) and can be found near Șugău River (Bicaz) – these routes were opened in Spring 2017 and are subject to a fee. The mountain rescue service in Bihor county built two routes near Vadu Crișului and one route in Pietrele Negre, near Arieșeni commune, in the Apuseni Mountains. The mountain rescue service in Harghita county built the route called "Wild Ferenc" in 2016, near Red Lake.

==== Slovakia ====
Several via ferrata routes scattered in Slovakia, with the largest concentration located in a ski and via ferrata area in Skalka, close to the town of Kremnica. Skalka has two co-located, free public sub-areas. One is called via ferrata Komin which has one E rated (60metres), one D rated, one C rated, one B rated, two A/B rated and one A rated ferratas and several boulders. Second area, Via Ferrata Land, has one F rated (45 metres), one E rated, one D rated, three B rated and one A rated ferattas. Other via ferrata routes can be found in Martinske Hole (B & C), Kysel or Liptov where is via Ferrata Dve veze (3 routes - B, C & C/D) and via Ferrata Zobor located in Nitra consisting of multiple routes ranging from A/B to D/E ratings.

==== Slovenia ====
There are many via ferrata routes or route sections in Slovenia, though there is no definite list. In the western part (Julian Alps), a few have similar wartime origins to those in the Dolomites, all the rest being in disrepair or of later construction. Routes have evolved as protection has been added to trails in the "very difficult" category – difficulty tends to be more variable and protection tends to be less continuous than purpose built via ferrata elsewhere. Notable routes are the routes up Triglav from the Vrata valley (the Prag route, the Tomisek Route, and the Bamberg way), the Kopiščar "through the window" route up Prisank and the Slovenian way up Mangart.

In 2010 the first sport via ferrata vas built near Vinska Gora, called Gonžarjeva peč, difficulty D/E. Others were added in recent years, e.g., Lisca (Cerje), difficulty B/C (top-most part D/E), Mojstrana (Grančišče), and Češka koča (Jezersko).

==== Sweden ====
There are at least seven via ferrata routes in Sweden. One on the eastern route to the peak of Kebnekaise, one in Funäsdalen, one in Kittelfjäll and four on Skuleberget in the High Coast area.

==== United Kingdom ====
In the Lake District, Honister's via ferrata is based on an old miners' track up the steep face of Fleetwith Pike.

In the Yorkshire Dales, How Stean Gorge's via ferrata was constructed in 2009 for recreational purposes and incorporates fixed beams and ladders over the river as well as rockface sections.

To the west of the village of Elie, in the county of Fife, Scotland, the Elie Chain Walk was perhaps the closest thing that Scotland had to a via ferrata until the creation of that at Kinlochleven. The Elie Chain Walk comprises eight chains along a route which follows steep sea cliffs, and typical via ferrata equipment (lanyards, helmet, harness) is never used. Reputed to have first been installed to help fishermen reach their nets, it is now maintained by the local council and was recently refurbished. It is suitable for those aged about 10 and above (with supervision); it is not recommended at high tide due to the possibility of being stranded.

In 2014 Scotland had its first Via Ferrata completed. Via Ferrata Scotland is located in Kinlochleven, near Fort William and Glencoe. This runs beside the third biggest waterfall in Scotland, The Grey Mare's Tail, it was installed and is operated by Vertical Descents.

There is also an indoor via ferrata in Kendal Climbing Wall that takes a route around the climbing areas on steel ladders and rungs.

Via Ferrata Cornwall in Halvasso, an area near Penryn and Falmouth, is situated in a quarry site and features metal rungs, ladders, suspension bridges and zip wires.

==== Portugal ====
There are many via ferrata routes in Portugal, the longest being Via Ferrata das Talhadas with a length of 2190m.

=== Rest of the world ===
==== Canada ====
There are several via ferratas in Canada, mostly privately operated. In 2002, the mountain guide François Guy Thivierge installed the first two via ferratas, with a zip line, in Canada, at the Canyon St Anne close to Québec City. In 2003, Thivierge developed 2 more via ferratas (with 2 zip lines) in Les Palissades de Charlevoix, 10 km north on 170 road from St Siméon. There is one in Arbraska Laflèche in Val-des-Monts, Quebec and a second one in Arbraska Rawdon in Rawdon, Quebec.

Western Canada has eight routes. The largest via ferrata in Canada can be found on Mt. Nimbus in the Purcell Mountains of British Columbia. One of two operated by Canadian Mountain Holidays, this via ferrata is accessible only by helicopter. British Columbia's other via ferratas are at Kicking Horse Mountain Resort near Golden, at the Sea to Sky Gondola near Squamish, and at Whistler.

Western Canada's first public via ferrata is on Mt. Stelfox in Alberta, halfway between Nordegg and the Icefield Parkway in the Rocky Mountains; the trailhead can be picked up at the parking lot on the north side of the Cline River. The climb is about 180 m (600 ft) long and takes around 2 hours to return to the parking lot. The other via ferratas in Alberta are on Mount Ernest Ross and on Mt. Norquay.

==== China ====
In recent years, China's rise of a professional Ferrata construction company, called Yuehua Junning, the company's team mostly through the Cave Union and IRATA professional training, and has its own Ferrata components production lines and R&D institutions. Its team has built more than 20 Ferratas in the Hainan, Guizhou, Sichuan, Chongqing, Henan, Shandong, Zhejiang, Jiangxi, Beijing and other places. The more famous lines are in Xiushui County, Jiangxi Province, and East Huhai Scenic Area.

Mount Hua, near Xi'an in China, has at least two short via ferrata routes. As of 2016, more than 10 ferratas have been built in China, including Beijing, Guizhou, Chongqing, Jiangxi, Yunnan, and Shanxi. Prisme through its Chinese partner Beijing Via Ferrata Development & Services Co. Ltd, built 3 ferratas in Beijing, Shanxi and Yunnan.

==== Japan ====
On Mount Hōken in the Japanese Central Alps are mid-level via ferratas. At an elevation over 2900 meters they pass over sheer drops of 300 meters. Several people have died on this route and the via ferratas can unexpectedly ice over.

==== Kenya ====
In July 2012 a via ferrata developed by the Kenyan Wildlife Services (KWS), opened on Mount Kenya, providing safe passage on the Northwest approach to Point Lenana (via Austrian Hut), as well from the south side (Shipton). Christened "Olonana", was the world's highest via ferrata, at 4,985 metres (16,355 ft).

==== Laos ====
In 2011 a via ferrata developed by Green Discovery Laos was opened as part of the Tree Top Explorer. It is an intermediate difficulty. Supported by the World Tourism Organization (UNWTO) and The International Union for the Conservation of Nature (IUCN, Netherlands) for its environment friendly approach and the involvement of local communities, the project also aims to give a boost to Laos' tourism diversification. Since its opening several other via ferratas have opened throughout Laos.

==== Malaysia ====
The via ferrata in Malaysia is located on Mount Kinabalu in Sabah. At 3,776 meters, it was verified by Guinness World Records as the highest via ferrata in the world.

==== Mexico ====
There is a recent via ferrata in Mexico located in the Huasteca Canyon 30 minutes from the city of Monterrey, the largest in Latin America. Its difficulty level is intermediate.

==== Nepal ====
"Via Ferrata Drolambau Ice Fall", also called "Sky's Way to Sagarmatha"; year of the construction 2017–2019, located in the Rolwaling valley at an elevation of 5000 to 5400 m, the first in the Himalayas and the highest in the world. This via ferrata was designed and created by Explora Nunaat International (Davide Peluzzi, Giorgio Marinelli, Marco Di Marcello, Paolo Cocco, Phurba Tenjing Sherpa, Padang Tamang) to allow the passage to the most famous Kumbu valley and to make safe the ascent to the highest refuge in the Himalayas.

==== New Zealand ====
A commercial via ferrata in Wānaka, Otago Region, is privately operated by a company called Wildwire Wanaka. The via ferrata includes a section running up a 60-metre waterfall, and is the highest waterfall via ferrata in the world.

A free public-access via ferrata was opened at the summit of Takaka Hill in the Tasman Region by Via Ferrata Aotearoa, a society set up to provide and promote via ferrata routes in New Zealand on a not-for-profit basis.

==== Oman ====
There are five routes in Oman; three are operated by the Ministry of Tourism; Jabal Shams, Wadi Bani Awf (Snake Gorge) and Bandar Khayran (Western Isle) which have been out of commission since 2012. Currently only two are operating; which are privately run by Alila Jabal Akhdar – one is level 2 and the second is level 5, that includes a suspended bridge walk (22 metres) across a cave mouth.

==== Peru ====
Located in the Sacred Valley of the Incas (2,650 meters), between Cuzco and the Ollantaytambo fortress. The via ferrata reaches a vertical height of 300 meters, including a hanging bridge at 250 meters, and has a total length of 700 meters. Private route. Intermediate level. The exit is via a 100-meter rappel.

==== United Arab Emirates ====
There is one route in the United Arab Emirates, located in the emirate of Ras Al Khaimah. The route runs along Jebel Jais and has a total length of one kilometer, with 3 zip-lines part of the route.

==== United States ====
One publication cited the "best" via ferratas in the United States to be: Waterfall Canyon, Utah; Torrent Falls, Red River Gorge, Kentucky; Nelson Rocks, West Virginia; Jackson Hole Mountain Resort, Wyoming; Telluride, Colorado; Ouray, Colorado; and Tahoe Via Ferrata, Palisades Tahoe, California. Other routes include Royal Gorge Bridge in Cañon City, Colorado; Picacho Peak in Arizona's Picacho Peak State Park; and Amangiri Resort in southern Utah. Arapahoe Basin ski resort in Colorado claimed the highest via ferrata in North America, a 1,200 ft (370 m) route to a 13,050 ft (3,980 m) peak.

== See also ==
- Alta Via 1
- Caminito del Rey
- Half_Dome#Hiking_the_Cable_Route
