= Vojmån =

River that runs through southern Lapland

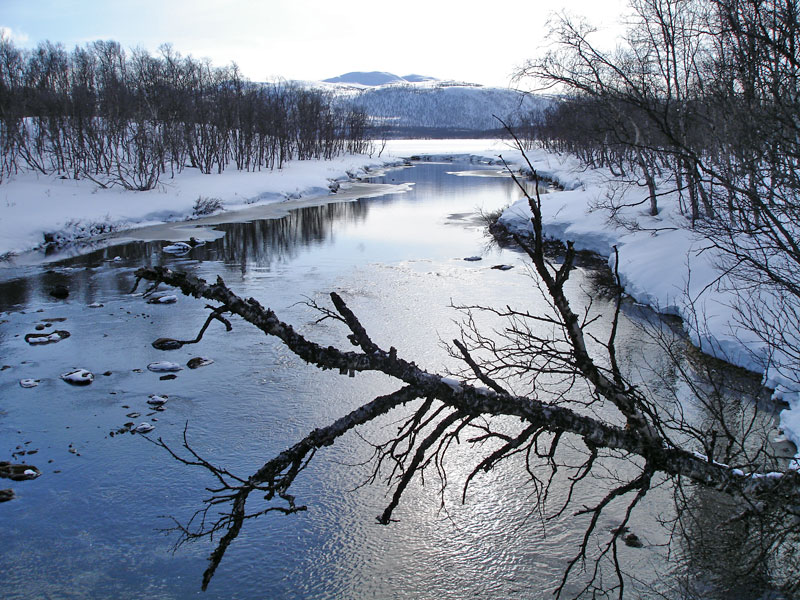
- Upper Vojmån between Aujojaure and Bleriken

Physical characteristics
- Source: Skalmodal
- Mouth: Volgsjön
  - location: Vilhelmina
  - coordinates: 64°37′25″N 16°38′39″E
  - elevation: 334 m (1,096 ft)

Vojmån is a river that runs through southern Lapland, Sweden, from the Norwegian border south of Skalmodal to Lake Volgsjön, where it flows into Vilhelmina. Volgsjön is in turn drained by the Ångermanälven river. Vojmån is 225 km long including source streams and passes the lakes Aujojaure, Bleriken, Gottern, Fiansjön, Fättjarn, Borkasjön and Vojmsjön. The catchment area is 3 543 km^{2}. Along the Vojmån, Kittelfjäll and Dikanäs are located.

The Vojmån upstream of Vojmsjön, the Upper Vojmån, is unaffected by hydropower development and is protected by section 6 of the Natural Resources Act. Lower Vojmån is affected by the fact that Vojmsjön has been regulated since 1948, but is still an appreciated fly fishing water.
