= Näsåker =

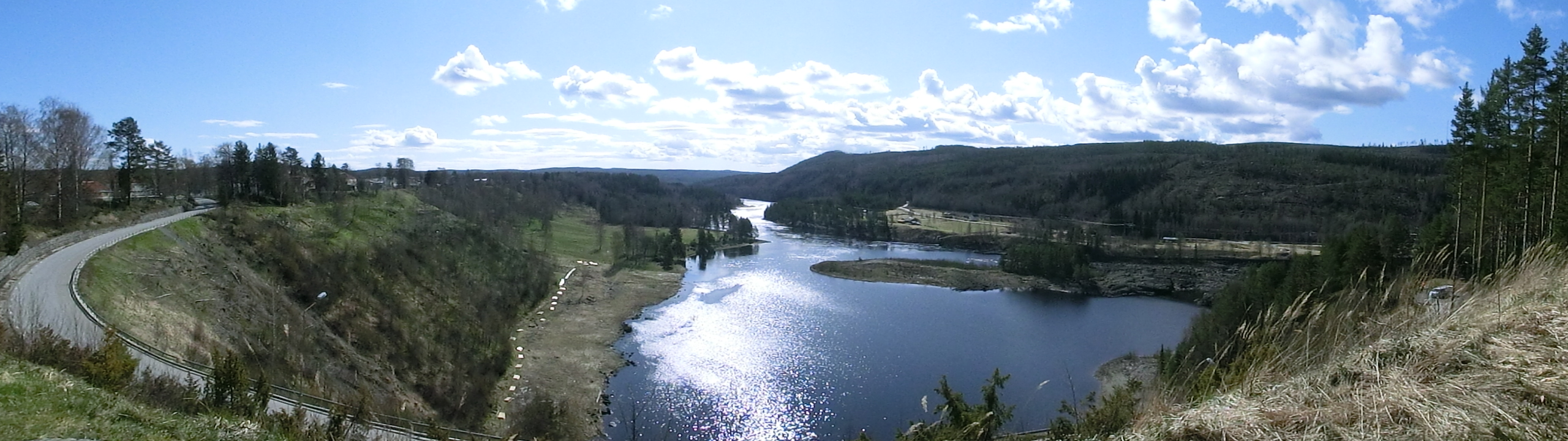

- Location within Västernorrland Location within Sweden
- Coordinates: 63°26′N 16°54′E
- Country: Sweden
- Province: Ångermanland
- County: Västernorrland County
- Municipality: Sollefteå Municipality

Area
  - Total: 0.98 km^{2} (0.38 sq mi)

Population (31 December 2010)
  - Total: 513
  - Density: 524/km^{2} (1,360/sq mi)
- Time zone: UTC+1 (CET)
  - Summer (DST): UTC+2 (CEST)

Näsåker is a locality situated in Sollefteå Municipality, Västernorrland County, Sweden with 513 inhabitants in 2010.
