= Ångerman =

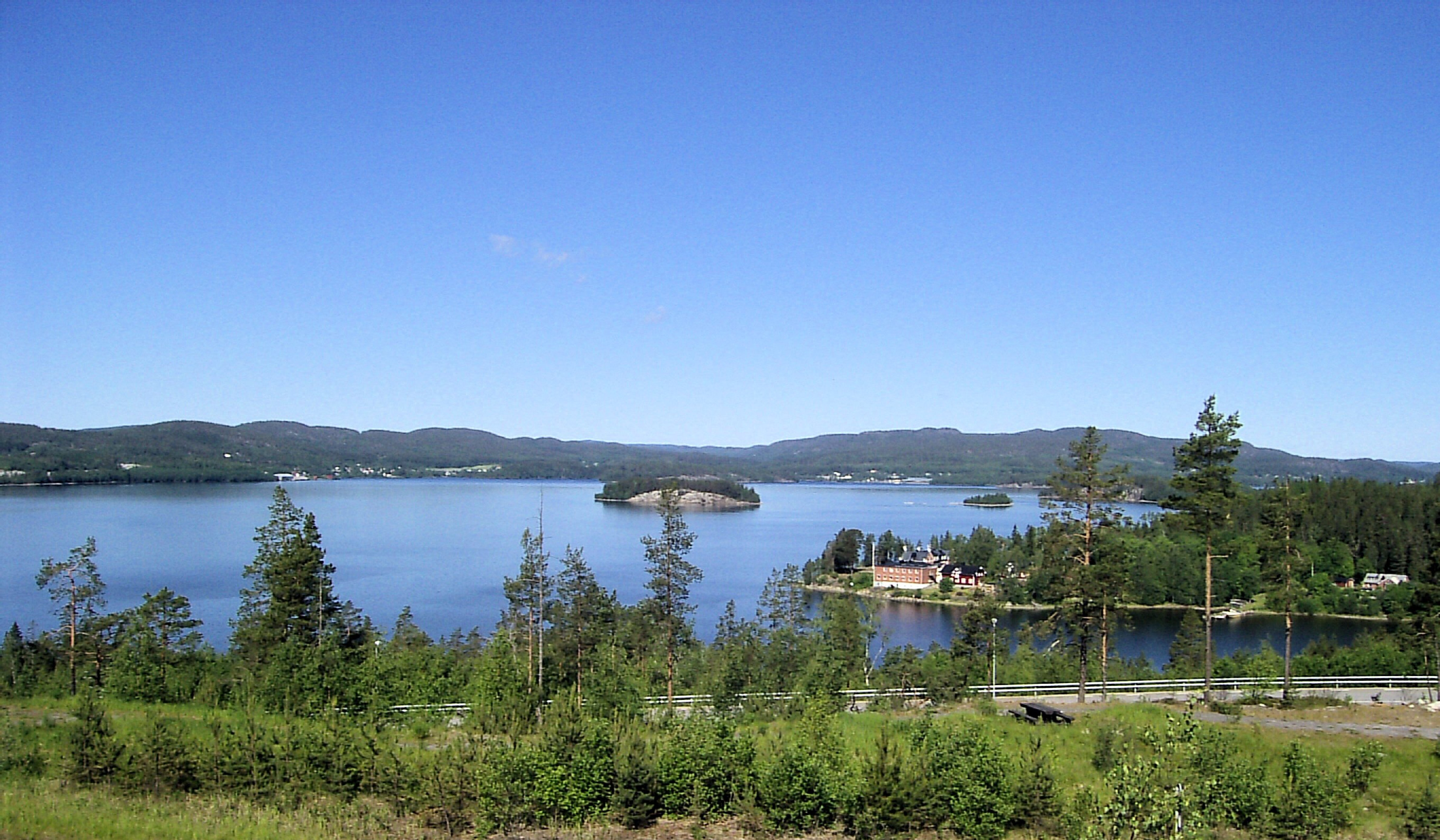
- Native name: Ångermanälven (Swedish)

Location
- Country: Sweden

Physical characteristics
- Mouth: Gulf of Bothnia
  - coordinates: 62°48′N 17°56′E
  - elevation: 0 m (0 ft)
- Length: 460 km (290 mi)
- Basin size: 31,864.0 km^{2} (12,302.8 sq mi)
- Discharge
  - average: 500 m^{3}/s (18,000 cu ft/s)

The Ångerman or Angerman (Swedish: Ångermanälven) is one of Sweden's longest rivers with a total length of 460 kilometers (290 mi). It also has the third largest flow rate, after the Göta and Lule.

== Name ==
The name was formerly written Ångermann or Angermann. The name is derived from the Old Norse anger, which means "deep fjord" and appears in placenames in Norway, and as "ånger" in placenames along the coast of Norrland.

== Elk Migration ==
Every spring, the span of the river is host to an annual northern migratory crossing by hundreds of thousands of elk known as the Great Moose Migration or Great Elk Trek. More than 95% of the country's 300,000 elk are thought to migrate each year. Since 2019, the event has been livestreamed by Sweden's national broadcaster SVT. The village of Kullberg, on the western bank of the river, is a major source of footage for the livestream's channel. As of April 2025, a Facebook group devoted to the livestream had amassed more than 77,000 members.

== Course ==
The river traces its flow from the central Scandes in the southern parts of the Swedish province of Lapland. It then trails through Jämtland, increasing in power in the province of Ångermanland. The Vojmån, Fjällsjö, and Fax are its main tributaries. It contains an internal bifurcation Vängelälven.

It is navigable for about 50 miles (80 km) from the sea. Over the last 30 kilometers (20 mi) (after the town of Sollefteå noted on the map), it flows through a scenic valley known as Ådalen. The Ångerman then empties into the Baltic Sea's Gulf of Bothnia near the town of Kramfors.

== Tributaries ==
Below is a list of the river's tributaries, named in Swedish. Higher order / source streams are denoted by (*):

- Kramforsån
  - Bodån*
  - Mjövattsån*
- Bollstaån
  - Majaån*
- Loån
  - Sjögarån*
  - Viättån*
    - Mångsån
- Gålsjöån
- Björkån
  - Oldsjöån
- Bruksån
  - Spannån*
  - Vallån*
  - Tunsjöån*
- Faxälven
- Mångmanån
  - Rötsjöån*
  - Gåsbäcken
- Vigdan
  - Skäljån
  - Jansjöån*
    - Rävsjöån*
    - Ottsjöbäcken*
- Fjällsjöälven
- Röån
  - Tarån
    - Sågbäcken
    - Valån
  - Ruskån*
  - Rinnån*
- Kvarnån
- Uman (å)
  - Bysjöån*
    - Juvanån*
      - Tågån
      - Stugusjöån*
      - Kvarnån*
- Kläppsjöbäcken
- Kortingån
- Tärnickån
  - Grossbäcken
- Gulbäcken
- Ässan
- Kultran
- Stavselån
  - Hedvattenbäcken
- Sämsjöån
- Holmträskån
- Insjöån
  - Långvattenån*
    - Mesjöån*
- Stamsjöån
  - Kvarnån
  - Lomsjöån
  - Avasjöån
    - Norrån*
    - Sörån*
- Kvällån
- Torvsjöån
- Vojmån
  - Järvsjöån
  - Bäsksjöån
  - Gråtanån
  - Matskanån
  - Skikkibäcken
  - Dajkanån
  - Dalsån
    - Skansnäsån
  - Krutån
    - Girisån*
  - Grönån
  - Tvärån
- Nästansjöån
  - Ängesbäcken*
    - Krokbäcken
  - Huvudsjöbäcken
- Laxbäcken
- Marsån
- Satsån
- Saxån
- Ransarån*
- Bodvillån
