= Faxälven =

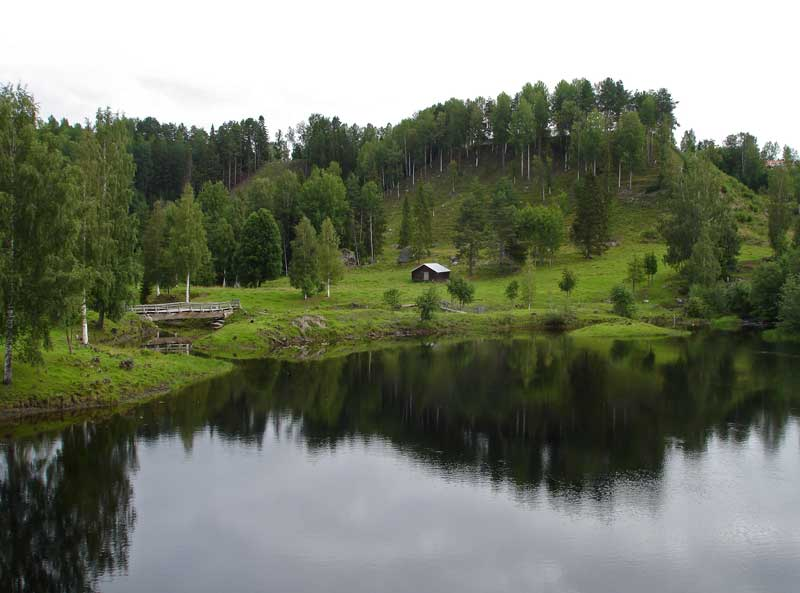

Location
- Country: Sweden

Physical characteristics
- Source: Ströms vattudal
- Mouth: Ångerman River
  - coordinates: 63°12′40″N 17°12′50″E
- Length: 340 km (210 mi)
- Discharge
  - average: 145 m^{3}/s (5,100 cu ft/s)
  - maximum: 650 m^{3}/s (23,000 cu ft/s)

Faxälven is a river in Sweden.
