= List of bridges in Sweden =

This is a list of bridges and viaducts in Sweden, including those for pedestrians and vehicular traffic.

== Major road and railway bridges ==
This table presents the structures with spans greater than 100 meters (non-exhaustive list).

	Name	Span	Length	Type	Carries Crosses	Opened	Location	Canton	Ref.
1	Höga Kusten Bridge	1,210 m (3,970 ft)	1,867 m (6,125 ft)	Suspension; Steel box girder deck, concrete pylons 310+1210+280	European route E4; Ångerman	1997	Veda och Mörtsal; 62°47′54.0″N 17°56′20.8″E	Västernorrland	
2	Øresund Bridge	490 m (1,610 ft)	7,845 m (25,738 ft)	Cable-stayed; Steel truss deck, concrete pylons 2 levels deck 141+160+490+160+141	European route E20; Øresund Line; Øresund	2000	Malmö–Copenhagen; 55°34′29.1″N 12°49′38.4″E	Skåne; Denmark	
3	Älvsborg Bridge	418 m (1,371 ft)	933 m (3,061 ft)	Suspension; Steel truss deck, concrete pylons	Road bridge Göta älv	1966	Gothenburg; 57°41′27.1″N 11°54′05.7″E	Västra Götaland	
4	Uddevalla Bridge	414 m (1,358 ft)	1,712 m (5,617 ft)	Cable-stayed; Composite steel/concrete deck, concrete pylons 179+414+179	European route E6; Sunninge sound	2000	Uddevalla; 58°19′31.8″N 11°50′40.0″E	Västra Götaland	
5	Tjörn Bridge	366 m (1,201 ft)	664 m (2,178 ft)	Cable-stayed; Steel box girder deck, concrete pylons	County road 160; Askerö Fjord	1981	Stenungsund–Tjörn Island; 58°03′33.6″N 11°46′52.6″E	Västra Götaland	
6	Almö Bridge	278 m (912 ft)	667 m (2,188 ft)	Arch; Concrete deck arch	County road 160; Askerö Fjord	1960	Stenungsund–Tjörn Island; 58°03′34.1″N 11°46′52.6″E	Västra Götaland	
7	Sandö Bridge	264 m (866 ft)	810 m (2,660 ft)	Arch; Concrete deck arch	County road 332; Ångerman	1943	Kramfors; 62°52′59.4″N 17°52′39.2″E	Västernorrland	
8	Svinesund Bridge	247 m (810 ft)	704 m (2,310 ft)	Arch; Concrete through arch, steel box girder deck	European route E6; Iddefjord	2005	Strömstad–Halden; 59°05′39.2″N 11°15′06.3″E	Västra Götaland; Norway	
9	Farsta Bridge	210 m (690 ft)	420 m (1,380 ft)	Box girder Prestressed concrete	County road 222; Farstaviken	1985	Gustavsberg; 59°19′13.1″N 18°20′50.4″E	Stockholm County	
10	Västerbron	204 m (669 ft)	600 m (2,000 ft)	Arch; Steel deck arch 204+168	Road bridge Riddarfjärden	1935	Stockholm; 59°19′28.0″N 18°01′38.0″E	Stockholm County	
11	Strömsund Bridge	182 m (597 ft)	332 m (1,089 ft)	Cable-stayed; Steel deck and pylons 75+182+75	European route E45; Ströms vattudal	1956	Strömsund; 63°51′00.2″N 15°32′51.1″E	Jämtland County	
12	Djurö Bridge	182 m (597 ft)		Arch; Concrete through arch	Road bridge Breviken	1962	Stavsnäs–Djurö; 59°17′39.0″N 18°40′04.6″E	Stockholm County	
13	Tranebergsbron	181 m (594 ft)	461 m (1,512 ft)	Arch; Concrete deck arch Three twin bridges	County road 275 Stockholm Metro; Tranebergssund	1934	Stockholm; 59°20′0.7″N 17°59′42.2″E	Stockholm County	
14	Sundsvall Bridge	170 m (560 ft)	1,420 m (4,660 ft)	Box girder Steel; 113+126+141+156+170 +156+141+126+113	European route E4; Sundsvallsfjärden	2014	Sundsvall; 62°23′18.6″N 17°20′27.3″E	Västernorrland	
15	Vätö Bridge	165 m (541 ft)		Box girder Prestressed concrete	Road bridge	1993	Vätö; 59°49′10.0″N 18°54′59.1″E	Stockholm County	
16	Igelsta Bridge	158 m (518 ft)	2,140 m (7,020 ft)	Box girder Prestressed concrete 90+158+90	Western Main Line; Södertälje Canal; European route E4	1995	Södertälje; 59°10′02.2″N 17°39′57.8″E	Stockholm County	
17	Old Svinesund Bridge	155 m (509 ft)	420 m (1,380 ft)	Arch; Concrete deck arch	Road bridge Iddefjord	1946	Strömstad–Halden; 59°05′51.5″N 11°16′14.1″E	Västra Götaland; Norway	
18	Årsta East Bridge	151 m (495 ft)	753 m (2,470 ft)	Arch; Steel through arch	Railway bridge Årstaviken	1929	Stockholm; 59°18′22.0″N 18°02′24.0″E	Stockholm County	
19	Instö Bridge	150 m (490 ft)	510 m (1,670 ft)	Box girder Prestressed concrete	County road 168	1991	Kungälv Municipality; 57°53′26.5″N 11°39′46.5″E	Västra Götaland	
20	Old Lidingöbron	140 m (460 ft)	750 m (2,460 ft)	Arch; Steel through arch	Lidingöbanan; Lilla Värtan	1925	Stockholm–Lidingö; 59°21′35.0″N 18°06′28.0″E	Stockholm County	
21	Torsö Bridge	140 m (460 ft)	940 m (3,080 ft)	Box girder Prestressed concrete	Road bridge Vänern	1994	Torsö; 58°46′50.1″N 13°51′25.6″E	Västra Götaland	
22	Alviksbron	140 m (460 ft)	400 m (1,300 ft)	Box girder Prestressed concrete	Tvärbanan Light rail Oxhålssundet	1998	Stockholm; 59°19′35.3″N 17°59′12.4″E	Stockholm County	
23	Alnö Bridge	134 m (440 ft)	1,042 m (3,419 ft)	Box girder Prestressed concrete	Road bridge Alnösundet	1964	Alnön–Sundsvall; 62°25′58.4″N 17°23′54.2″E	Västernorrland	
24	Kolbäck Bridge	130 m (430 ft)	700 m (2,300 ft)	Cable-stayed; Composite steel/concrete deck, concrete pylon	European route E4; European route E12; Ume River	2001	Umeå; 63°48′03.8″N 20°17′43.6″E	Västerbotten	
25	Öland Bridge	130 m (430 ft)	6,072 m (19,921 ft)	Box girder Prestressed concrete	County road 137; Kalmar Strait	1972	Öland–Kalmar; 56°40′25.9″N 16°25′18.9″E	Kalmar	
26	Angered Bridge	129 m (423 ft)	930 m (3,050 ft)	Box girder Prestressed concrete	Road bridge Göta älv	1979	Gothenburg; 57°47′58.3″N 12°00′49.2″E	Västra Götaland	
27	Strängnä Bridge	124 m (407 ft)	1,164 m (3,819 ft)	Box girder Prestressed concrete	Road bridge Riksväg 55; Strängnäsfjärden	1981	Strängnäs; 59°23′48.6″N 17°00′37.9″E	Södermanland	
28	Stocksund Road Bridge	122 m (400 ft)		Box girder Prestressed concrete Twin bridges	European route E18; Stocksundet	1992	Stocksund–Solna; 59°22′59.0″N 18°02′30.2″E	Stockholm County	
29	Gröndalsbron	120 m (390 ft)	460 m (1,510 ft)	Box girder Prestressed concrete Three twin bridges 70+120+70	Essingeleden motorway European route E20; Tvärbanan Light rail Essingesundet	1967; 2000	Stockholm; 59°19′06.9″N 17°59′54.4″E	Stockholm County	
30	Hammarsund Bridge	120 m (390 ft)	540 m (1,770 ft)	Box girder Prestressed concrete	Riksväg 50; Hammarsundet	1994	Hammar; 58°48′44.6″N 14°56′01.3″E	Örebro	
31	Källösund Bridge	107 m (351 ft)		Box girder Prestressed concrete	County road 160; Askerö Fjord	1959	Stenungsund–Tjörn Island; 58°03′34.5″N 11°47′27.2″E	Västra Götaland	
32	Forsmo Bridge	104 m (341 ft)	263 m (863 ft)	Arch; Steel deck arch	Main Line Through Upper Norrland; Ångerman	1912	Forsmo; 63°16′23.0″N 17°11′54.8″E	Västernorrland	
33	Essingebron	100 m (330 ft)	470 m (1,540 ft)	Box girder Prestressed concrete Three twin bridges	Essingeleden motorway European route E20; Essingedjupet	1967	Stockholm; 59°19′25.0″N 17°59′56.0″E	Stockholm County	
34	Vettershaga Bridge		168 m (551 ft)	Arch; Concrete deck arch	County road 276	1962	Vettershaga; 59°36′36.2″N 18°40′54.3″E	Stockholm County	
35	Smögen Bridge		400 m (1,300 ft)	Box girder Prestressed concrete	Road bridge Skagerrak	1970	Sotenäs–Smögen; 58°21′54.5″N 11°14′36.3″E	Västra Götaland	

== List of longest bridges in Sweden ==
Name	Length (m)	Span(m)	Type of traffic	Opened
Øresund Bridge	7 845; 5300 m in Sweden	490	Road/Railway	2000
Öland Bridge	6 072	130	Road	1972
Igelsta Bridge	2 140		Railway	1995
Sundsvall Bridge	2 109	170	Road	2014
Umeälvsbron	1 938		Railway	2010
Höga Kusten Bridge	1 867	1 210	Road	1997
Uddevalla Bridge	1 712	414	Road	2000
Vallsundsbron	1 500		Road	1998
Stallbackabron	1 392	124	Road	1981
Sannsundsbron	1 322		Road	1981
Kista bridge	≈1 200		Metro	1977
Strängnäsbron	1 164		Road	1981
Partihallsförbindelsen	≈1 150		Road	2011
Alnöbron	1 042	134	Road	1964
Ångermanälven bridge	1 035		Railway	2008
Nätraån bridge	1 014		Railway	2008
Hjulstabron	≈1000		Road	1953
Lidingöbron	997	73	Road	1971
Obbola Bridge	979		Road	1989
Nordreälvsbron	956		Road	1968
Göta älvbron	950		Road/Tramway/Bike path	1939
Älvsborg Bridge	933	418	Road/Bike path	1966
Angeredsbron	930		Road/Bike path	1978
Marieholmsbron	907		Railway/Bike path	1996
Bergnäsbron	896		Road	1954
Västra Årstabron	833		Railway/Bike path	2005
Sandö Bridge	811	264	Road	1943
Älandsfjärdenbron	785		Railway	2011
Sölvesborgsbron	760		Walk/Bike path	2012
Johanneshovsbron	756	56	Road	1984
Östra Årstabron	753	151	Railway	1929
Old Lidingöbron	750	140	Railway/Bike path	1925
Svinesund Bridge	704, about half in Sweden	247	Road	2005
Kolbäck Bridge	700	103	Road	2001
Rödöbron	677		Road	1993
Almö Bridge	667	278		1960
Tjörn Bridge	664	366	Road/Bike path	1981

== Notes and references ==
- Nicolas Janberg. "International Database for Civil and Structural Engineering". Structurae.com.
- Others references

== See also ==
- List of bridges in Stockholm
- sv:Lista över öppningsbara broar i Sverige (in Swedish) - List of moveable bridges in Sweden
- Transport in Sweden
- Rail transport in Sweden
- List of motorways in Sweden
- Geography of Sweden
