= High Coast Trail =

Hiking trail in Sweden

The High Coast Trail

The High Coast Trail (Swedish: Höga Kusten-leden) is a long-distance hiking trail in northern Sweden, passing through the High Coast World Heritage Site. The Trail is 135 km long and stretches from Hornöberget, near the High Coast Bridge, to the city of Örnsköldsvik in the north. It is one of Sweden's 12 Signature Trails.

== Route ==
The trail is divided into nine sections, each varying in length and difficulty. It reaches elevations of 250 meters above sea level, making it one of the highest coastal hiking trails in Sweden. The trail can be hiked in its entirety or in individual sections and passes through a varied landscape of forests, mountains and coastal environments.

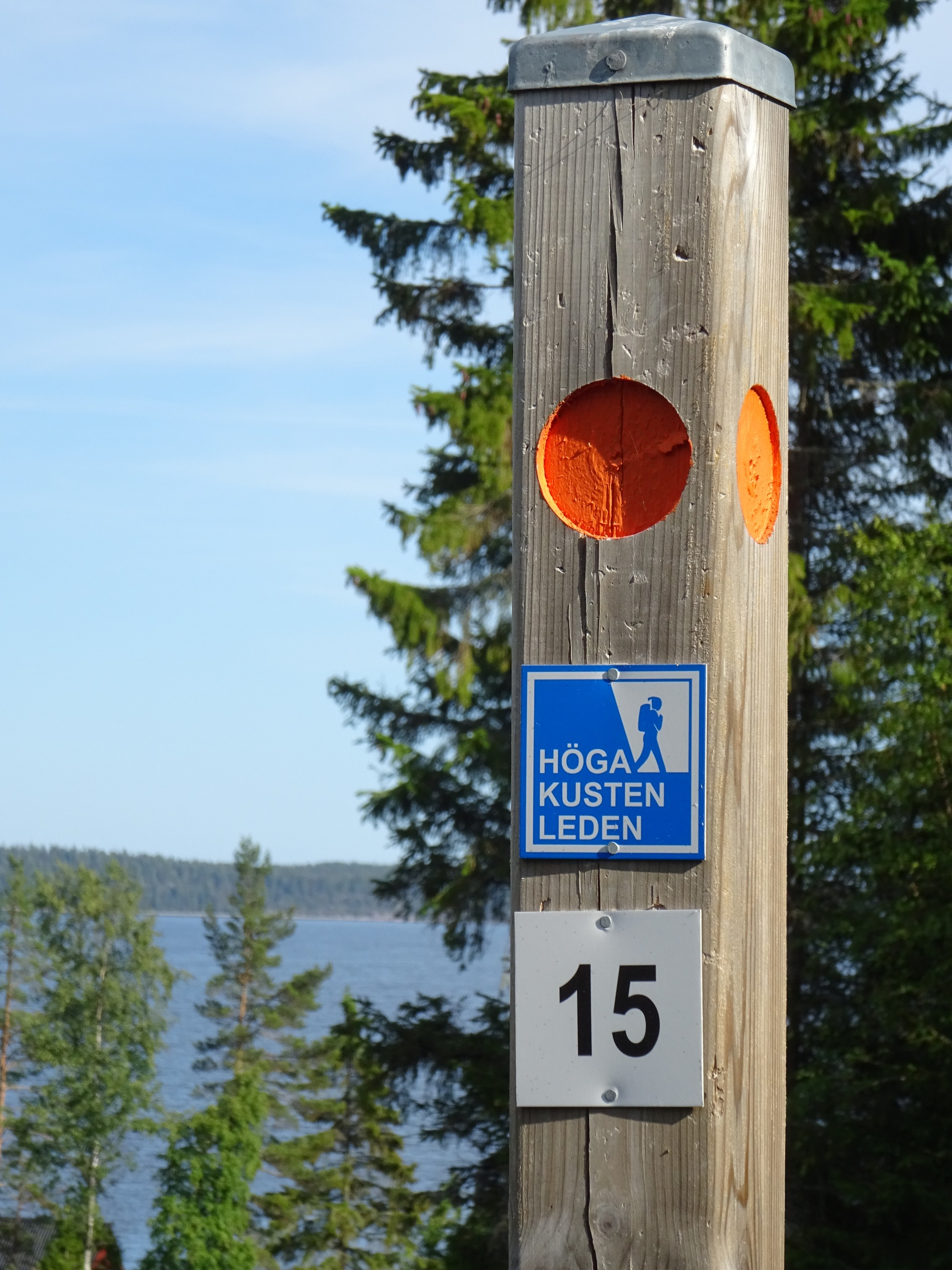
High Coast Trail markings

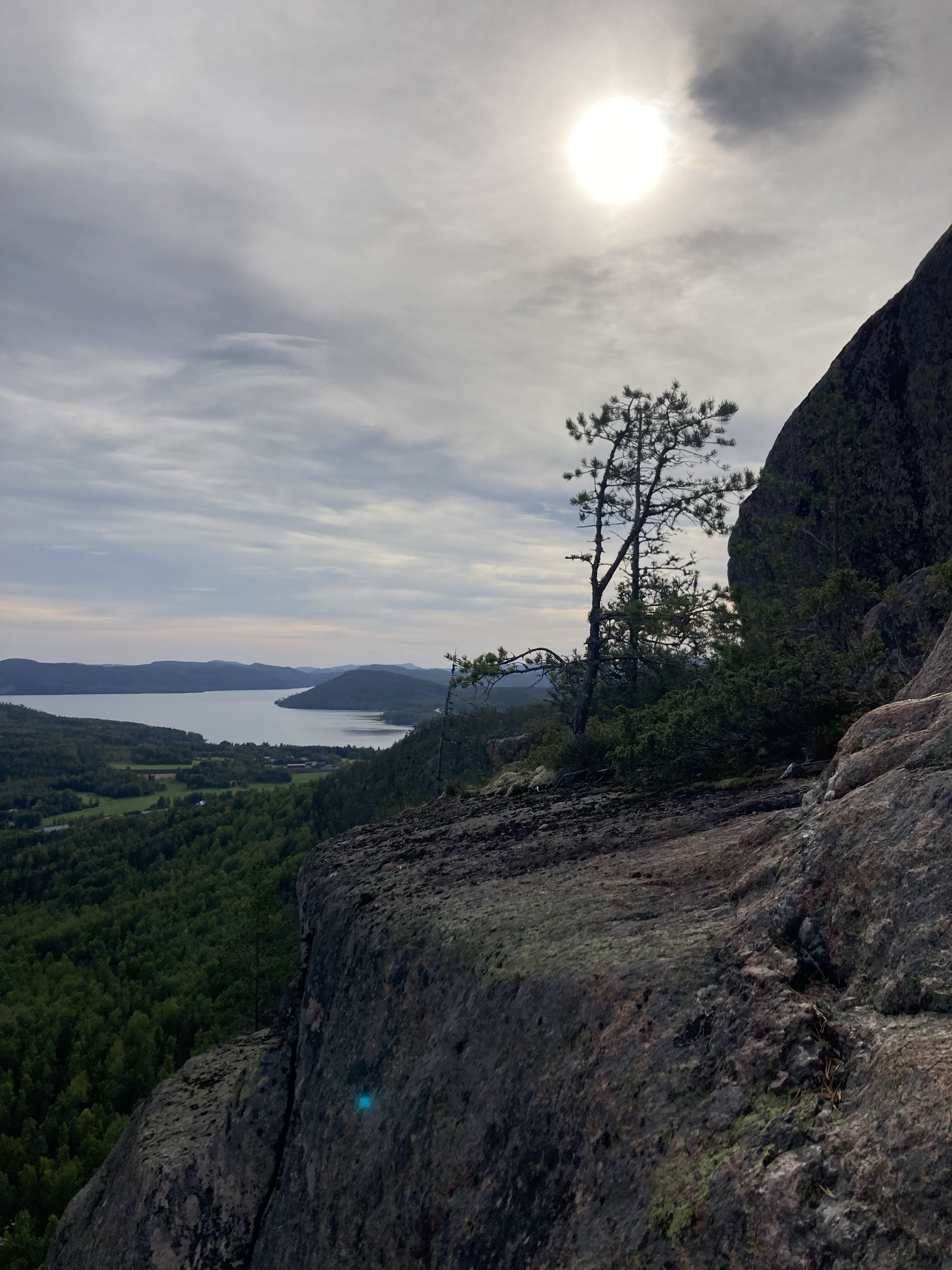
The trail in Skule forest

The route is marked with orange markings and the official High Coast Trail symbol.

== Natural features ==
The trail passes through, or offers a view of, several notable natural areas including Skuleskogen National Park, the High Coast archipelago and Balesudden Nature reserve.

Along the trail, hikers can see evidence of post-glacial rebound, a defining geological feature of the High Coast UNESCO World Heritage Site. The land continues to rise following the melting of the Fennoscandian ice sheet, which was up to 3km thick during the last ice age and heavily depressed the Earth's crust. As the ice melted, the land began to rise, a process that still continues today at a rate of approximately 8–9 mm per year.

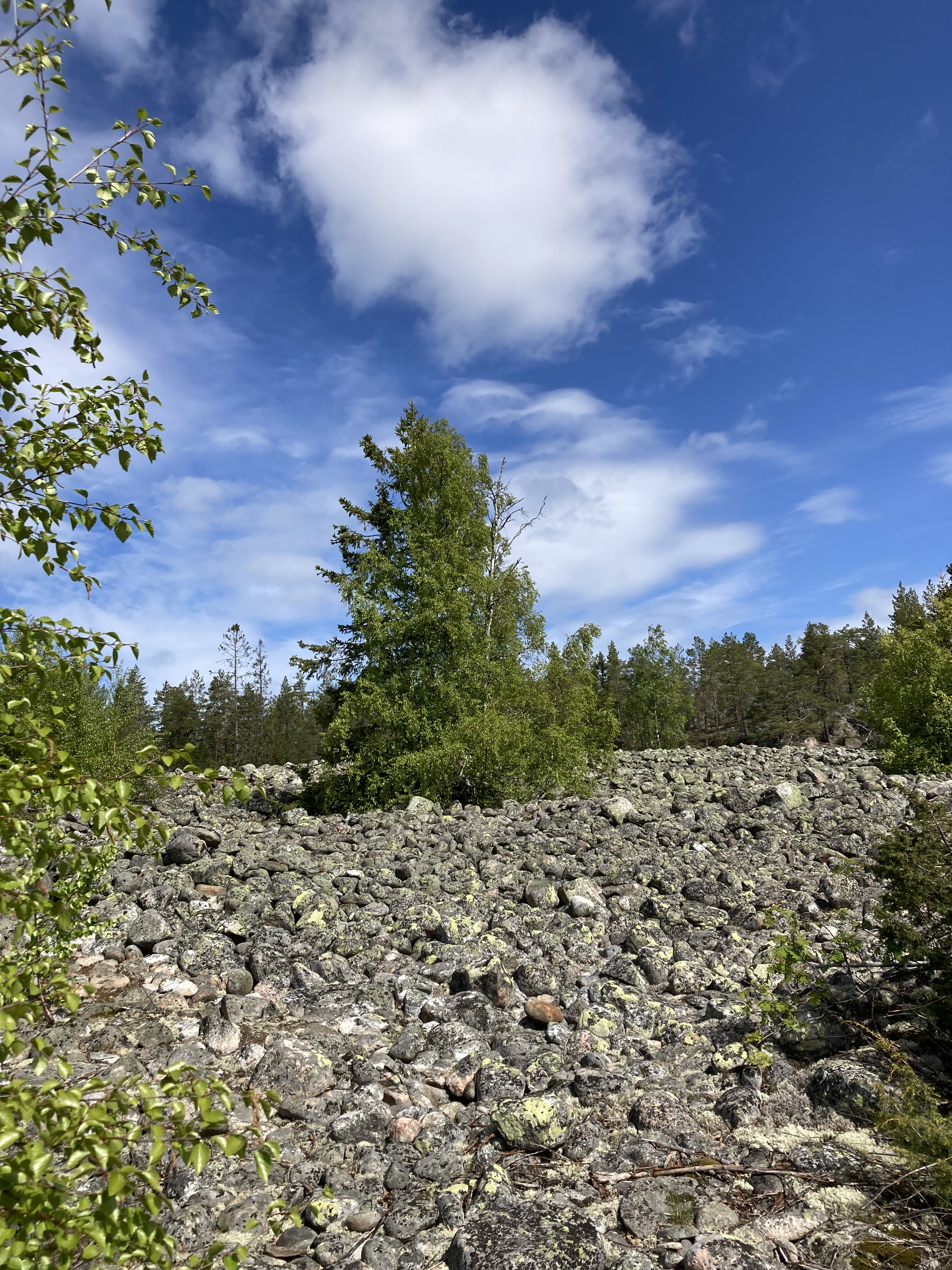
Cobble field

Cobble fields, composed of rounded stones formed by wave action and sea ice, can be found along the trail. Many of these cobble fields were former shorelines but now lie well above the current sea level.

== Activities ==
The trail is primarily used for hiking, but side trails and detours offer opportunities for other activities, such as climbing the via ferrata route on Skule Mountain. The route includes designated camping areas, cabins and other facilities to support multi-day hikes.
