= Herrskog =

Coordinates: 62°54′59″N 18°01′35″E

- Location within Västernorrland Location within Sweden
- Country: Sweden
- Province: Ångermanland
- County: Västernorrland County
- Municipality: Kramfors Municipality

Population (2020)
  - Total: 200
  - Peak population: 276 (1,975)
- Time zone: UTC+1 (CET)
  - Summer (DST): UTC+2 (CEST)

Herrskog or Skog is a locality (formerly an urban area until 2013) in Skog Parish in Kramfors Municipality, Västernorrland County, Sweden.

Herrskog is located along County Road 332 ("old E4"), approximately 15 km east of Sandö Bridge. The locality lies at the western end of Storsjön, just west of Skog Church.
