= Tjörn Bridge =

Tjörn Bridge Tjörnbron
- Tjörnbron between Tjörn and Stenungsund
- Coordinates: 58.059722°N 11.785°E
- Crosses: Askerö fjord

Characteristics
- Design: Cable-stayed Bridge
- Clearance below: 45.7 meters

History
- Constructed by: Skånska Cementgjuteriet
- Inaugurated: 9 November 1981
- Replaces: Almö Bridge

Location
- Interactive map of Tjörn Bridge

The Tjörn Bridge (Swedish: Tjörnbron) is a cable-stayed bridge which together with two smaller bridges connects Stenungsund on mainland Sweden with the island Tjörn on the western coast of the country. The length is 664 m (2,178 ft), the span width is 366 m (1,201 ft), and the height above the water is 45.7 m (150 ft).

Inaugurated in 1981, the bridge was built in record time after its predecessor, the Almö Bridge, which had been inaugurated in June 1960, collapsed after the bulk carrier MS Star Clipper collided with its span at 1:30 a.m. on 18 January 1980 in fog and darkness. Eight people died in seven vehicles that plunged into the sea before the bridge was closed.
