= Svinesund Bridge =

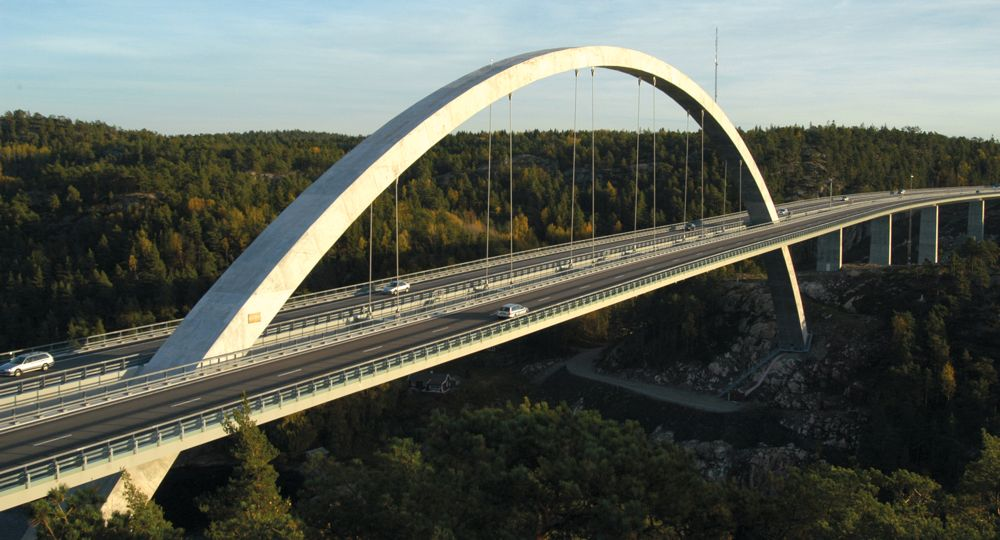
- Svinesund Bridge in October 2005
- Coordinates: 59.094497°N 11.251800°E
- Carries: Four lanes on European route E6
- Crosses: Iddefjord at Svinesund
- Locale: Swedish municipality of Strömstad, Norwegian municipality of Halden

Characteristics
- Design: Through arch bridge
- Total length: 704 m (2,310 ft)
- Width: 2 vehicular lanes in each direction
- Longest span: 247 m (810 ft)
- Clearance above: total height 92 m (302 ft) above water
- Clearance below: deck 55 m (180 ft) above water

History
- Opened: 10 June 2005

Location
- Interactive map of Svinesund Bridge

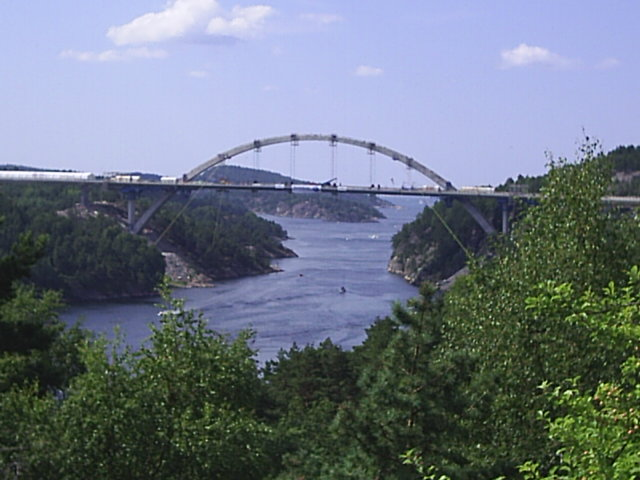
New bridge under construction in August 2004, from Norwegian side

The Svinesund Bridge (Norwegian: Svinesundsbrua, Swedish: Svinesundsbron) is a through arch bridge crossing Iddefjord at Svinesund, and joining Sweden and Norway. Svinesund is a sound separating the Swedish municipality of Strömstad from the Norwegian municipality of Halden, and thus it is the border between Norway and Sweden in this region. The bridge is the westernmost border crossing (and one of the southernmost) between the two countries and carries the European route E6 which is a major traffic route in the area, connecting Oslo and the rest of Norway with Gothenburg, Malmö, Copenhagen and the rest of Europe.

== Description of the bridge ==
The New Svinesund Bridge is a highway bridge across the Iddefjord at Svinesund. The bridge's construction cost was NOK 500 million, while the total cost of the project including approach work, customs (this is an EU border) and toll plazas, and new interchanges for E6 (with the old bridge and old E6 becoming local routes) was SEK 1,400 million. The project is a joint venture of the Swedish and Norwegian road authorities, and all costs are to be financed with tolls (some writings refer to them as "road tax") collected. Both bridges were tolled in both directions. The toll plaza stopped on 15. March 2021.

The total length of the bridge is 704 metres (2,310 feet) and consists of a substructure in ordinary reinforced concrete together with a steel box-girder superstructure. The main span of the bridge between abutments is approximately 247 metres (810 feet) and consists of a single ordinary reinforced concrete arch which carries two steel box-girder bridge decks, one on either side of the arch. The level of the top of the arch and the bridge deck are +91.7 metres (301 feet) and +61 metres (200 feet), respectively. Over the part of the bridge where the arch rises above the level of the bridge decking, the two bridge decks are joined by traverse beams positioned at 25.5 metres (84 feet) centres. The traverse beams are in turn supported by hangers to the concrete arch.

== Construction notes ==
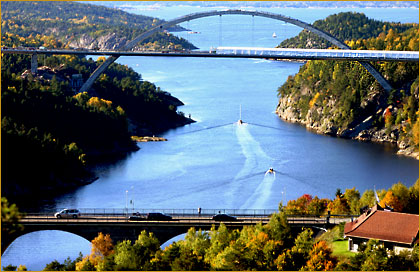
Svinesund Bridge and Old Svinesund Bridge

The bridge was constructed between 2003 and 2005 and was inaugurated on 10 June 2005, and opened for traffic on 13 June that year. Unusually for a two hinge concrete arch bridge, the arch was built using cantilever construction supported by temporary cable stays. The bridge was engineered by Bilfinger Berger, who also acted as general contractors.

The two halves of the arch were cast using similar climbing formwork, with concrete provided via a cable conveyor. The construction system had an hydraulic self climbing casting mould which was anchored to the most recently completed arch segment, and segments were added at a rate of about 1 per week (illustration showing process). Each segment used about 60 cubic meters of k70 class concrete, and there were about 50 segments per side. The arch itself is hollow, and has been provided with heating coils to keep it free from ice and snow build up as well as navigation lights and interior maintenance pathways (info taken from this PDF at the joint bridge info site).

Once the arch was in place, the stays, temporary concrete stay towers and cable conveyors were removed, and the roadway segments added. Some were added in place, but the centre roadway section under the arch was floated in on barges, as a complete section, and raised into place.

== Old Svinesund Bridge ==
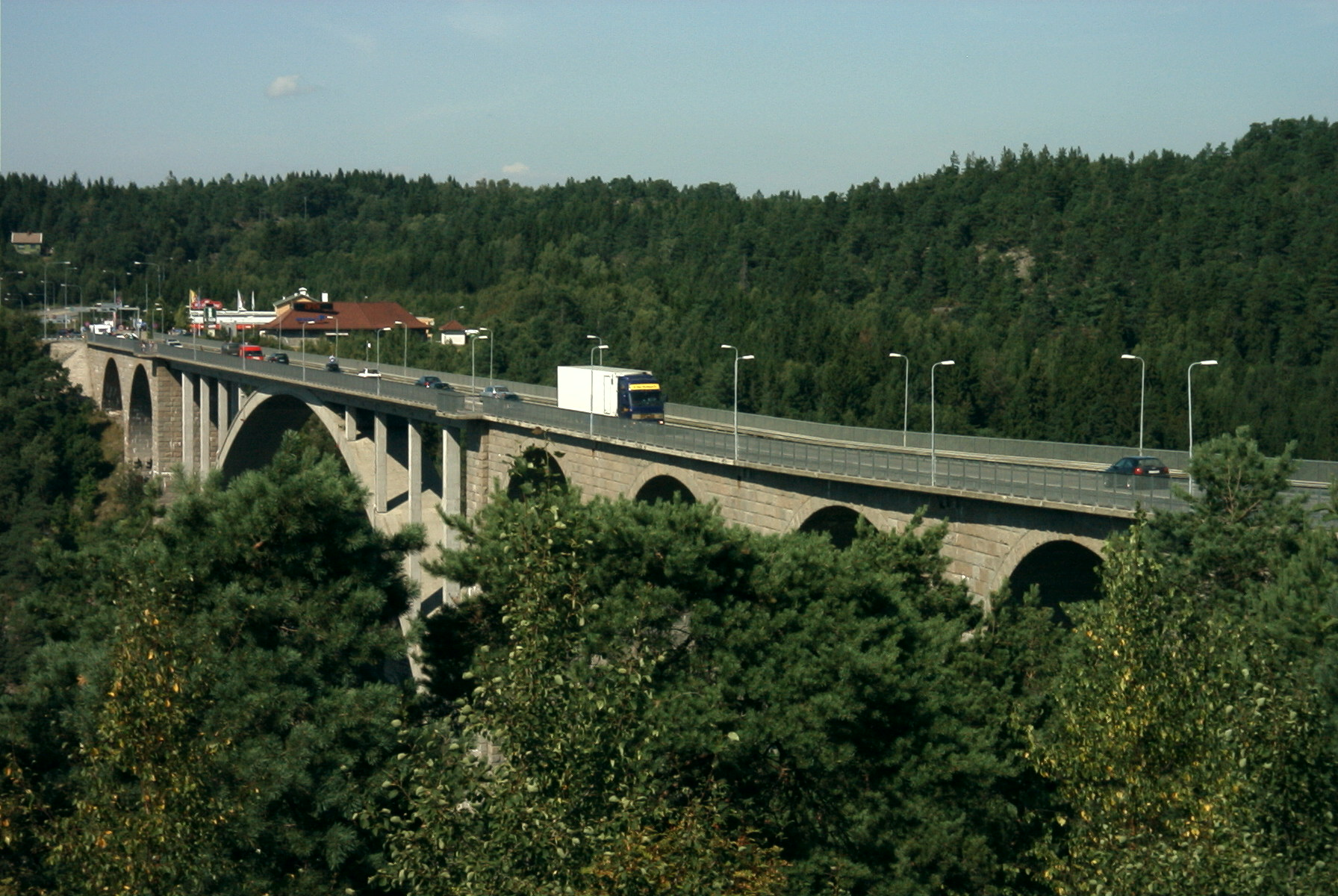
Old Svinesund Bridge in August 2003. before the opening of the new bridge, when trucks still used it.

The former Svinesund Bridge, inaugurated on 15 June 1946, 1-kilometre (0.62 mi) to the east, was renamed the Old Svinesund Bridge but is still in service as a complement to the new bridge. Heavy trucks (gross weight exceeding 3,500 kg / 7,700 lb) are no longer permitted on the old bridge now that the new one is available. A significant part of Norwegian trade in goods was carried by trucks crossing the bridge, which now travels on the new bridge.

It was built during the war period 1939–1946. It was delayed because of the war and the fact that it was partly destroyed when lightning ignited explosives (1942), which had been placed on the bridge as a defence measure in case of a German invasion of Sweden.

== See also ==
- List of international bridges
