= Svinesund =

Body of water in Norway and Sweden

Coordinates: 59°05′45″N 11°15′35″E

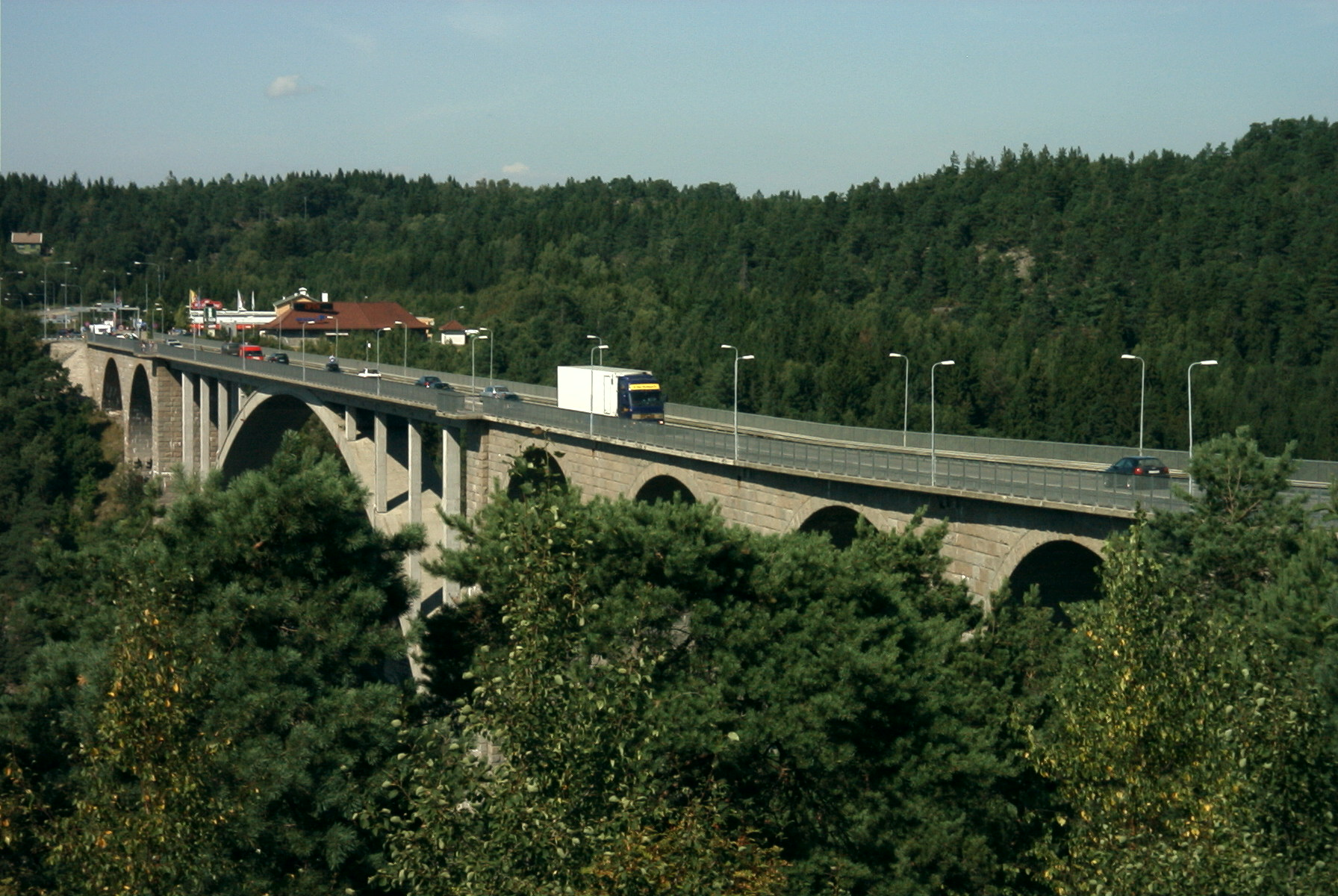
The old bridge at Svinesund, connecting Sweden and Norway, in August 2003

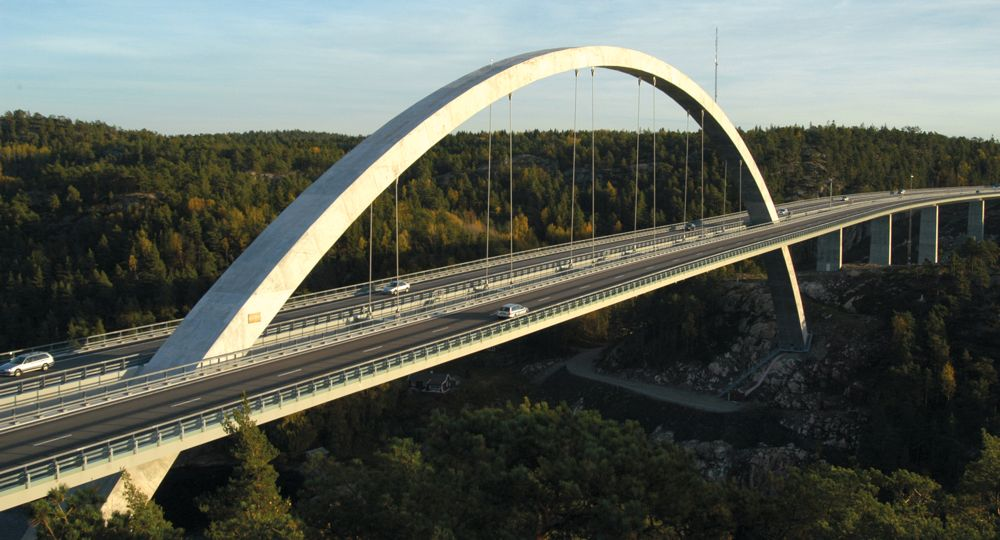
The new bridge at Svinesund, connecting Sweden and Norway, in October 2005

Svinesund is a sound separating the Swedish municipality of Strömstad in the province of Bohuslän in the county of Västra Götaland from the Norwegian municipality of Halden in the county of Østfold.

Two bridges, the old and new Svinesund Bridge, span this sound of the Iddefjord. The Swedish side is extremely popular with Norwegians who flock to buy relatively cheap goods in Sweden, where a large shopping area can be found immediately after crossing the sound. Following the inauguration of the new bridge in June 2005, both the old and new bridges were toll bridges until 2021.

Norwegian and Swedish customs authorities have offices and checkpoints on their respective sides of the sound. While there is not normally any passport control on the border, vehicles crossing are regularly stopped and searched. Norway is not in the EU so there are much stricter restrictions on the amount of goods (e.g. alcohol, cigarettes, food, etc.) that can be taken across the border without stopping to pay customs duties than between EU countries. Customs duties are paid immediately after crossing the border using the new bridge.
