= Veda och Mörtsal =

Veda
- Smaller locality
- Location within Västernorrland Location within Sweden
- Coordinates: 62°47′N 17°54′E
- Country: Sweden
- Province: Ångermanland
- County: Västernorrland County
- Municipality: Härnösand Municipality

Area
  - Total: 17 ha (42 acres)

Population (2015)
  - Total: 61
  - Density: 360/km^{2} (930/sq mi)
- Time zone: UTC+1 (CET)
  - Summer (DST): UTC+2 (CEST)
- Smaller locality code: S7915

Veda och Mörtsal is a smaller locality in Högsjö parish, Härnösand Municipality, Sweden. It had 61 inhabitants in 2015. It comprises two villages halfway between Kramfors and Härnösand. The ferry that served as transport to Nyadal, on the other side of the Ångerman River, before the Höga Kusten Bridge was built, was in Veda. The settlement lies less than 1 kilometer from Utansjö.
