= Ön, Umeå =

Quarter in Västerbotten County, Sweden

Ön
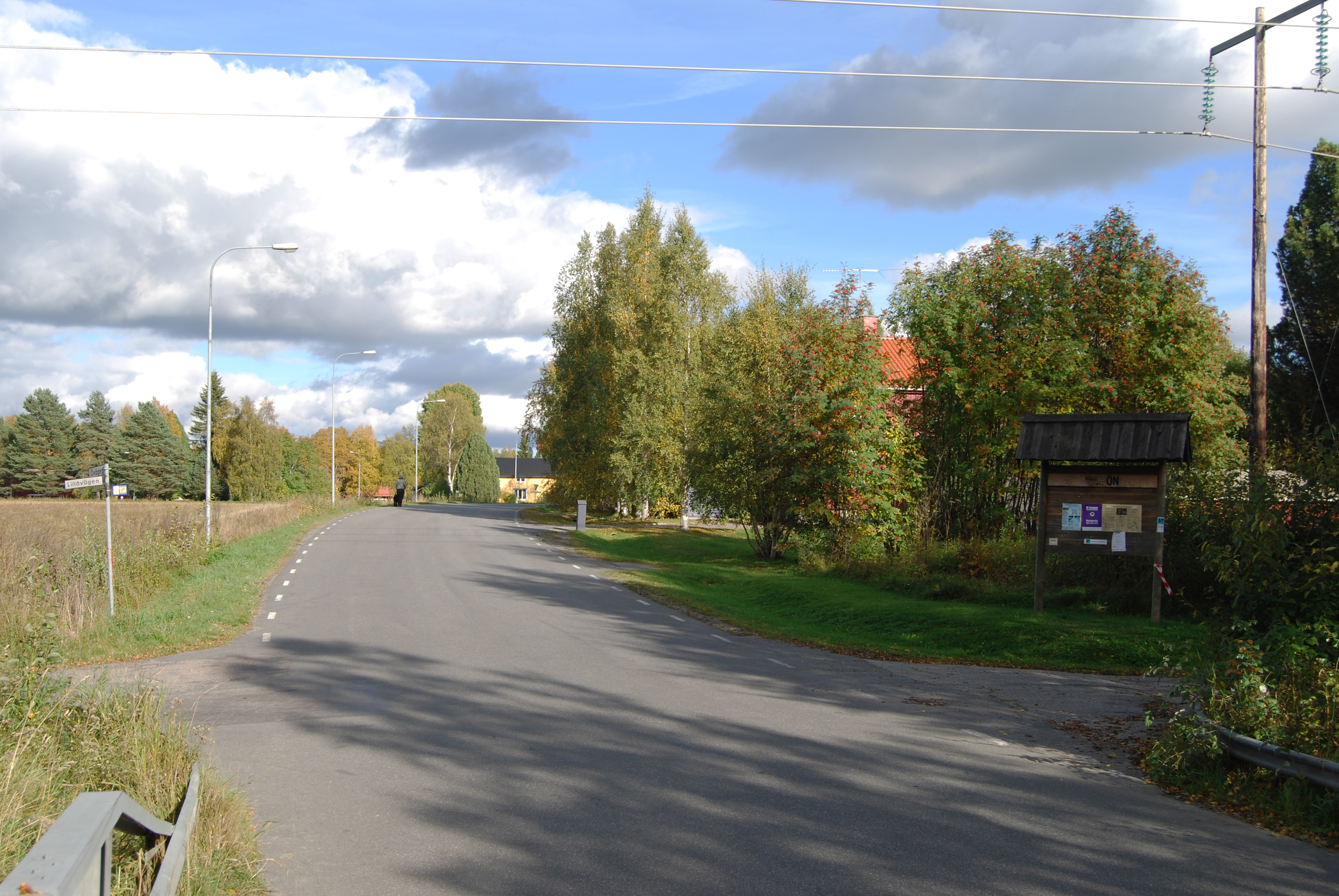
- Ön seen from the older bridge in September 2010.

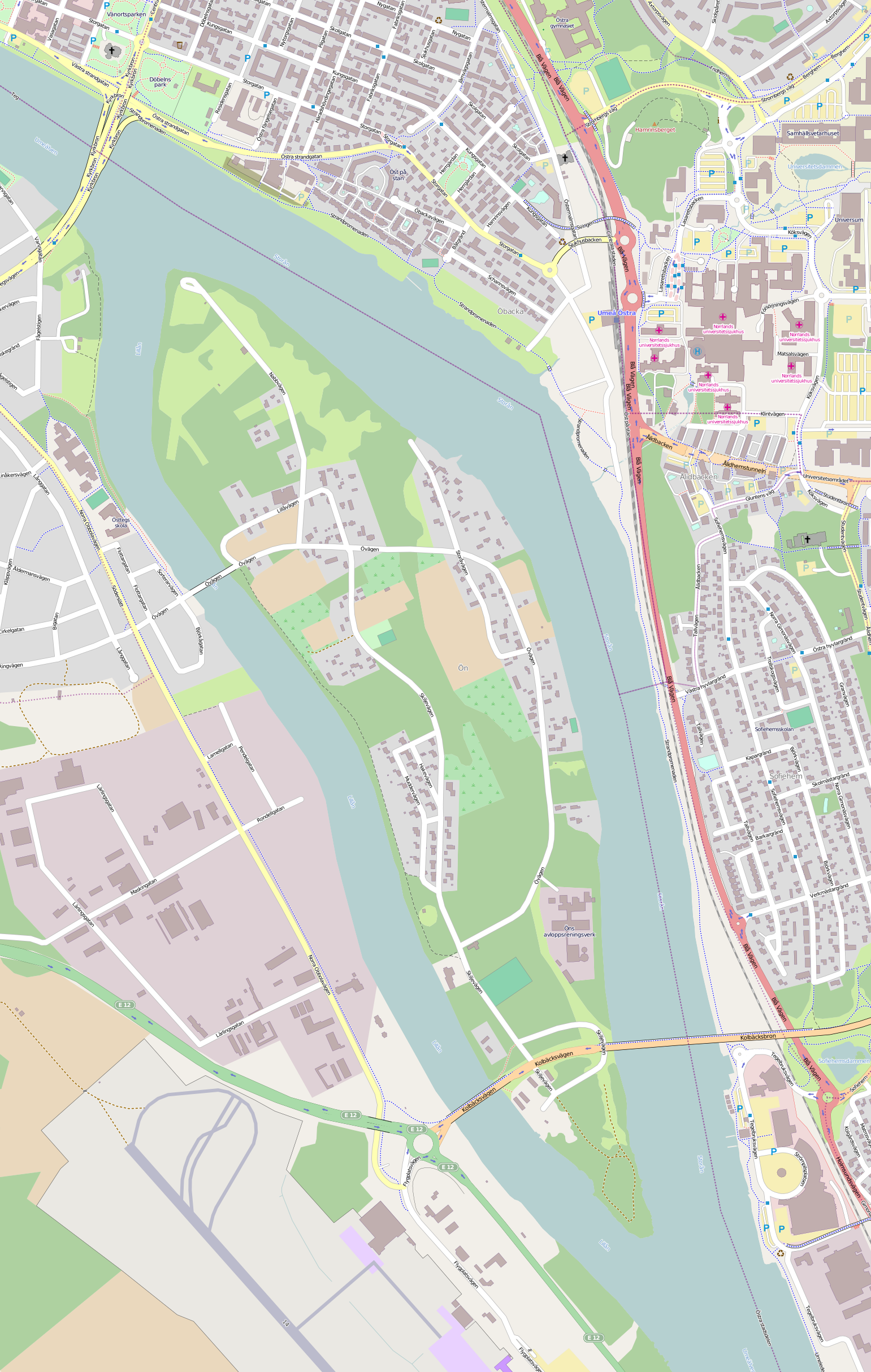
- Map of Ön, from OpenStreetMap

Geography
- Location: Ume River
- Coordinates: 63°48′30″N 20°17′10″E
- Length: 2.6 km (1.62 mi)
- Width: 0.6 km (0.37 mi)

Administration
- Sweden
- County: Västerbotten
- Municipality: Umeå

Demographics
- Population: ~280 (2005)

Ön, formerly called Öhn, is an island and district in the Ume River in Umeå, Sweden. About 280 people lived on the island in 2005.

== Geography ==
Ön is located in the Ume River in central Umeå. It is 2.6 km (1.6 mi) long, 0.6 km (0.4 mi) wide and have a shoreline of 5.8 km (3.6 mi). The part of the Ume River which is southwest of the island is called Lillån, and the northeast part is called Storån.

The island consists mostly of forest and a partially overgrown green area. It is said that there are 110 species of birds on the island.

== History ==
Like most of Umeå, buildings on the island were destroyed in the Umeå city fire in 1888.

A suspension bridge to the island was built in 1915. It was demolished in the 1970s and a new concrete bridge on the western side of the island was built during the same decade. The 700 meter long Kolbäck Bridge, which connects to mainland on both sides of the island, was built between 1998 and 2001. The island had about 100 households and 280 residents in 2005.

A sewage treatment plant was built on the island in 1972. It has subsequently been extended several times, and is the largest of the 18 sewage treatment plants in the Umeå Municipality.

On 21 December 2008, the municipal assembly adopted a plan for a large-scale housing construction. A total of 3,600 apartments will be built on the island. They will be built in several stages and the entire project is expected to take at least 20 years to complete.

== Gallery ==
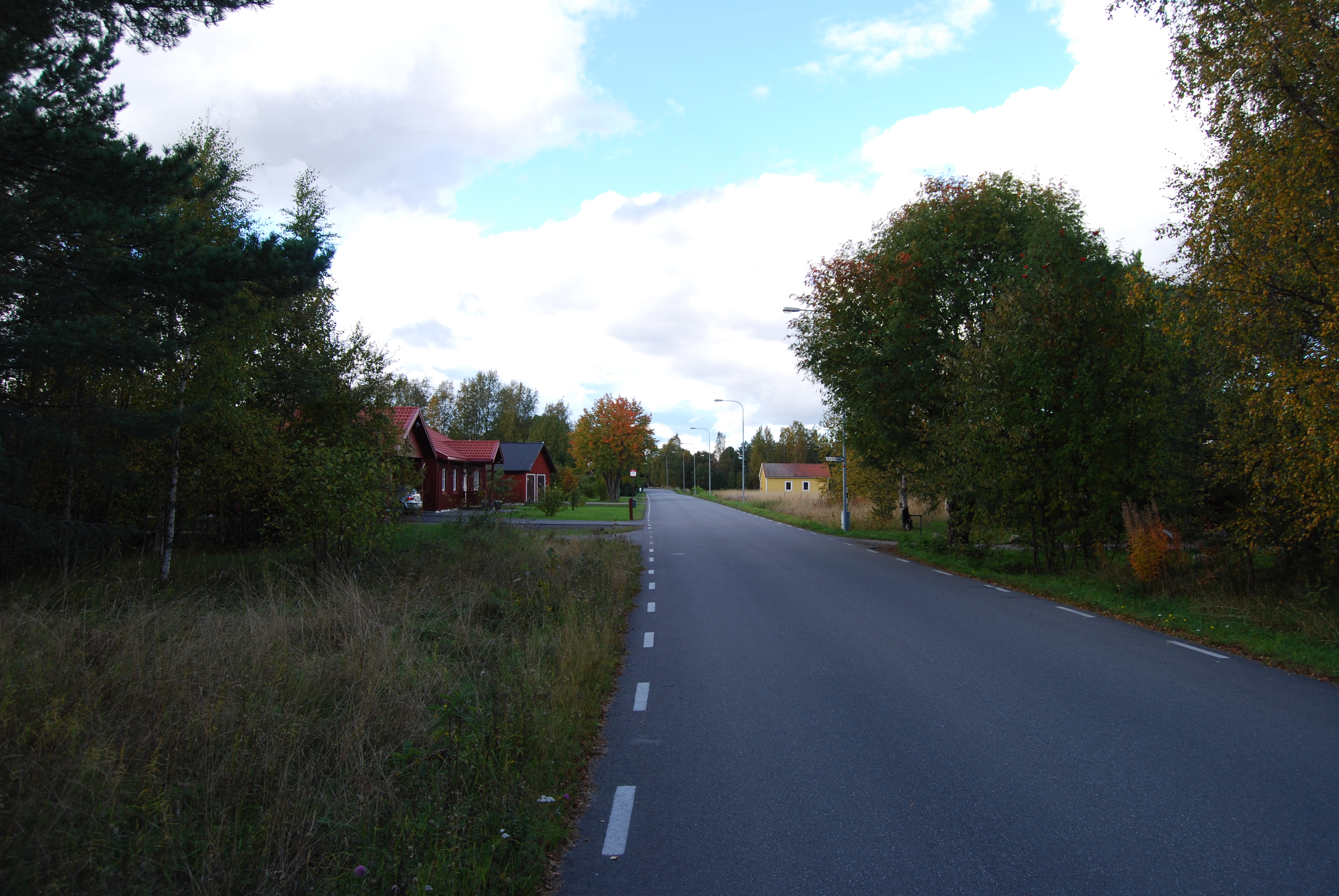
The street Övägen

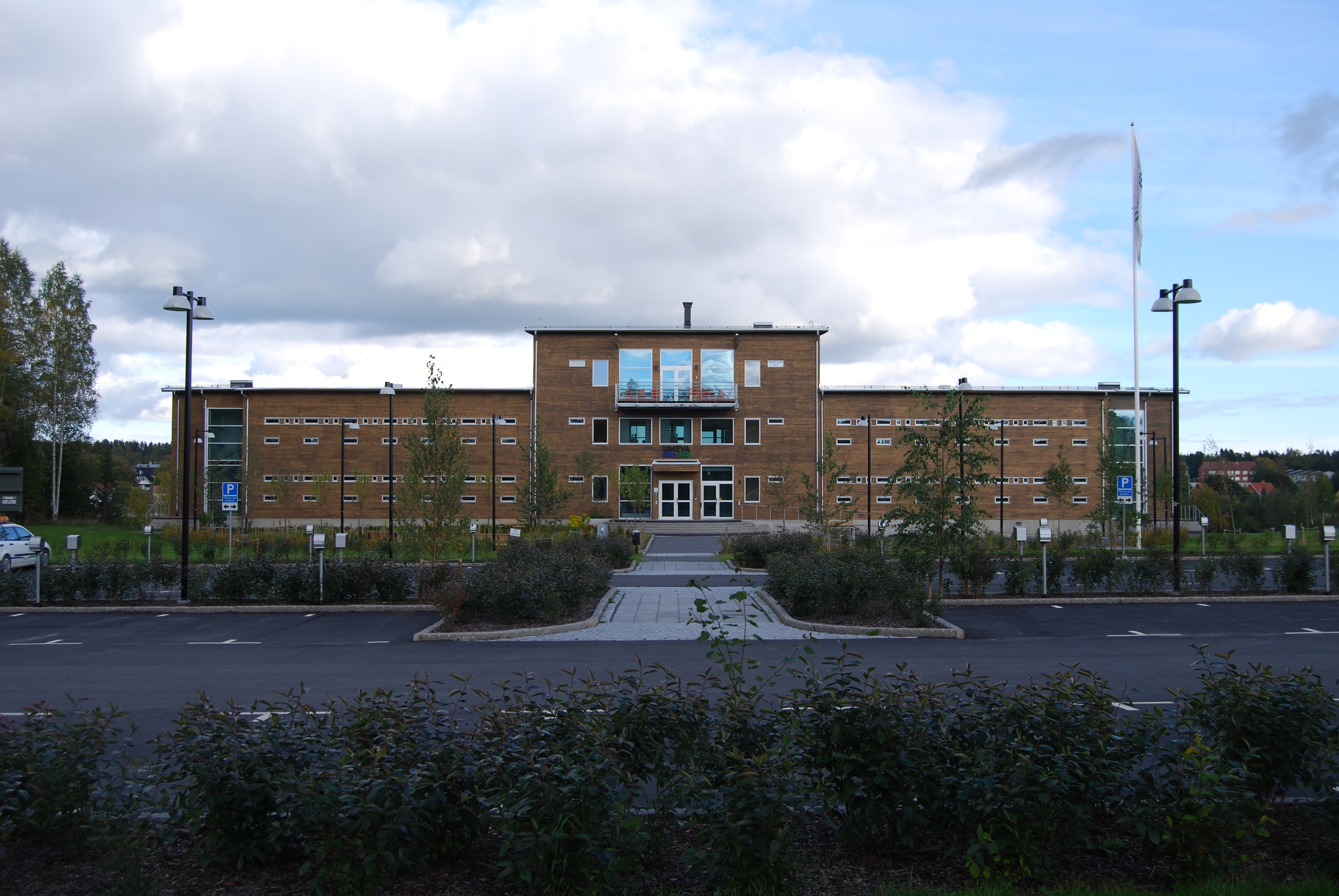
The sewage treatment plant (UMEVA)

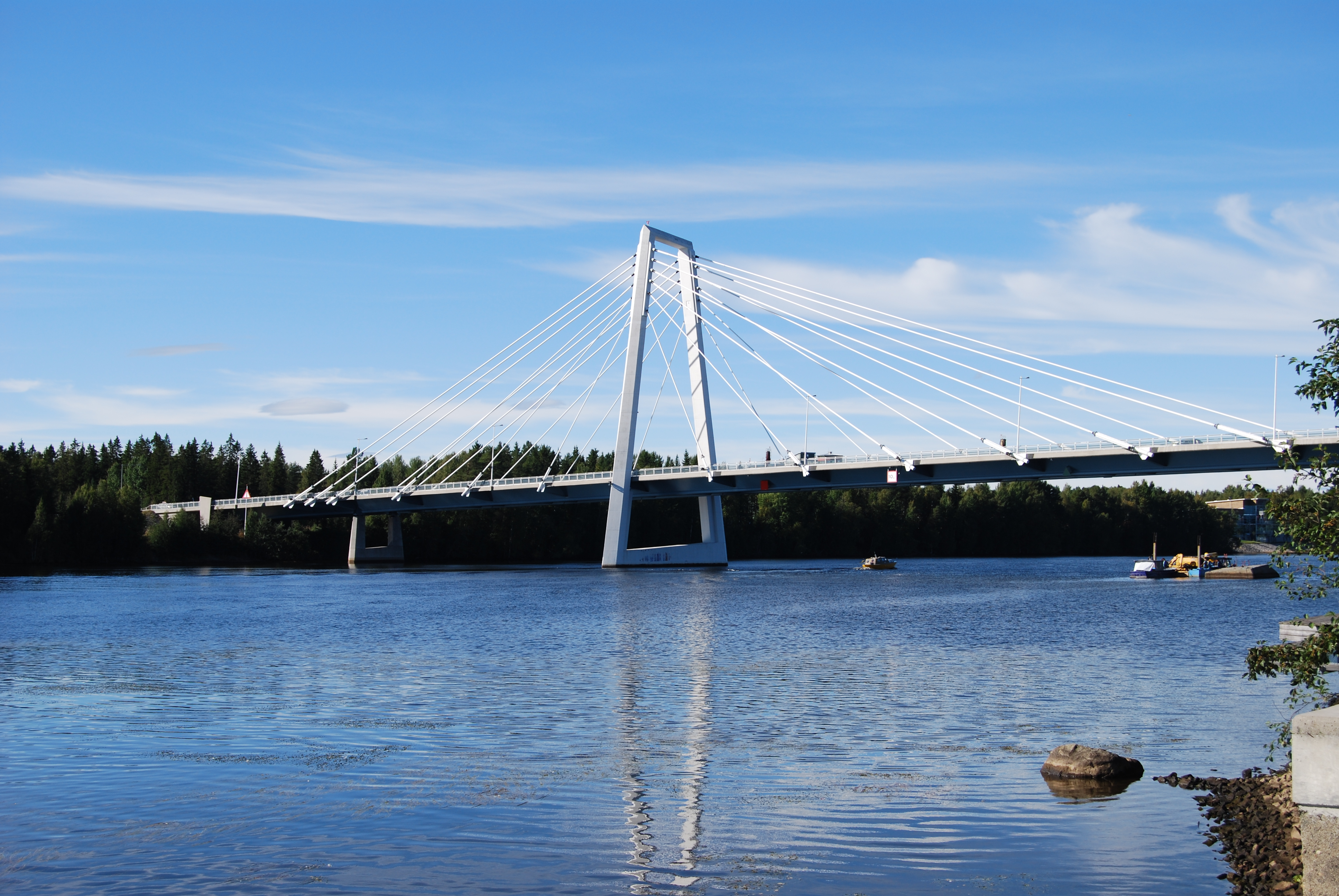
The Kolbäck Bridge
