= Utansjö =

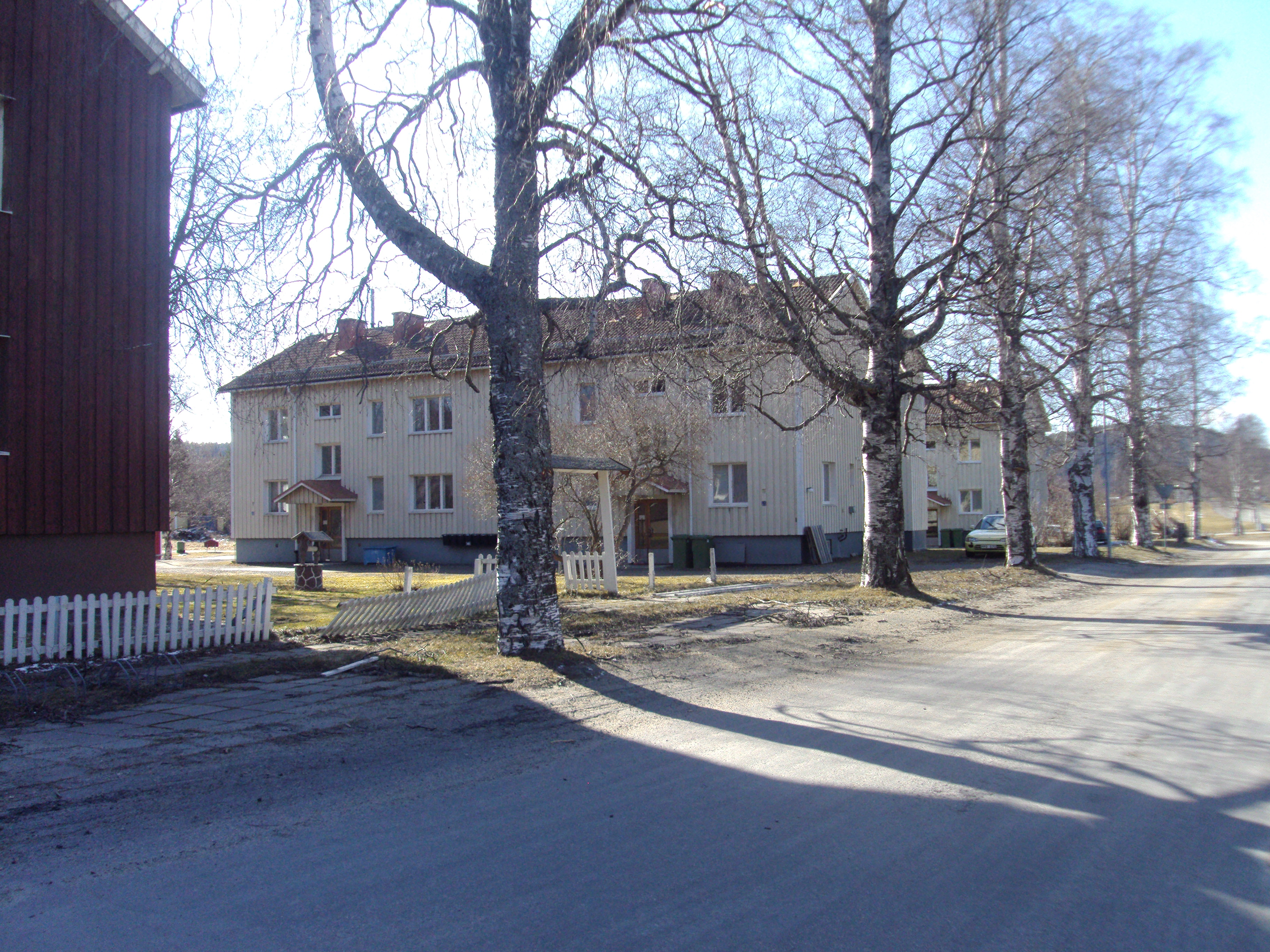
- Utansjö in April 2012

- Location within Västernorrland Location within Sweden
- Coordinates: 62°47′N 17°56′E
- Country: Sweden
- Province: Ångermanland
- County: Västernorrland County
- Municipality: Härnösand Municipality

Area
  - Total: 1.01 km^{2} (0.39 sq mi)

Population (31 December 2010)
  - Total: 209
  - Density: 207/km^{2} (540/sq mi)
- Time zone: UTC+1 (CET)
  - Summer (DST): UTC+2 (CEST)
- Climate: Dfc

Utansjö is a settlement in Härnösand Municipality, Västernorrland County, Sweden. Until 2015, it was classified by Statistics Sweden as a locality (tätort), with 209 inhabitants in 2010. Since 2015, it is regarded as two smaller localities (småorter), with 92 and 112 inhabitants each in 2015. It is located close to the Höga Kusten Bridge.
