= Nätraån =

Coordinates: 63°11′N 18°32′E

Location
- Country: Sweden
- County: Västernorrland

Physical characteristics
- Length: 100 km (62 mi)
- Basin size: 1,024.4 km^{2} (395.5 sq mi)

Nätraån is a river in Sweden.
