= High Coast =

Coastal area in Sweden

UNESCO World Heritage Site
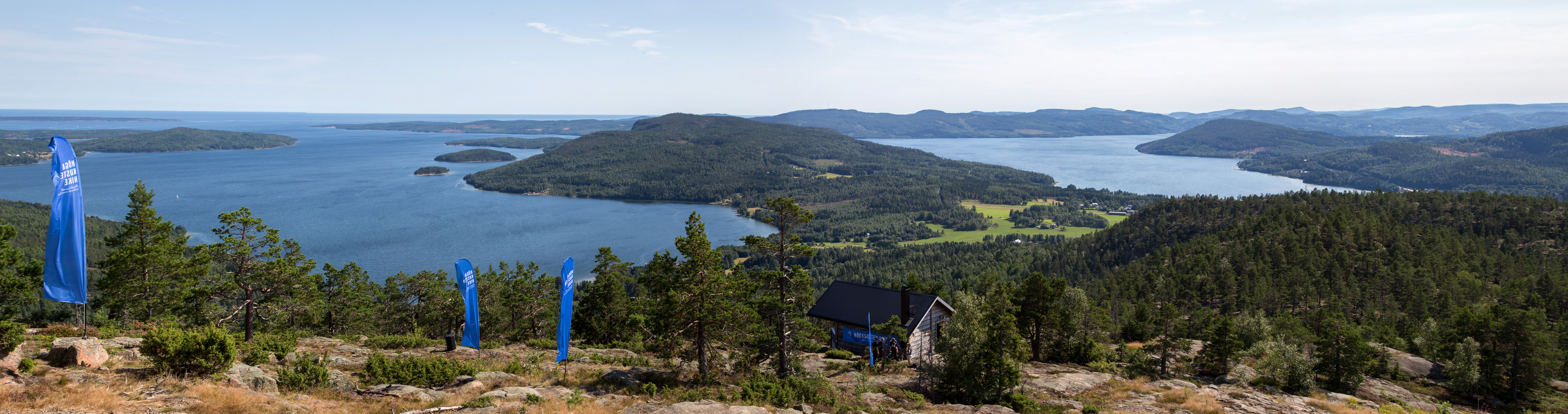
- View over the High Coast from the top of the Skule Mountain in August 2013

- Location within Sweden
- Location: Västernorrland County, Sweden
- Part of: High Coast / Kvarken Archipelago
- Criteria: Natural: (viii)
- Reference: 898bis-001
- Inscription: 2000 (24th Session)
- Extensions: 2006
- Area: 142,500 ha (352,000 acres)
- Coordinates: 63°0′N 18°30′E

The High Coast (Swedish: Höga Kusten) is a part of the coast of Sweden on the Gulf of Bothnia, in the Ångermanland province of northeast Sweden, centered in the area of the municipalities of Kramfors, Härnösand and Örnsköldsvik. It is notable as an area for research on post-glacial rebound and eustacy, in which the land rises as the covering glaciers melt, a phenomenon first recognised and studied there. Since the last ice age, the land has risen 300 meters, which accounts for the region's unusually tall cliffs. The High Coast and the Finnish Kvarken constitute the Swedish/Finnish High Coast/Kvarken Archipelago UNESCO World Heritage Site because of its exceptional geology and unique example of isostatic rebound.

== Geology ==
The relief of the High Coast is that of a large-scale joint valley terrain that dissects uplifted remnants of the Sub-Cambrian peneplain.

During the Ice Ages of the past 2-3 million years, the High Coast was repeatedly covered by continental ice sheet, including the Fennoscandian ice sheet until roughly 9600 years ago. When the glaciers retreated from the High Coast, the ground, which had been compacted by the weight of the ice sheet, went through rapid uplift, a process known as isostatic rebound. This rebound caused an uplift of roughly 285 meters, the highest known isostatic rebound on Earth. The region is still rising, on the order of 8 mm per year. Remains of the former shorelines can be seen along the High Coast.

Some of the fish species found in the High Coast are relict species from the most recent ice age, including the Fourhorn sculpin. Other animal species resident to the high coast include brown bears, lynx, and moose.

== History ==
The area known today as Höga Kusten has historically been known as the Ångermanland Coast. In 1974, the term High Coast (Swedish: Höga Kusten) was coined in connection with a report on the area.

In 2000, UNESCO put the area on the World Heritage List:

"The High Coast site affords outstanding opportunities for the understanding of the important processes that formed the glaciated and land uplift areas of the Earth's surface."

In 2006, the High Coast was joined with the Finnish Kvarken areas. The World Heritage Site ranges from the High Coast Bridge (Swedish: Högakustenbron) in the South to Skagsudde in the North.

== Recreation ==
The High Coast Trail (Swedish: Höga Kusten-leden) is a long-distance hiking trail stretching approximately 135 km through the High Coast World Heritage Site, from the High Coast Bridge in the south to Örnsköldsvik in the north.

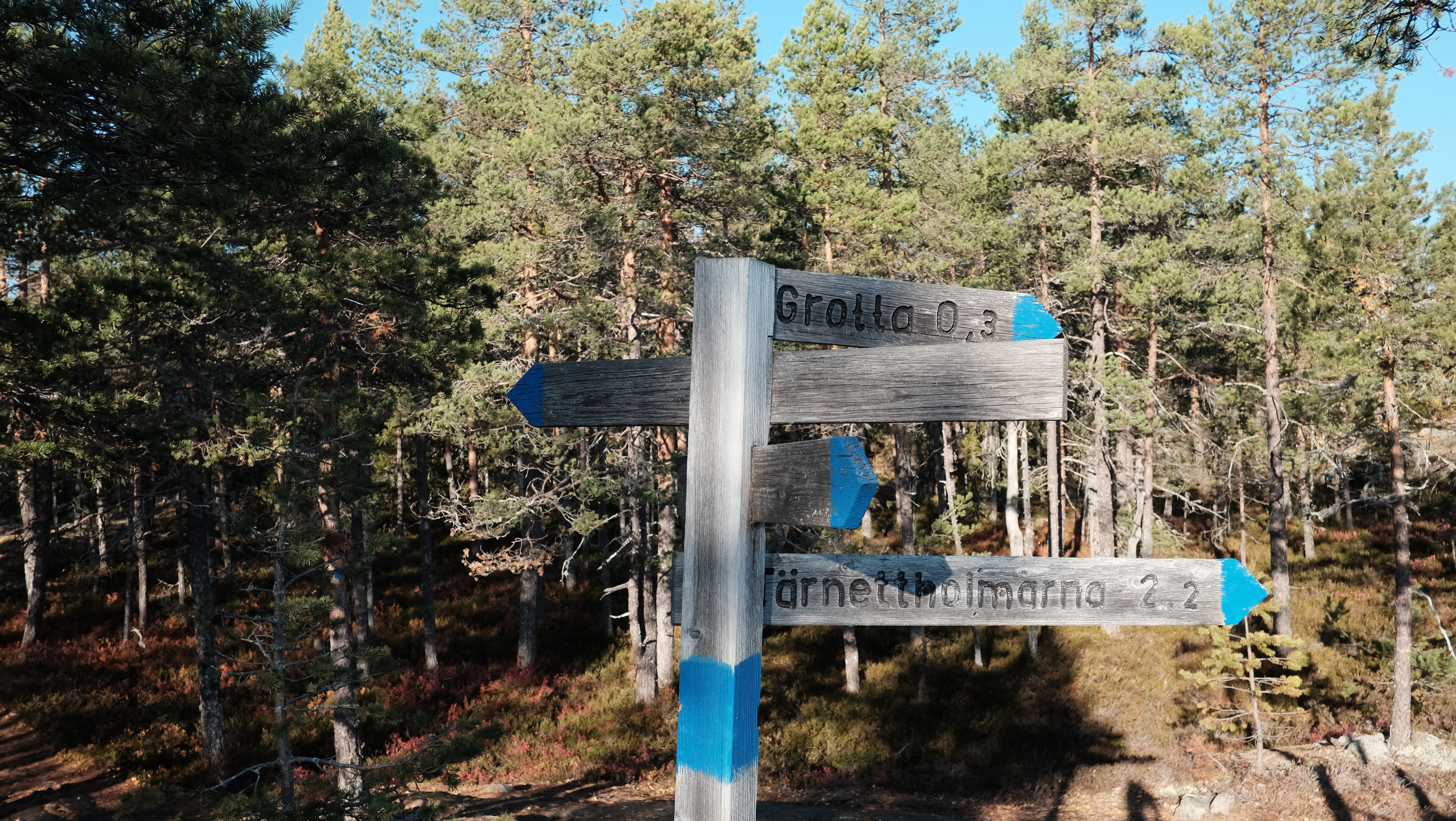
Sign along the High Coast Trail

The trail is divided into nine sections and passes through a diverse landscape with elevations reaching up to 250 meters above sea level. Sections of the trail are accessible by car and public transport and it can be hiked in its entirety or in individual sections.

== See also ==
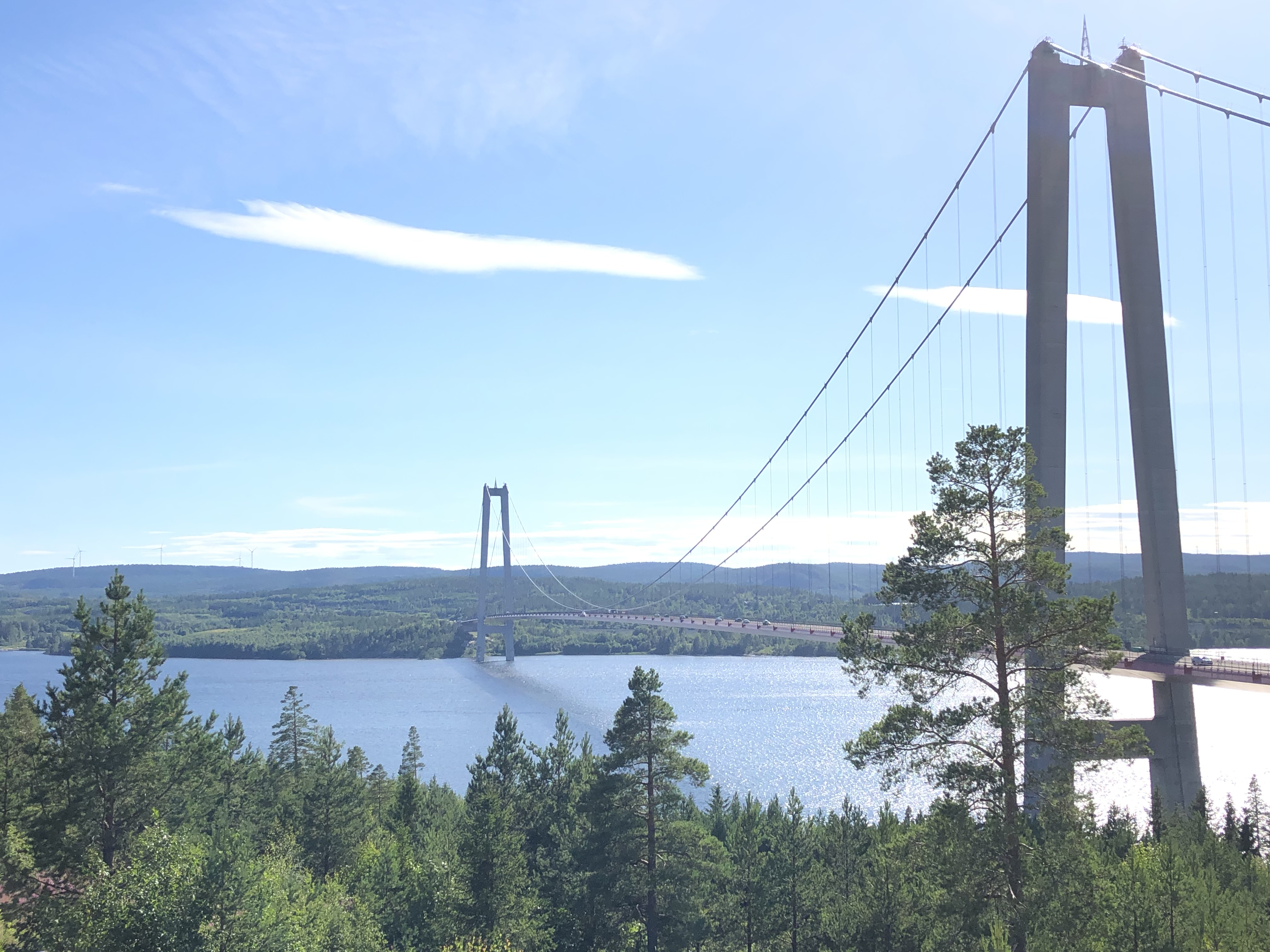
High Coast Bridge crossing the Ångermanälven river

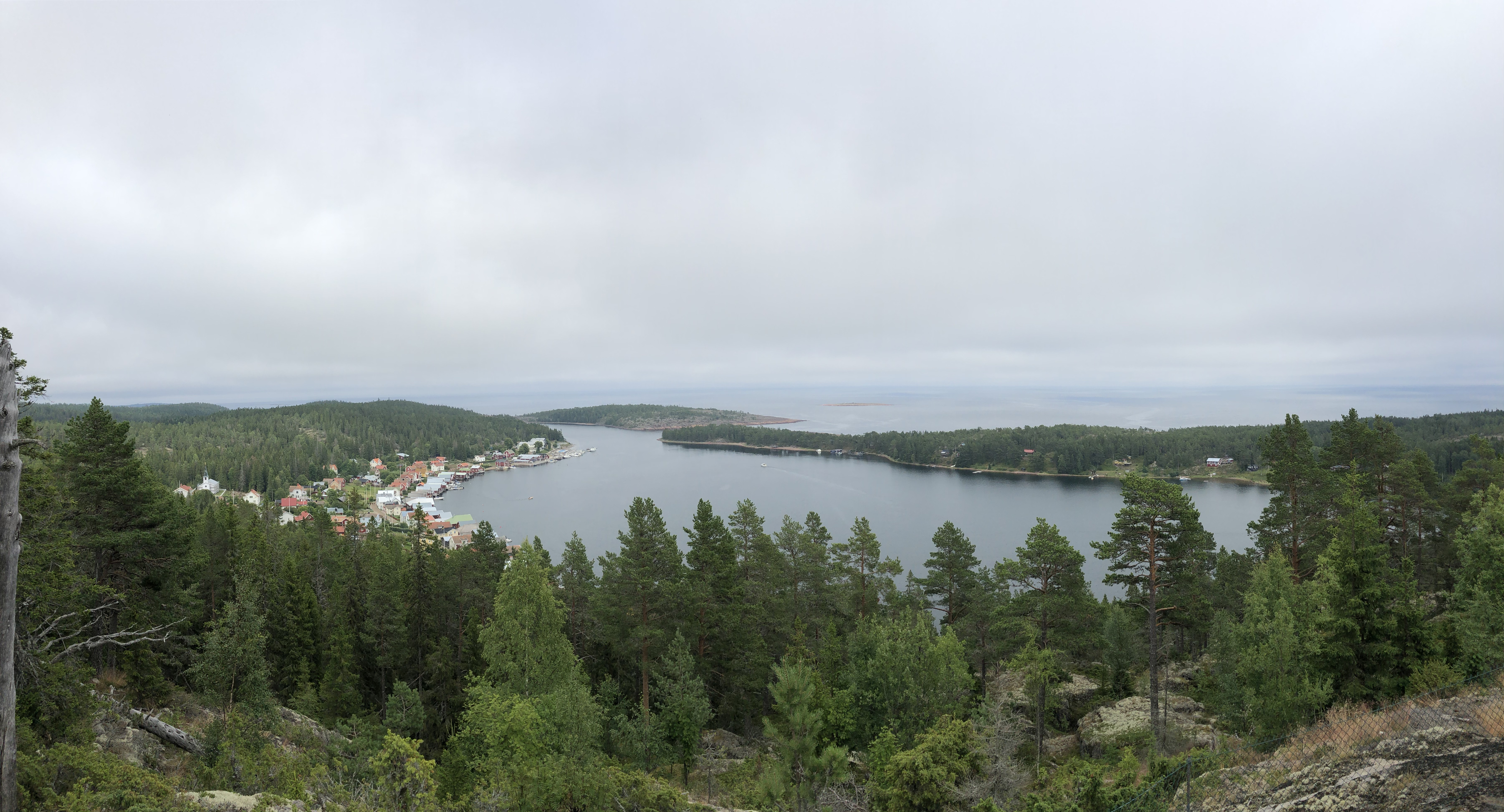
View over Ulvön bay from Lotsberget

- Skuleskogen National Park
- Höga Kusten Bridge

== Bibliography ==
- Bergström, Lars (1975). Höga kusten: natur, människor och tradition längs kusten från Sundsvall till Örnsköldsvik - ett av Sveriges vackraste och mest särpräglade landskap ISBN 91-0-040427-6 Stockholm : Bonniers 1975 80pp (The High Coast: the landscape, people and traditions along the coast from Sundsvall to Örnsköldsvik - one of Sweden's most beautiful and distinctive landscapes) (Swedish)
