= Kolbäck Bridge =

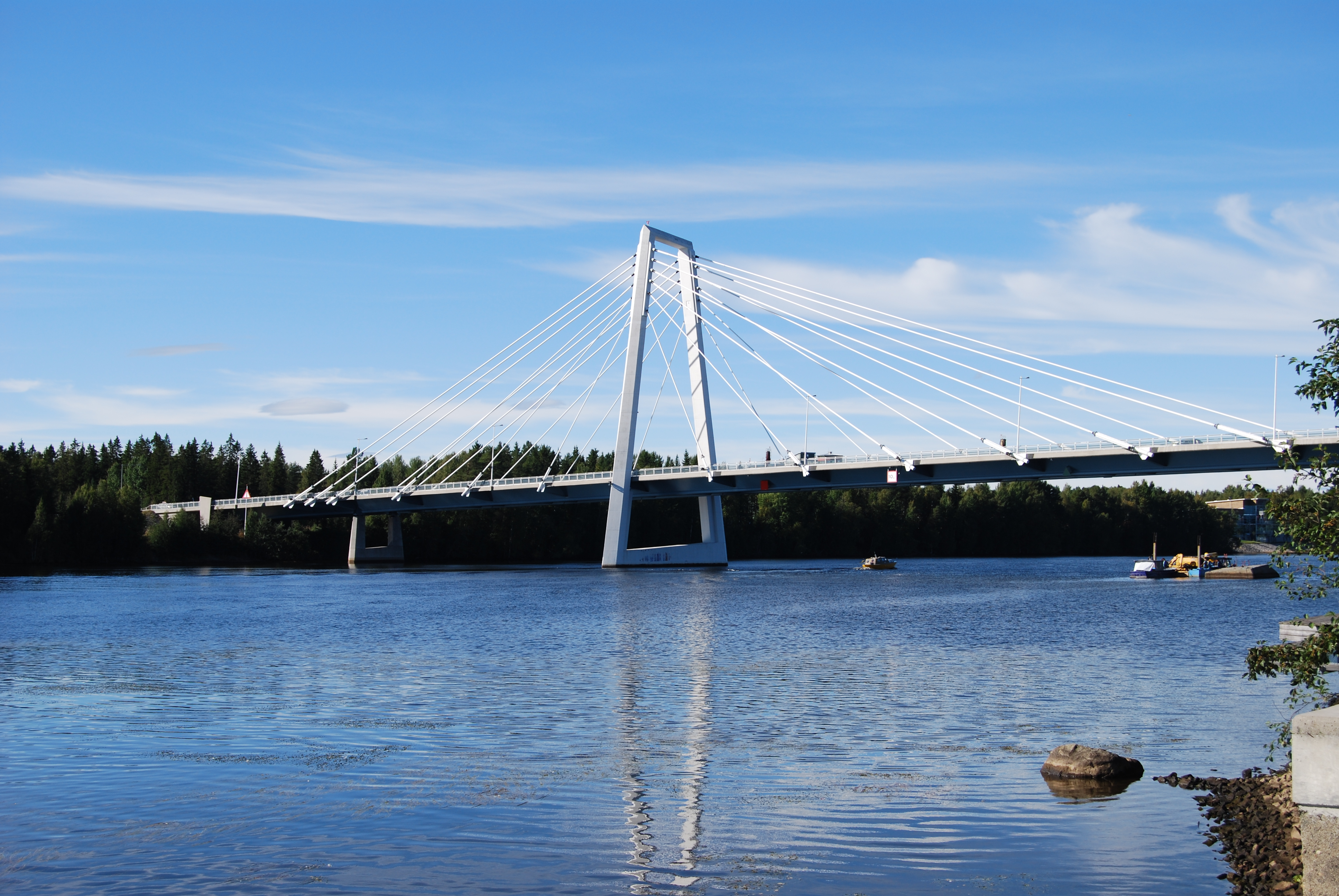
- The Kolbäck Bridge across Storån with Ön in the background.
- Coordinates: 63°48′4.0″N 20°17′43.6″E
- Carries: 3 lanes of E4
- Locale: Umeå, Västerbotten County

Characteristics
- Design: Cable-stayed bridge
- Total length: 522 meters (1,713 ft)
- Width: 17 meters (56 ft)
- Longest span: 130m

History
- Designer: Inger Berglund
- Construction start: 1998
- Construction end: 2001
- Construction cost: NOK 190 million

Location
- Interactive map of Kolbäck Bridge

The Kolbäck Bridge (Swedish: Kolbäcksbron) is a bridge crossing the Ume River in the eastern parts of the city of Umeå in northern Sweden. The bridge connects the island Ön in the river to the mainland on both sides. It crosses Lillån on the west side of the island and Storån on the east side.

The total length is 522 meters. It carries 3 lanes of European route E4, though it was originally designed for 2. The bridge was constructed between 1998 and 2001.

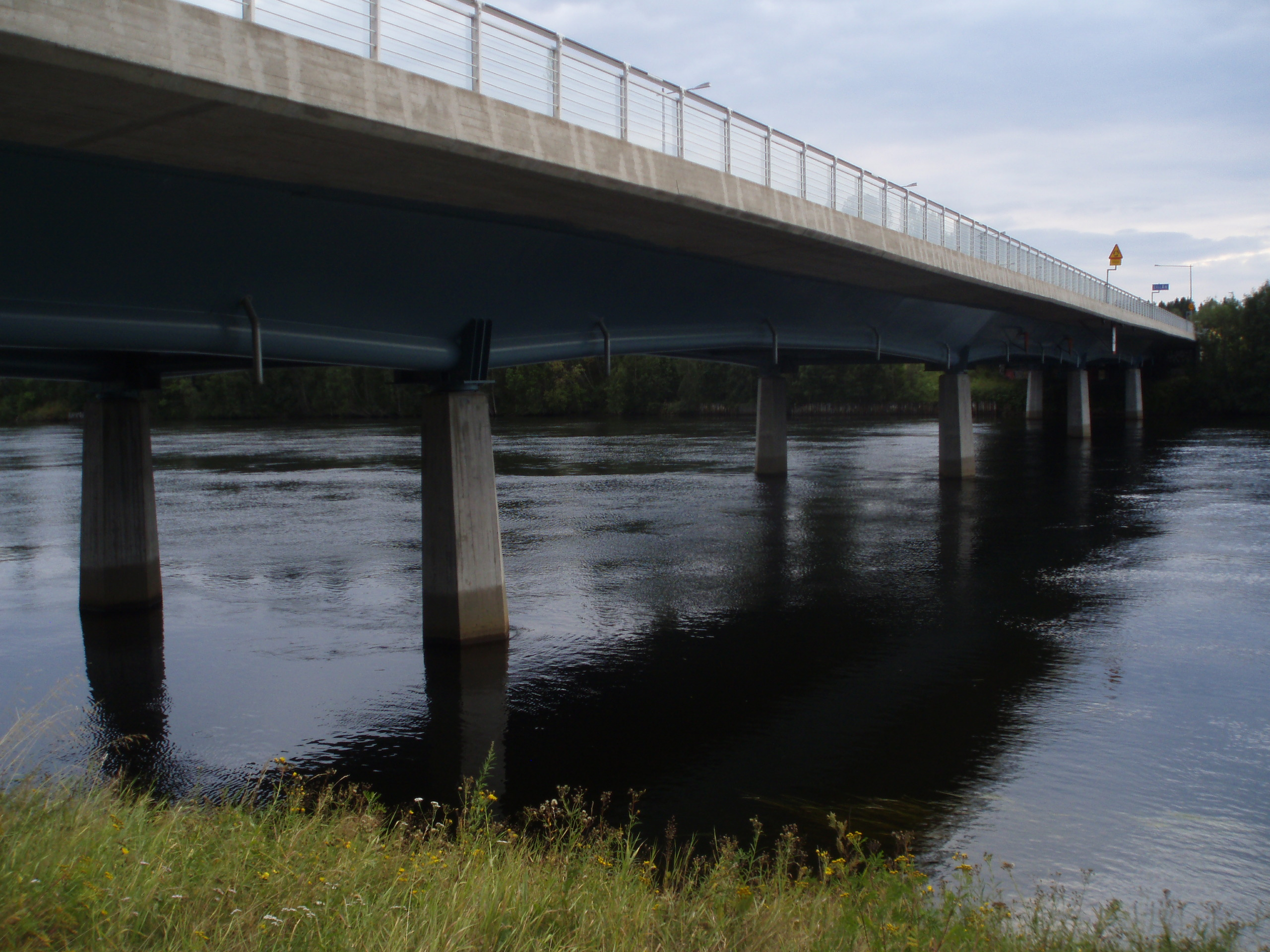
The Kolbäck Bridge across Lillån, seen from Ön.
