= Forsmo Bridge =

Coordinates: 63.2722°N 17.1986°E

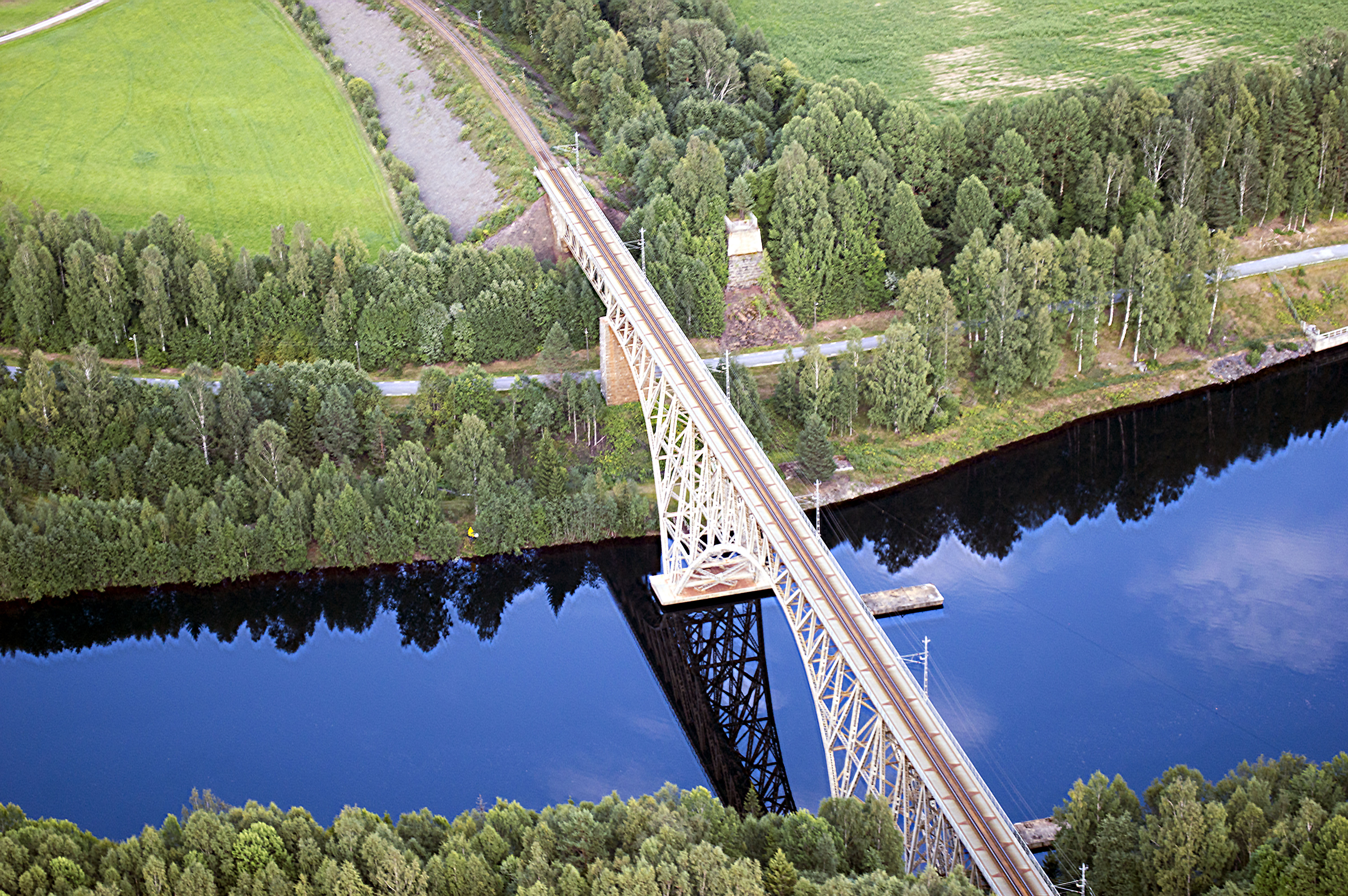
The bridge seen in 2014.

The Forsmo Bridge (Forsmobron in Swedish; also Forsmo järnvägsbron, the Forsmo railway bridge) is a railway bridge over the Ångerman in Northern Sweden.

== Details ==
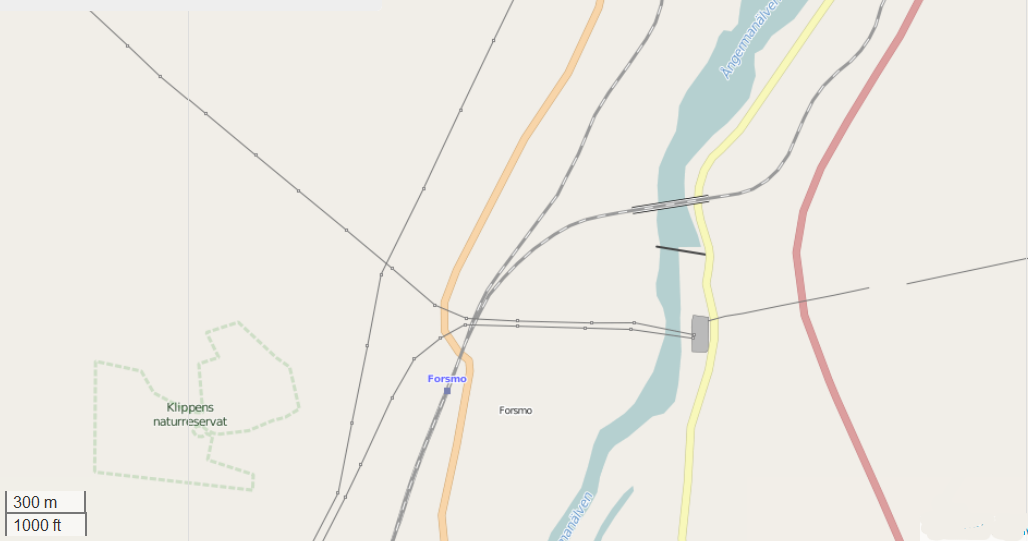
Map showing the rail bridge.

The railway bridge was built in 1912. It is a riveted steel-truss-arch railway bridge, 263m long and 50m high. It is located on the Main Line Through Upper Norrland. The 104m main bridge span is linked by hinges to the two side spans.

In 2002, a study was done to see if the bridge could be upgraded to handle freight trains with a 25 tonne axle load. It was determined that a total replacement of the upper superstructure with new longitudinal and cross beams will allow for 30 tonne axle loads and give the bridge a service lifetime of 100 years.
