= Sandö Bridge =

Sandö Bridge Sandöbron
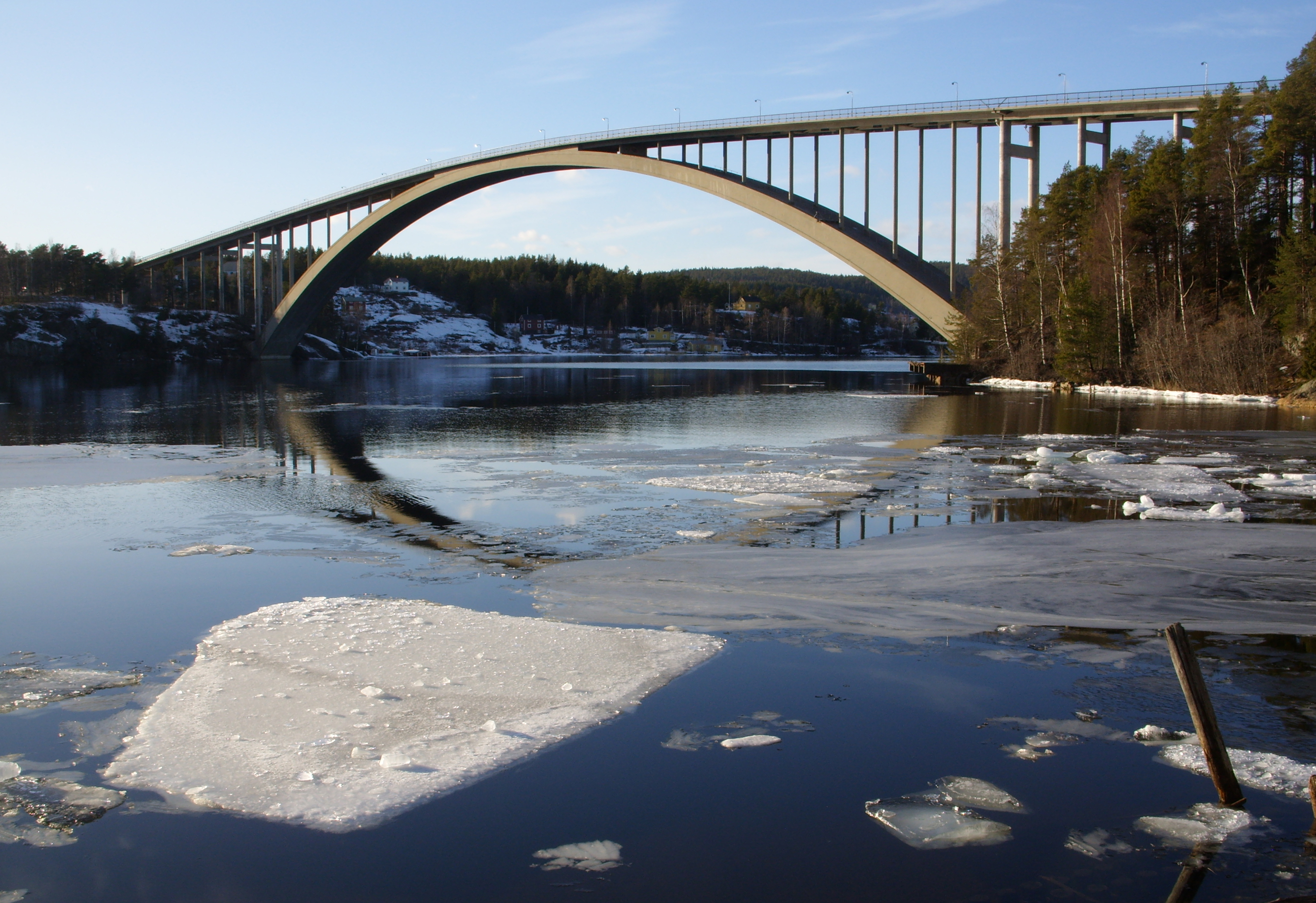
- Sandö bridge in February 2008
- Coordinates: 62°53′00″N 17°52′38″E
- Crosses: Ångerman River

Characteristics
- Design: arch bridge

History
- Opened: 16 July 1943

Statistics
- Daily traffic: road vehicles

The Sandö Bridge (Swedish: Sandöbron) is a concrete arch bridge crossing the Ångerman River in Kramfors Municipality in northern Sweden. It has a free span of 264 meters and is 42 meters above the water.

The surrounding area is often referred to as The High Coast.

During the construction, the bridge collapsed on 31 August 1939, and 18 workers were killed. This accident was given little attention by the press, since World War II started the morning after. The bridge was opened on 16 July 1943. Until 1964, it was the largest concrete arch in the world. It was renovated after 1997 and reopened in 2003.

On 1 December 1997, the Sandö Bridge was replaced as main road connection driving north to south along the coast by the Höga Kusten Bridge, the new bridge across the river, in a new extension of the European route E4 further downstream.
