= MS Star Clipper =

Ship built in 1969

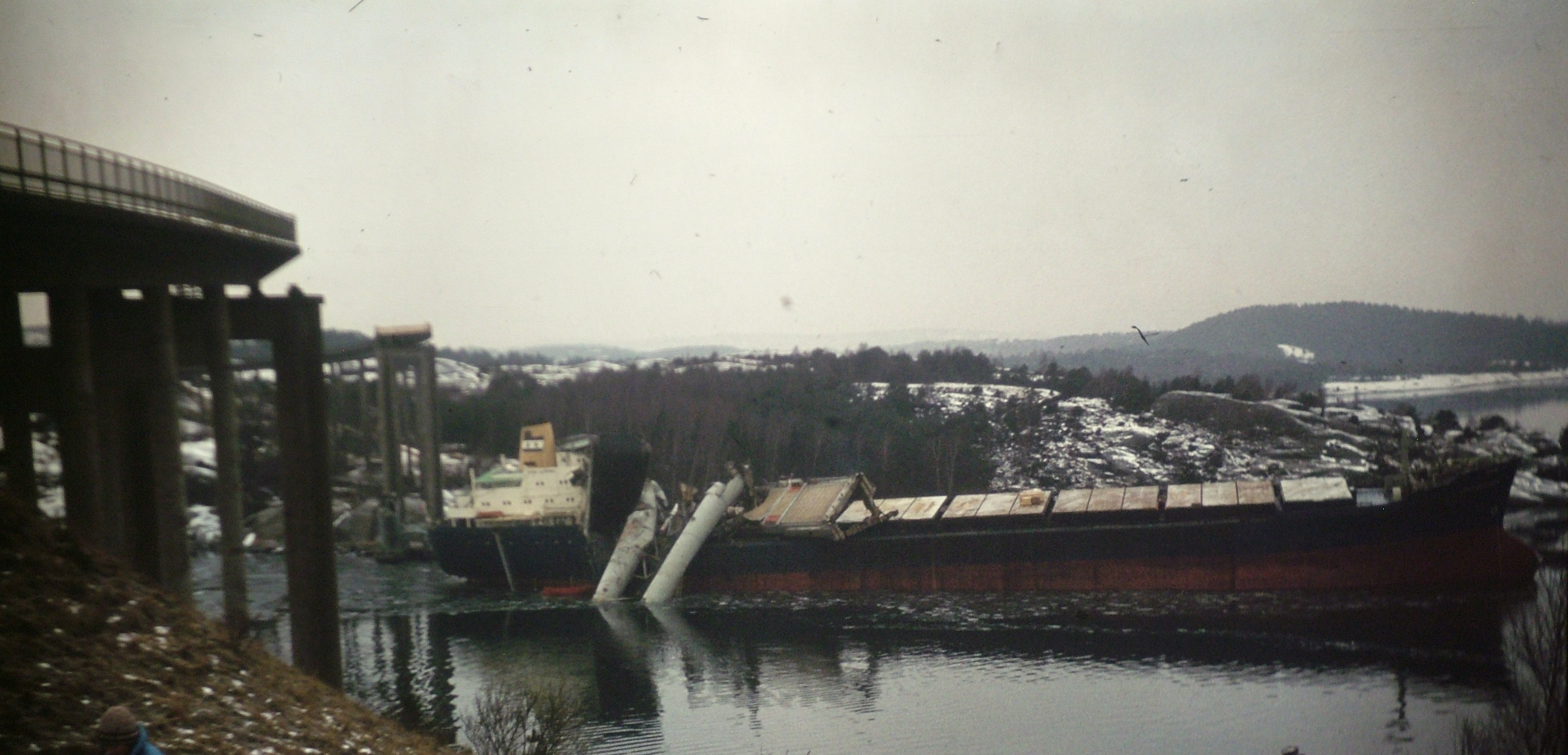
- After the collision, 1980.

History
- Name: 1969–1981: MS Star Clipper; 1981–1986: Star Lanao
- Builder: Kockums, Malmö, Sweden
- Yard number: 515
- Launched: 26 September 1968
- Completed: January 1969
- Out of service: 16 September 1986
- Identification: IMO number: 6826200
- Fate: Broken up, Karwar, India

General characteristics
- Type: Bulk carrier
- Tonnage: 16,532 GRT; 27,890 tonnes deadweight (DWT)
- Length: 171.9 m (564 ft 0 in)
- Beam: 26.0 m (85 ft 4 in)

MS Star Clipper was a Norwegian-owned bulk carrier built by Kockums in Malmö, Sweden in 1968. In 1981 she was sold and her name changed to Star Lanao. She was scrapped in India in 1986.

== Almö Bridge Disaster ==
She is best known for causing the Almö Bridge disaster on January 18th, 1980. In heavy fog she drifted too far off centerline while transiting the Uddevalla inlet. Her superstructure struck the western half of the bridge arch, collapsing the main span. The roadway landed on top of the ship, destroying the ship's bridge but causing no casualties onboard. 8 motorists however were killed as a result of the collapse, and from driving off the roadway into the fjord below due to heavy fog obscuring the collapsed main span from the approach ramps.

== See also ==
- MV Lake Illawarra - Collided with Tasman Bridge.
- MV Summit Venture - Collided with Sunshine Skyway Bridge.
- MV Delta Mariner - Collided with Eggner's Ferry Bridge.
- MV Dali - Collided with Francis Scott Key Bridge.
- List of bridge disasters
