= Sundsvall Bridge =

Sundsvall Bridge Sundsvallsbron
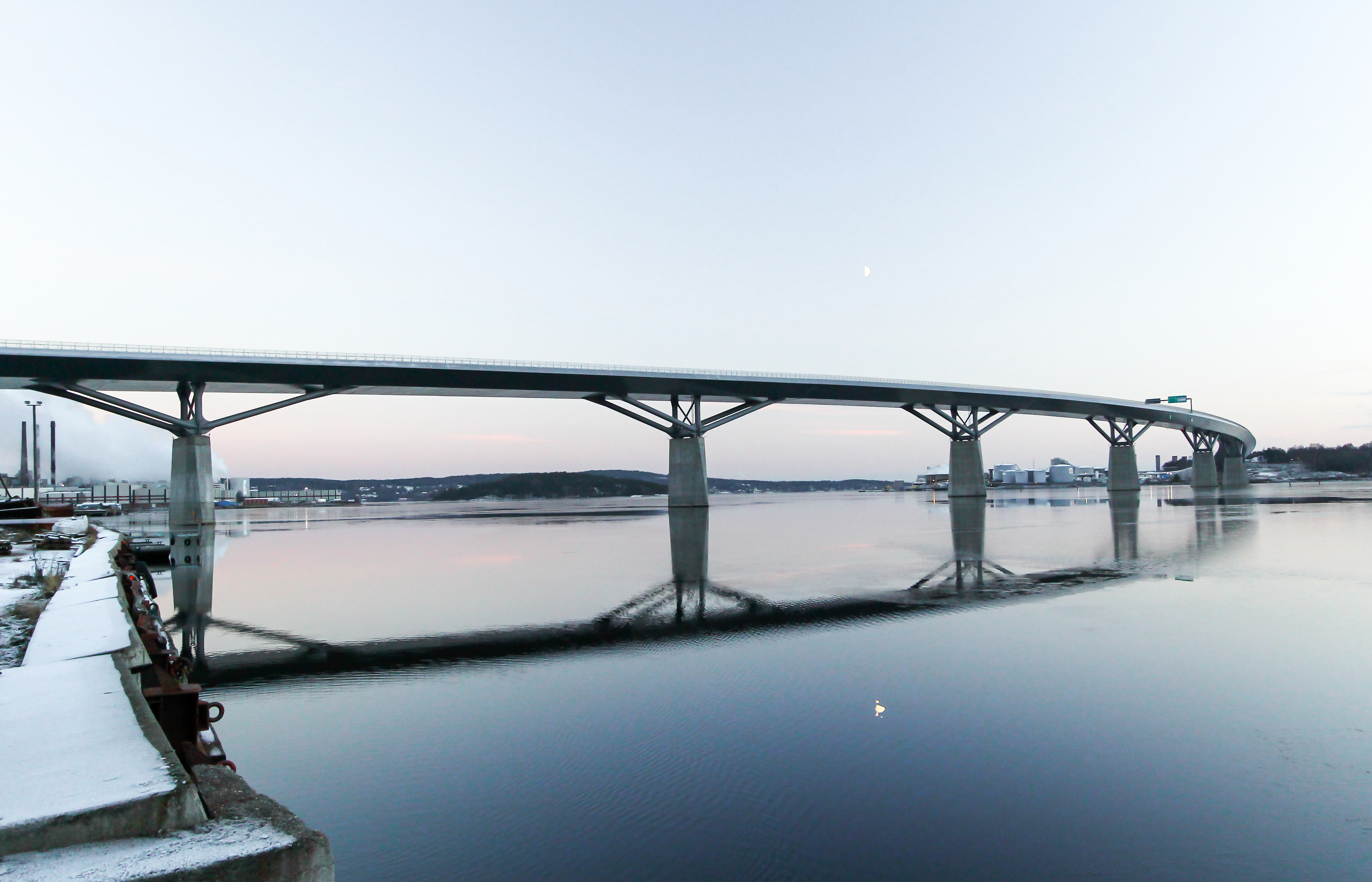
- The Sundsvall Bridge in November 2014
- Coordinates: 62°23′20″N 17°20′31″E
- Crosses: Sundsvall Bay

History
- Inaugurated: 18 December 2014

Statistics
- Daily traffic: road vehicles

The Sundsvall Bridge (Swedish: Sundsvallsbron) is a bridge across the Sundsvall Bay in Sundsvall, Sweden. It crosses the Bay of Sundsvall, bypassing the city. The bridge roadway is classed as motorway and forms part of European Route E4.

Since 1 February 2015 there has been a charge of SEK 9 per car, light truck and bus. Heavy trucks are charged SEK 20.

The bridge is 2,109 metres (6,919 ft) long and it was opened for traffic on 18 December 2014.
