= Almö Bridge =

Almö Bridge Almöbron
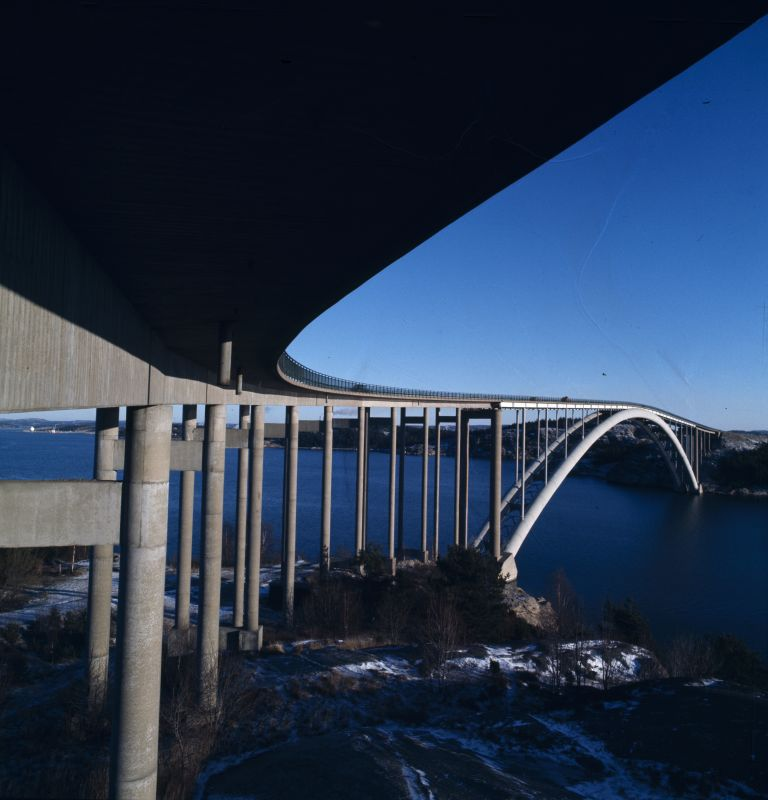
- Coordinates: 58.059722°N 11.785°E
- Crossed: Askerö fjord
- Preceded by: Car ferry
- Followed by: Tjörn Bridge

Characteristics
- Design: Arch Bridge
- Material: Prestressed concrete
- Clearance below: 41 meters
- Design life: 20 years

History
- Contracted lead designer: Krupp
- Constructed by: Krupp and Skånska Cementgjuteriet
- Inaugurated: June 15th, 1960
- Collapsed: 1:30 AM January 18th, 1980
- Closed: January 18th, 1980

The Almö Bridge (Swedish: Almöbron) stood from 1960, when it was built to connect the island of Tjörn to the Swedish mainland, until 1980, when it collapsed after a ship hit it.

Built after a suggestion from Krupp, the arch bridge type was cheap to build but it also had narrow roadways that slowed traffic. Below it was the busy shipping lane leading to the town of Uddevalla, which sported a large shipyard and bulk harbor at the time.

== Collapse ==
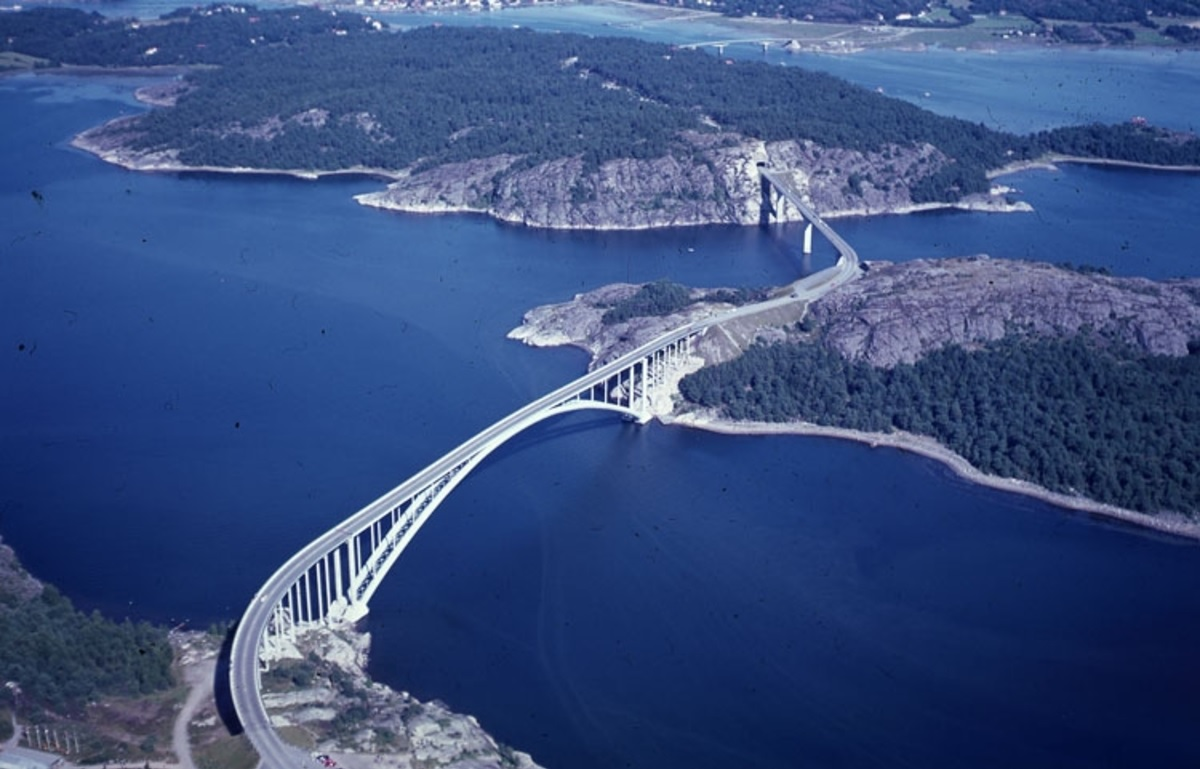
The Almö Bridge in 1962

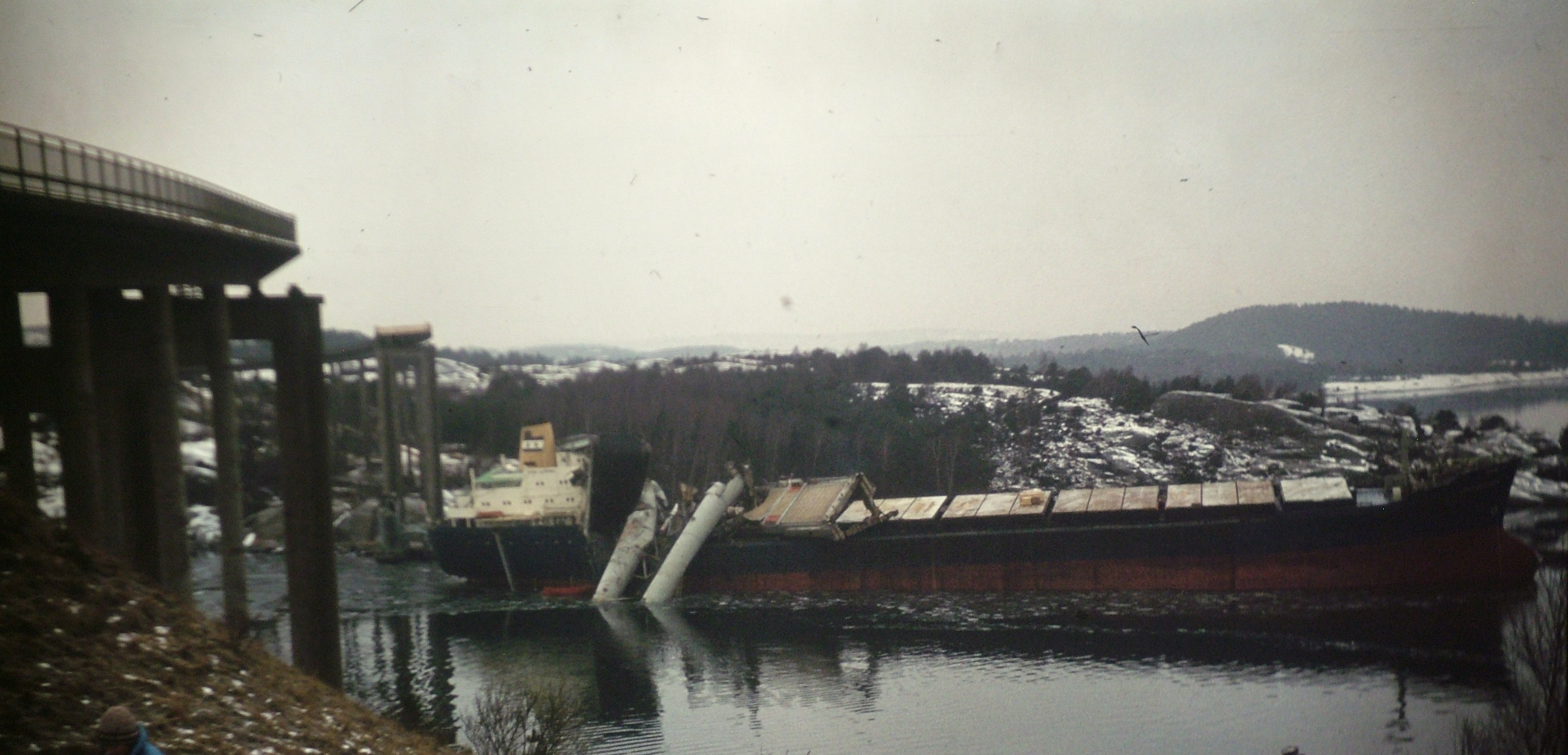
Collapsed bridge and MS Star Clipper

The Almö bridge collapsed at 1:30 a.m. on January 18, 1980, when the bulk carrier MS Star Clipper struck the bridge arch, collapsing the main span. The roadway landed on top of the ship, destroying the ship's bridge but causing no casualties. The loss of the bridge made radio communication difficult, as the Swedish pilot had to use a handheld VHF radio. Because of the ice, the ship was unable to launch a boat to get to shore and warn motorists as fog descended on the area. Eight people died driving over the edge before the road on the Tjörn side was closed 40 minutes after the accident. The mainland side had been closed by a lorry driver who had slowly driven up the bridge in the fog, noticing the railing was missing; he stopped his lorry ten meters ahead of the missing roadway.

== The bridge today ==
The large arch foundations still exist but the bridge was never rebuilt.

A replacement, the Tjörn Bridge, was constructed in 17 months and opened the following year. The cable-stayed bridge has wider lanes for road traffic and eliminates its predecessor's vulnerability to ship collisions.

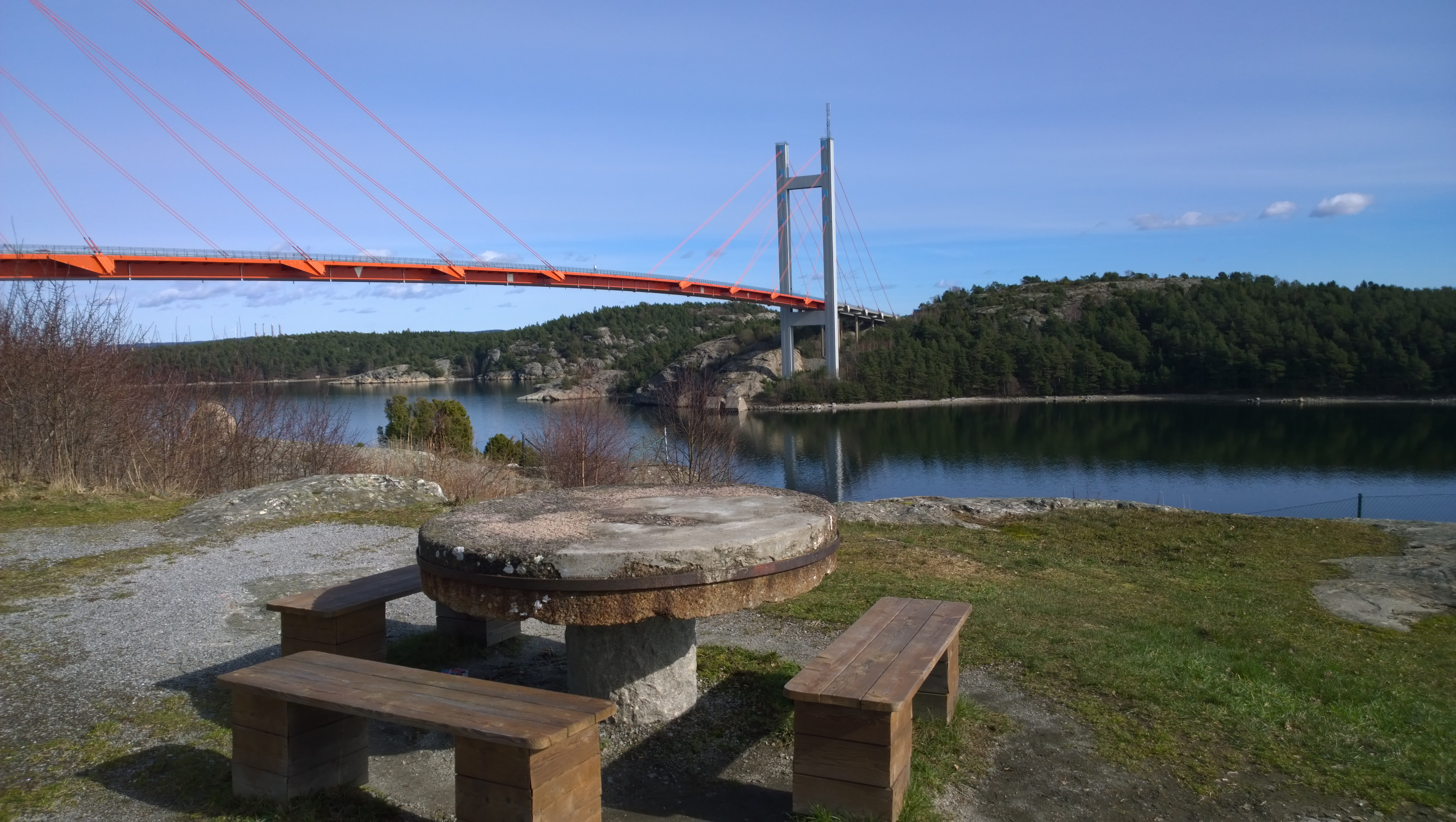
The new Bridge with the foundations for the arch of the Almö Bridge still visible at the water's edge

== See also ==
- List of bridge failures
