= Iddefjord =

Fjord in Norway and Sweden

Coordinates: 59°03′N 11°24′E

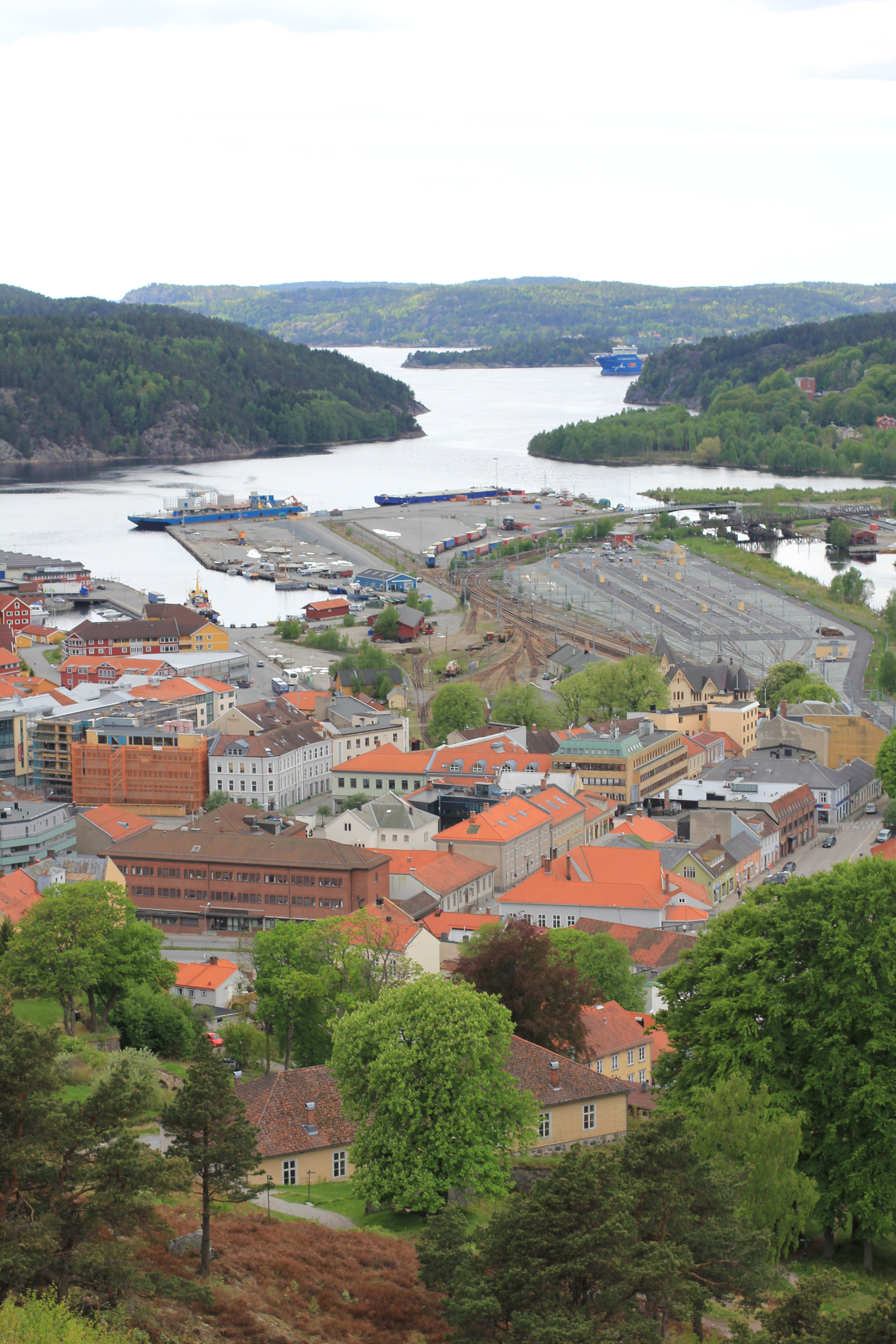
Iddefjorden seen from Fredriksten

Iddefjord (English: Idd Fjord or Idde Fjord; Norwegian: Iddefjorden); Swedish: Idefjorden) is a classic fjord with a narrow watercourse and steep natural formations on both sides. It runs along the Norwegian-Swedish border from the Singlefjord (English: Single Fjord). The Iddefjord separates the province of Bohuslän in the county of Västra Götaland in Sweden from the municipality of Halden in the county of Østfold in Norway. It opens to the Skagerrak via the Svinesund and Hvaler archipelago (a cluster of classic skerries). The outermost stretch is called the Ringdalsfjord (English: Ringdals Fjord), but from the point where it makes a sharp bend and further south, it is called the Iddefjord. Like several other fjords, it was named after a part of its coast, in this case the parish of Idd.
