= Höga Kusten Bridge =

High Coast Bridge
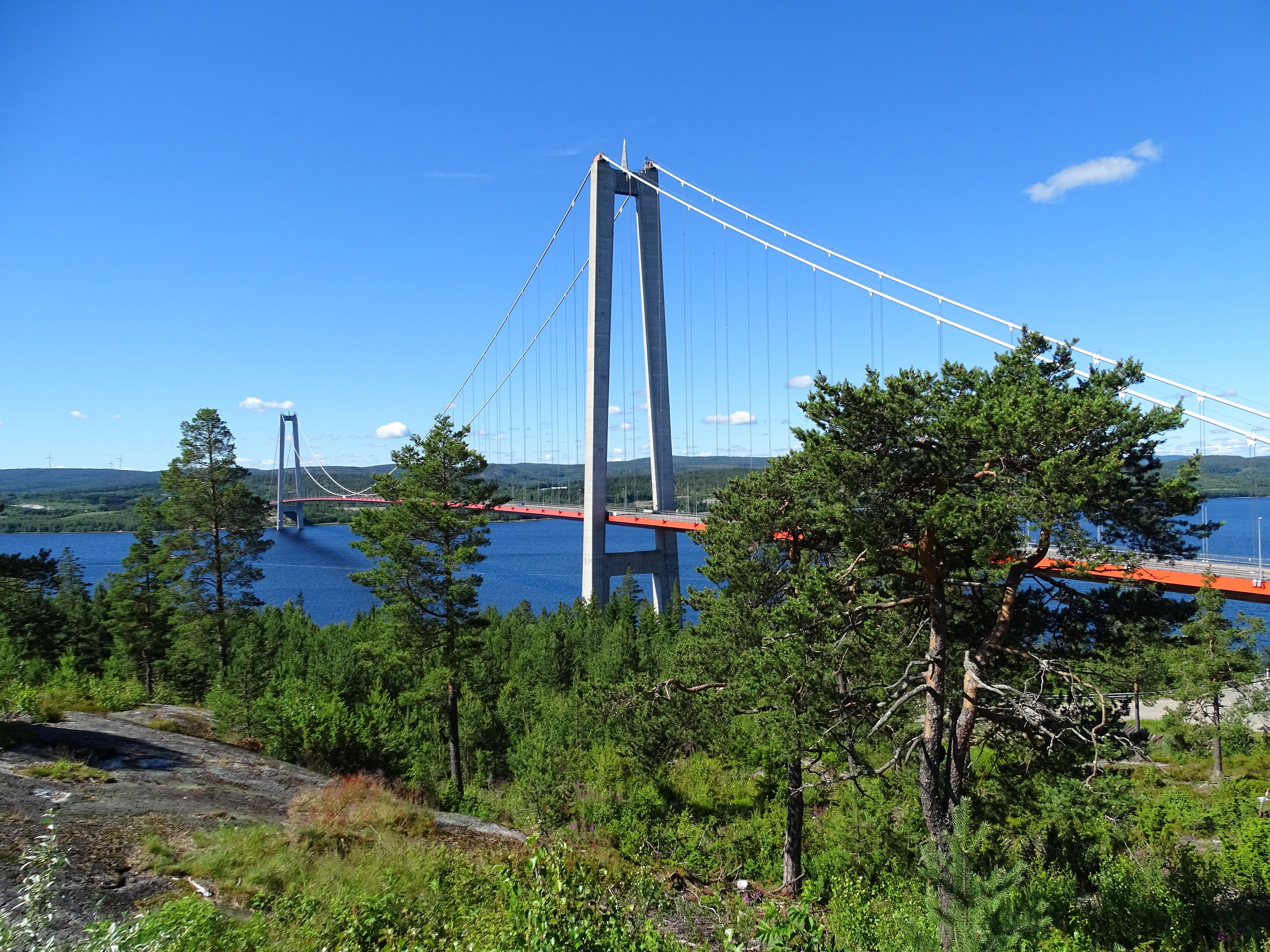
- The High Coast Bridge seen from the northern bank of the Ångerman River in July 2016.
- Coordinates: 62.797419°N 17.938233°E
- Carries: 4 lanes of European route E4
- Crosses: Ångermanälven
- Locale: Ångermanland
- Official name: Höga Kustenbron
- Maintained by: Swedish Transport Administration

Characteristics
- Design: Suspension bridge
- Material: Concrete, steel
- Total length: 1,867 metres (6,125 ft)
- Width: 22 metres (72 ft)
- Height: 196 metres (643 ft)
- Longest span: 1,210 metres (3,970 ft)
- No. of spans: 1
- Piers in water: 2
- Clearance below: 40 metres (131 ft)

History
- Construction start: 1993
- Opened: 1 December 1997

The High Coast Bridge (Swedish: Högakustenbron), also known as the Veda Bridge (Swedish: Vedabron), is a suspension bridge crossing the mouth of the river Ångermanälven near Veda, on the border between the municipalities of Härnösand and Kramfors in the province of Ångermanland in northern Sweden. The area is often referred to as High Coast, hence its name. The older bridge across the same river is the Sandö Bridge, in a new extension of the European route E4. It is (as of 2016) the third longest suspension bridge in Scandinavia (after the Great Belt Fixed Link in Denmark and Hardanger Bridge in Norway), the fourth longest in Europe, and the 21st longest of the world.

The total length is 1,867 metres (6,125 ft), the span is 1,210 metres (3,970 ft), and the column pillars are 196 metres (643 ft) tall. The max height for ships is 40 metres (131 ft). The bridge was constructed between 1993 and 1997 and was officially opened on 1 December 1997 by king Carl XVI Gustaf of Sweden.

The shorter name, the Veda Bridge, refers to the village Veda, which lies 1 km west of the south abutment of the bridge.
