= Skuleberget =

Mountain in High Coast area of Sweden

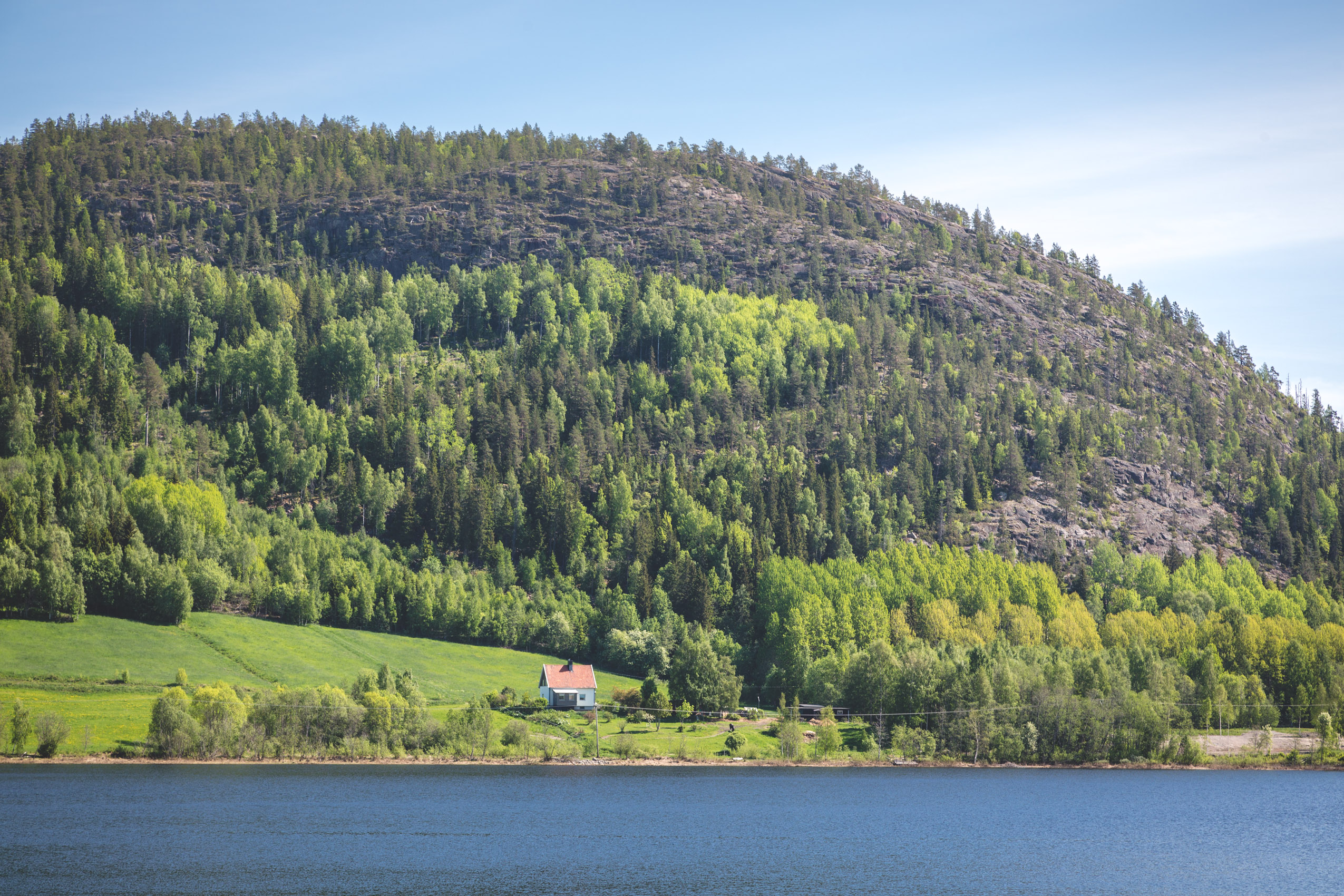
- View of Skuleberget from Gällstasjön Lake

Highest point
- Elevation: 295 m (968 ft)
- Prominence: 286 m (938 ft)
- Coordinates: 63.08426°N 18.34991°E

Naming
- Language of name: Swedish

Geography
- Location within Sweden
- Location: Docksta, Västernorrland County, Sweden

Skuleberget is a mountain on the west side of the E4 motorway a few kilometers north of Docksta in Kramfors municipality in Ångermanland (Västernorrland County), Sweden. Skuleberget is near, but not part of the Skuleskogen National Park, as the national park is on the east side of the E4.

The mountain falls almost vertically along the side facing the highway, creating a dramatic effect that can easily be seen from the road below. Up on the mountain there are a number of paths and Via Ferrata climbing trails, which start next to the Naturum Höga Kusten information center at old Riksväg 13 ("Rikstretton"). A chairlift is also available for use during both the winter and summer months to carry people to the summit.

At 286 metres (938 ft) above sea-level, Skuleberget has the worlds highest coastline. The mountain, as part of the large High Coast region, is considered a World Heritage Site.

== Geology ==
During the last ice age, the area was repeatedly covered by continental ice sheet, specifically, the Fenno-Scandian ice sheet. Approximately 10,500 years ago, when the ice began melting, most of the High Coast (Swedish: Höga kusten) was covered by the Mastogloia Sea, with only the highest mountain summits cresting above the water as islands. After the ice receded to modern levels, the landmass started to rise up to 10 cm (3.9 in) every year. The once nine-meter-high island today has the world's highest marine boundary/coastline.

Due to Skuleberget's history as a prehistoric island, the mountain is one of few till-capped mountains in the High Coast-area. The summit has a layer of sediment and spruce, while the cliffs that were under sea level after the ice age were eroded by the glacial movements.

== History ==
Skuleberget, and the High Coast in general, have been mentioned in the earliest travel logs from the Ångermanland region, with the remnants of fishing huts, villages, and ships still preserved in the wilderness.

=== Cave ===
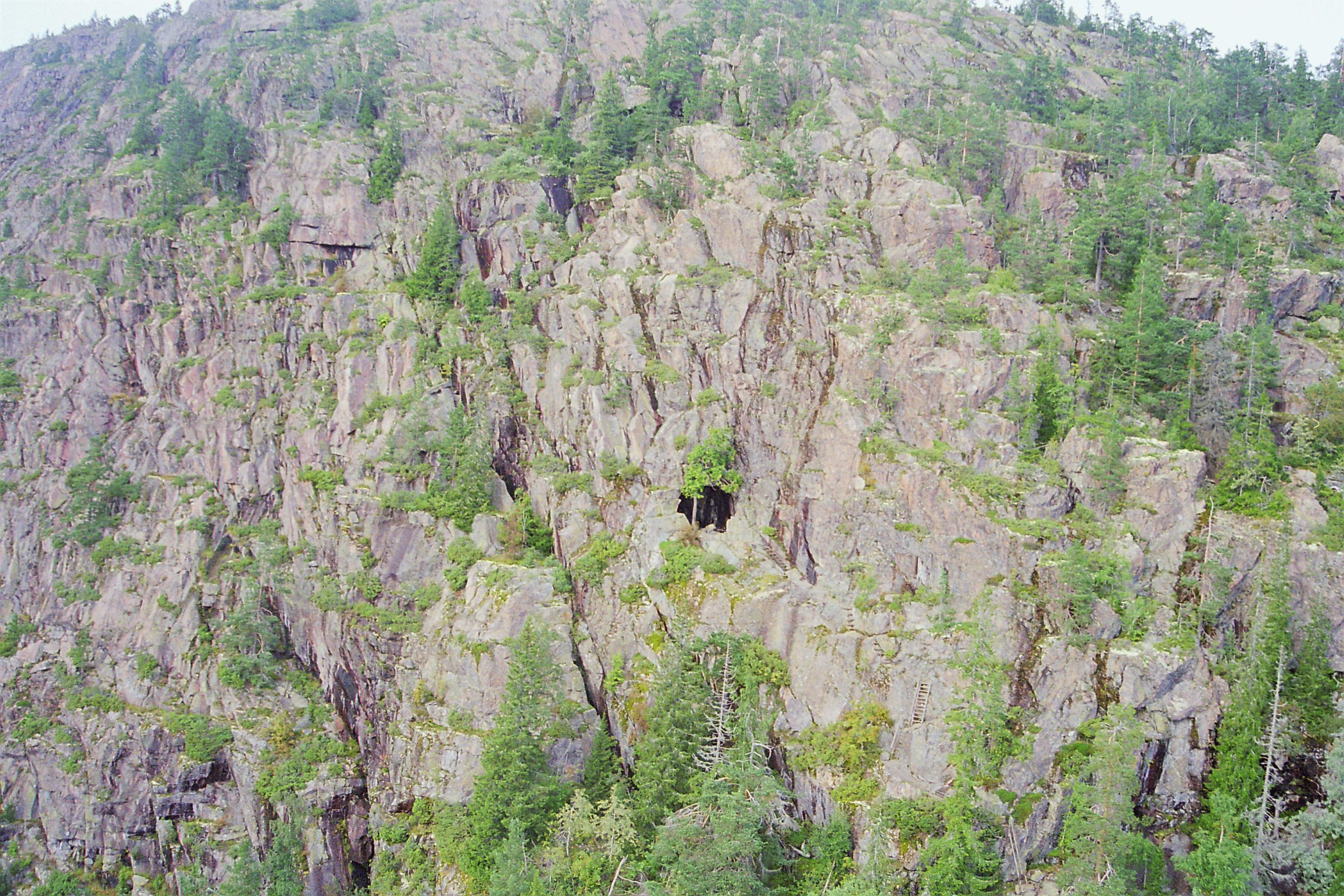
King's Cave (Kungsgrottan) as seen from the E4

Likely formed from erosion by waves thousands of years ago, Kungsgrottan, or King's Cave, has long been the main attraction on Skuleberget. Area folklore also tells of the cave being used as a haven for bands of robbers looking to attack travelers and local passers-by. According to the Nordic Museum's folk memory archive, robbers came to Skuleskogen by sea sometime during the 17th century. When the bandits came into conflict with the locals, they took refuge in the cave. This led to the cave also being called Rövargrottan, or Robber's Cave.

== Flora ==
The steep eastern slope of Skuleberget captures the heat of the sun and provides a warmer local climate and longer growing season than the surrounding area. This provides optimum growing conditions for plants that normally would not be able to thrive as far north as the mountain is.

The mountain claims one of the northern-most outposts of hazel and tilia cordata. Also found in the area are polygonatum odoratum, geranium robertianum, and asplenium trichomanes.

== Recreation ==
Various tourist facilities are located in connection with the mountain, which is also part of the tourist destination Höga Kusten Turism (High Coast Tourism).

Kramfors municipality's largest alpine ski resort with three lifts, including a fixed four-seater lift, opened in midsummer 2021, which replaced the two-seater lift from 1965, and four slopes (six slopes with two link passages). The chairlift is also run in summer for transporting pedestrians.

On the south side of Skuleberget is the FriluftsByn attraction, an outdoor village which includes a play area, social areas, and a beach, and a former labyrinth.

== See also ==
- The Kings Cave, a shallow cave alongside the Göta River, Trollhättan
