= Skuleskogen National Park =

National park in Sweden

- Skuleskogens nationalpark
- IUCN category II (national park)
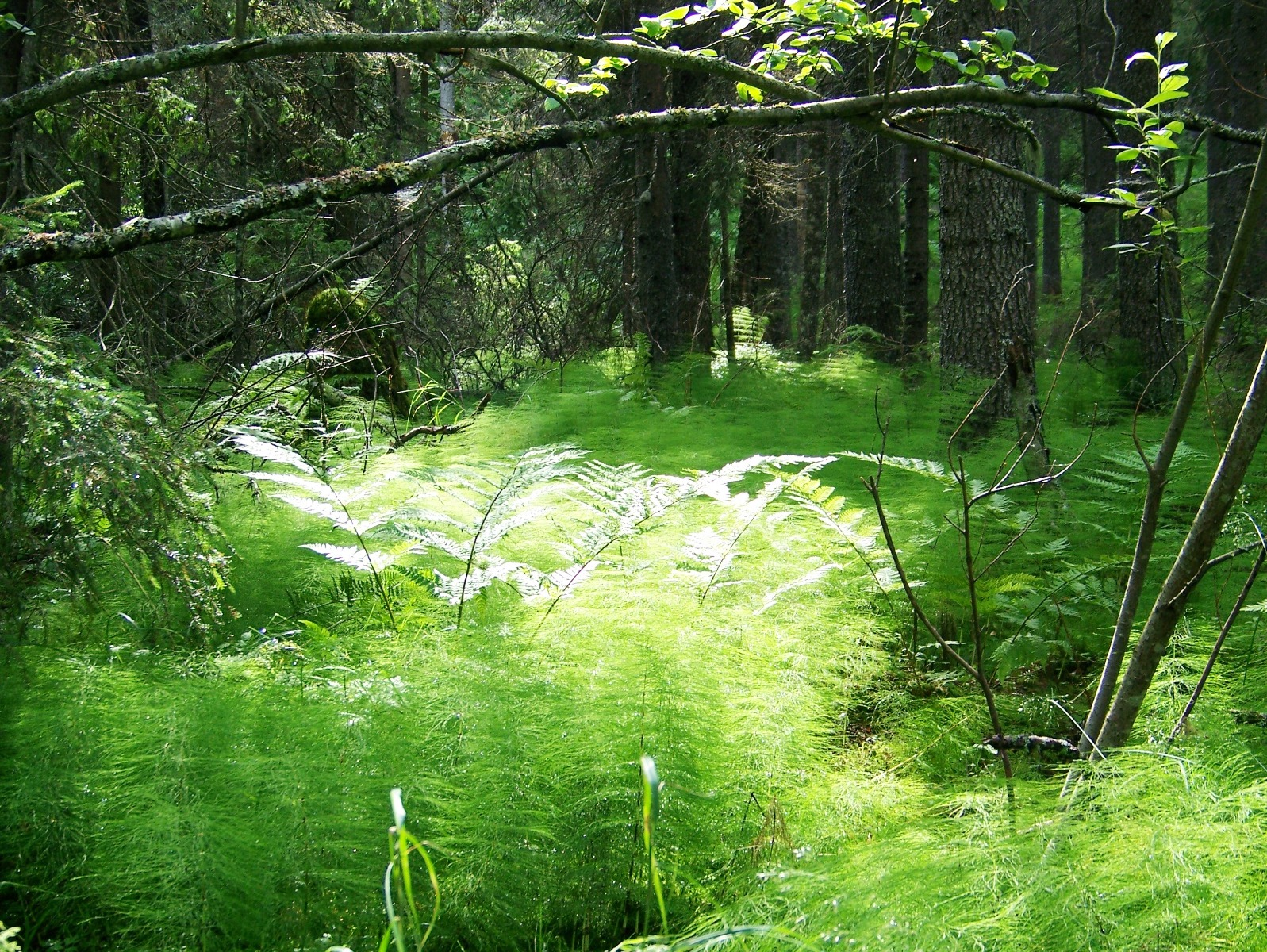
- Interactive map of Skuleskogen National Park
- Location: Västernorrland County, Sweden
- Coordinates: 63°07′N 18°30′E
- Area: 30.62 km^{2} (11.82 sq mi)
- Established: 1984, extended 2009
- Governing body: Naturvårdsverket

National parks of Sweden (clickable map)

Skuleskogen National Park (Swedish: Skuleskogens nationalpark, literally The Skule Forest National Park) is a Swedish national park in Västernorrland County, on the coast of the Baltic Sea, in northern Sweden. It covers 30.62 km^{2} (11.82 mi^{2}), constituting the eastern part of the Forest of Skule.

The park is characterized by a very rough topology with many rocky peaks, of which the highest is Slåttdalsberget, 280 m (920 ft) in altitude, rising directly from the sea. The topography is also marked by the presence of deep crevasses and caves. This particular topology can be found throughout the entire High Coast (Swedish: Höga kusten), a region of Sweden so named because it constitutes the highest section of the coast of the Baltic Sea. This region is in our day principally known as a favoured site for the observation of the phenomenon of post-glacial rebound. Most of the region was under the sea less than 10,000 years ago, after the ice sheet that blanketed it melted. But thanks to the melting of this mass of ice that had been pressing down upon it, the ground is rising year by year, at a current speed of 8 mm (0.31 in) per year.

Humans have left their mark upon the park, although they probably never established themselves there in great numbers. Numerous Bronze Age funerary cairns are still visible along the ancient coastline. Later, the forest was mainly used as pasture. Things changed in the middle of the 19th century when the logging industry spread throughout Sweden, affecting almost all the forest of the park. This exploitation ceased, however, at the end of that century, so that the current forest is dominated by trees more than 100 years old. This forest has thus been able to recover a part of its ancestral richness, and so contains an important fauna and flora, with several endangered species, such as the lichen Usnea longissima, which is the park's symbol. This geological and biological richness led to the creation of a national park in 1984, followed by the inclusion of the park with the rest of the High Coast in 2000 in the UNESCO World Heritage List.

Today, despite its distance from areas of dense human population, the park is a relatively important site of tourism with 20,000 visitors per year. The principal attraction of the park is the 40 m (130 ft) deep crevasse of Slåttdalskrevan, which is easily accessible by numerous hiking trails, including the Höga Kustenleden, which goes along the whole of the High Coast.

== Toponymy ==
The national park takes its name from the forest of Skule, of which it constitutes the eastern part. The name Skuleskogen in Swedish means "the forest of Skule", the word Skule being common in the place names nearby, with for example Skuleberget ("mountain of Skule"), Skulesjön ("lake of Skule") or even the villages Skule and Skulnäs. However, there is a debate as to which toponym came first and was then transmitted to the others, as well as the meaning of this toponym.

A first hypothesis is that the name would have issued from the mountain Skuleberget, this being a point particularly notable in the landscape and one which would thus have been rapidly named. This name already appears in 1539 in the form Scyla mons and would derive from skjul meaning "hiding place", the famous cave in the mountain having been in the past a refuge for brigands. Another hypothesis is that the name would have come from the village of Skule; Skuleskogen thus being "the forest on the way to Skule" or "the forest which belongs to Skule", Skule being the village allowed to pasture animals in the forest. This last hypothesis does not imply that the mountain did not have a name before the village of Skule came into being; the original name would have been a name which one ought not to pronounce, as is true of many places in the country, another name not forbidden then coming into common usage and replacing the old one.

== Geography ==
=== Location and borders ===
Skuleskogen National Park is in the municipalities of Örnsköldsvik and Kramfors, both of Västernorrland County, both in the historical Swedish province of Ångermanland. It is 27 kilometres (17 mi) south of the city of Örnsköldsvik and 40 kilometres (25 mi) north of the city of Kramfors, the respective capitals of the municipalities mentioned above. It covers a surface area of 3,062 hectares (7,570 acres) of which 282 hectares (700 acres) are maritime, the park stretching, in fact, along the coast of the Baltic Sea.

=== Topography ===
Map of the park

The park is included in the region called the High Coast, a zone of very rough relief, forming a joint valley landscape (Swedish: sprickdalslandskap): a landscape gouged by many small valleys formed by the erosion of fissures and faults in the bedrock. The High Coast is generally defined as the portion of the eastern coast of Sweden between the cities of Härnösand and Örnsköldsvik. The name of this region comes from the fact that it is the highest section of the coast of the Baltic Sea, numerous summits elevating themselves from the sea to attain altitudes of 200 to 250 metres (820 ft). This rugged terrain stretches even under the surface of the sea; so, it is in this region that one finds the deepest point of the Bothnian Sea, Ulvödjupet, with a depth of 293 metres (961 ft). The park itself covers the eastern part of the forest of Skule, characterized by a terrain forming a sort of wall separating the north and the south.

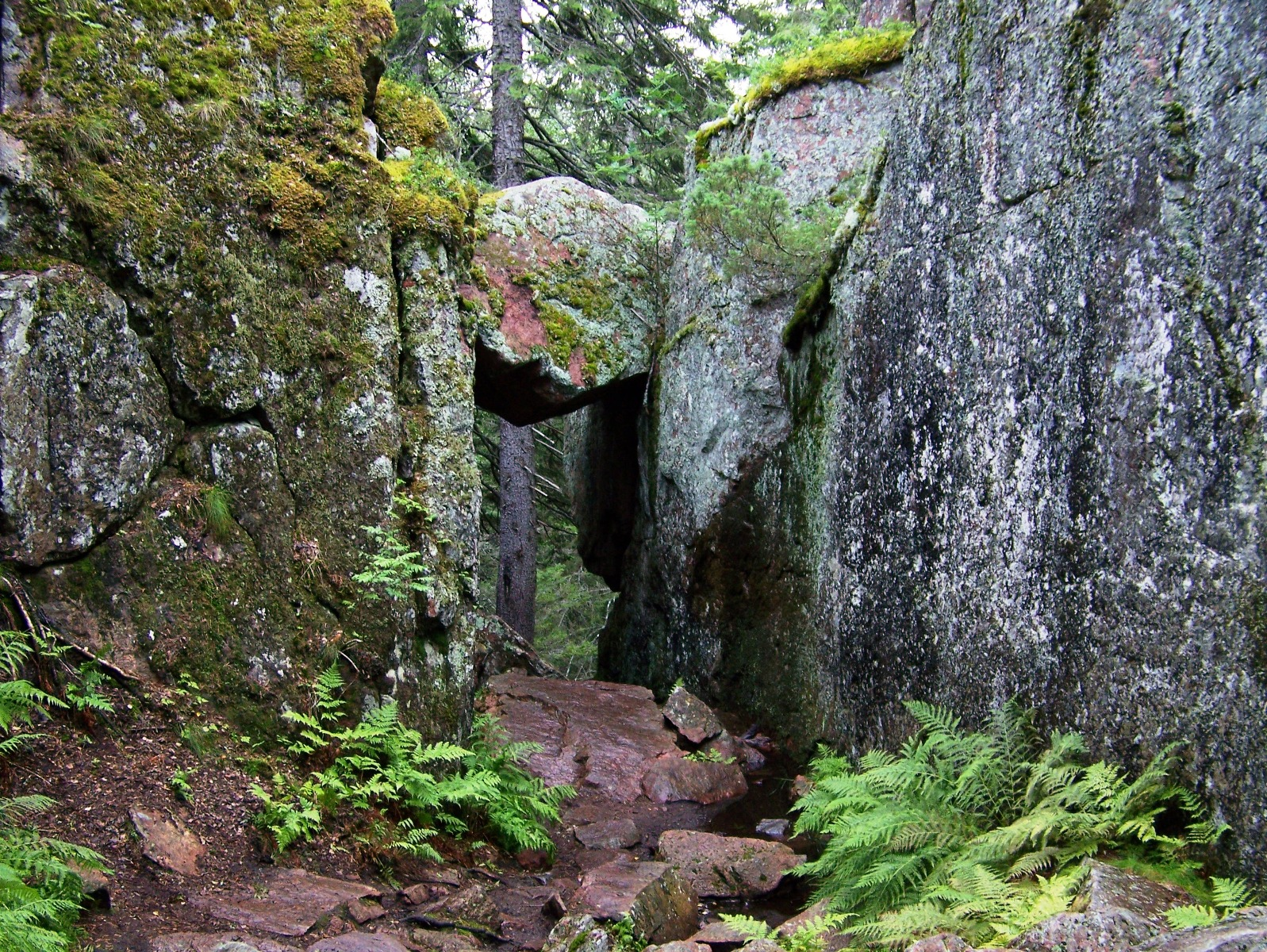
Trollporten ("Trolls' Door"), in the park

The topography of the park is characterized by these small valleys (sprickdal), some even taking the appearance of vertitable crevasses, the most impressive being Slåttdalskrevan (40 metres (130 ft) deep, 200 metres (660 ft) long, 8 metres (26 ft) wide), but also significant being Trollporten (the "Trolls' Door"), a small crevasse celebrated for the rock that rests across the top. Another characteristic element is the presence of many caves, although the most famous, Skulegrottan, in the mountain Skuleberget, is not inside the park. The park's highest peak is Slåttdalsberget, at 280 metres (920 ft) of altitude.

=== Climate ===
The national park is bathed in a subarctic climate (Dfc according to the Köppen classification). The maritime influence explains why its early summers are colder than they are farther inland, but its autumns are in contrast more mild. The topography causes important local variations. The climate is humid, with about 700 millimetres (28 in) of precipitation per year, of which more than a third in the form of snow, forming a snow cover lasting on average 175 days. Spring is the driest season, and in certain years this relative dryness has important consequences for the environment, especially because the thinness of the soil retains moisture poorly. In the regions acid rain most powerfully affected, surveys indicated that the situation is getting better, the pH of the precipitation gently increasing.

The nearest climate station to Skuleskogen National Park is in the village of Västmarkum, approximately 10 kilometers west. The station’s more inland and elevated (143 meters) positioning possibly renders the national park much milder, especially during late summer and early fall.

According to the Köppen climate classification, Skuleskogen National Park has a borderline subarctic climate (Dfc) with a notable dry-spring/early summer precipitation pattern. Extremes have ranged from 30.8 °C set during June 2020, to an all-time low of -26.4 °C from February 2018. The driest year was 2018 with 647 millimeters of precipitation whereas the wettest was 2020 when 1,061 millimeters of precipitation fell. The annual precipitation of almost 1000mm is by Swedish standards, especially east coast standards, very high. The high precipitation anomaly is largely due to the orographic lift effect owing to the adjacent hilly terrain of the High Coast. The precipitation is anticipated to further increase because of climate change. It is widely known that the region’s snow depth can vary depending on elevation and maritime influence from the Bothnian Sea. It is thus a high possibility the given snow depth data is skewed since it is measured 30 kilometers south of the Skuleskogen National Park, meaning that the park probably receives more snowfall.

Climate data for Västmarkum A 2018-2023 averages and extremes; snow depth in Nora Östanö D 2018-2023.
Month	Jan	Feb	Mar	Apr	May	Jun	Jul	Aug	Sep	Oct	Nov	Dec	Year
Record high °C (°F)	9.2 (48.6)	8.5 (47.3)	14.4 (57.9)	21.2 (70.2)	25.3 (77.5)	30.8 (87.4)	30.1 (86.2)	28.6 (83.5)	24.0 (75.2)	18.7 (65.7)	11.7 (53.1)	6.6 (43.9)	30.8 (87.4)
Mean maximum °C (°F)	5.5 (41.9)	6 (43)	10.3 (50.5)	15.3 (59.5)	22.4 (72.3)	26.2 (79.2)	26.4 (79.5)	24.6 (76.3)	19.3 (66.7)	13.5 (56.3)	7.7 (45.9)	4.5 (40.1)	26.4 (79.5)
Mean daily maximum °C (°F)	−1.7 (28.9)	−0.2 (31.6)	2.8 (37.0)	7.9 (46.2)	13.6 (56.5)	19.8 (67.6)	21.0 (69.8)	19.3 (66.7)	14.5 (58.1)	6.4 (43.5)	1.5 (34.7)	−1.3 (29.7)	8.6 (47.5)
Daily mean °C (°F)	−5.8 (21.6)	−5.6 (21.9)	−3.4 (25.9)	2.2 (36.0)	7.3 (45.1)	13.3 (55.9)	15.0 (59.0)	13.8 (56.8)	9.4 (48.9)	3.0 (37.4)	−1.4 (29.5)	−4.8 (23.4)	3.6 (38.4)
Mean daily minimum °C (°F)	−9.8 (14.4)	−11.0 (12.2)	−9.5 (14.9)	−3.6 (25.5)	0.9 (33.6)	6.8 (44.2)	9.0 (48.2)	8.3 (46.9)	4.2 (39.6)	−0.4 (31.3)	−4.3 (24.3)	−8.3 (17.1)	−1.5 (29.4)
Mean minimum °C (°F)	−20.9 (−5.6)	−22.3 (−8.1)	−20.7 (−5.3)	−11.6 (11.1)	−4.7 (23.5)	0.7 (33.3)	2.6 (36.7)	1.2 (34.2)	−2.1 (28.2)	−8.0 (17.6)	−14.4 (6.1)	−19.7 (−3.5)	−22.3 (−8.1)
Record low °C (°F)	−25.3 (−13.5)	−26.4 (−15.5)	−24.6 (−12.3)	−15.7 (3.7)	−6.8 (19.8)	−0.4 (31.3)	−0.1 (31.8)	−0.4 (31.3)	−4.1 (24.6)	−10.5 (13.1)	−19.6 (−3.3)	−25.6 (−14.1)	−26.4 (−15.5)
Average precipitation mm (inches)	101.8 (4.01)	58.0 (2.28)	53.2 (2.09)	38.3 (1.51)	47.5 (1.87)	41.5 (1.63)	107.3 (4.22)	114.6 (4.51)	101.2 (3.98)	108.0 (4.25)	93.7 (3.69)	111.3 (4.38)	976.4 (38.42)
Average extreme snow depth cm (inches)	47.4 (18.7)	51.2 (20.2)	46.1 (18.1)	23.7 (9.3)	0.8 (0.3)	0 (0)	0 (0)	0 (0)	0 (0)	0 (0)	4.9 (1.9)	36.9 (14.5)	51.2 (20.2)
Average precipitation days	19.2	14.0	12.7	10.2	11.8	10.5	14.3	14.7	16.8	18.2	16.3	20.2	178.9
Source 1: SMHI Open Data(Temperature & Precipitation)
Source 2: SMHI Open Data(Snow Depth)

=== Hydrology ===
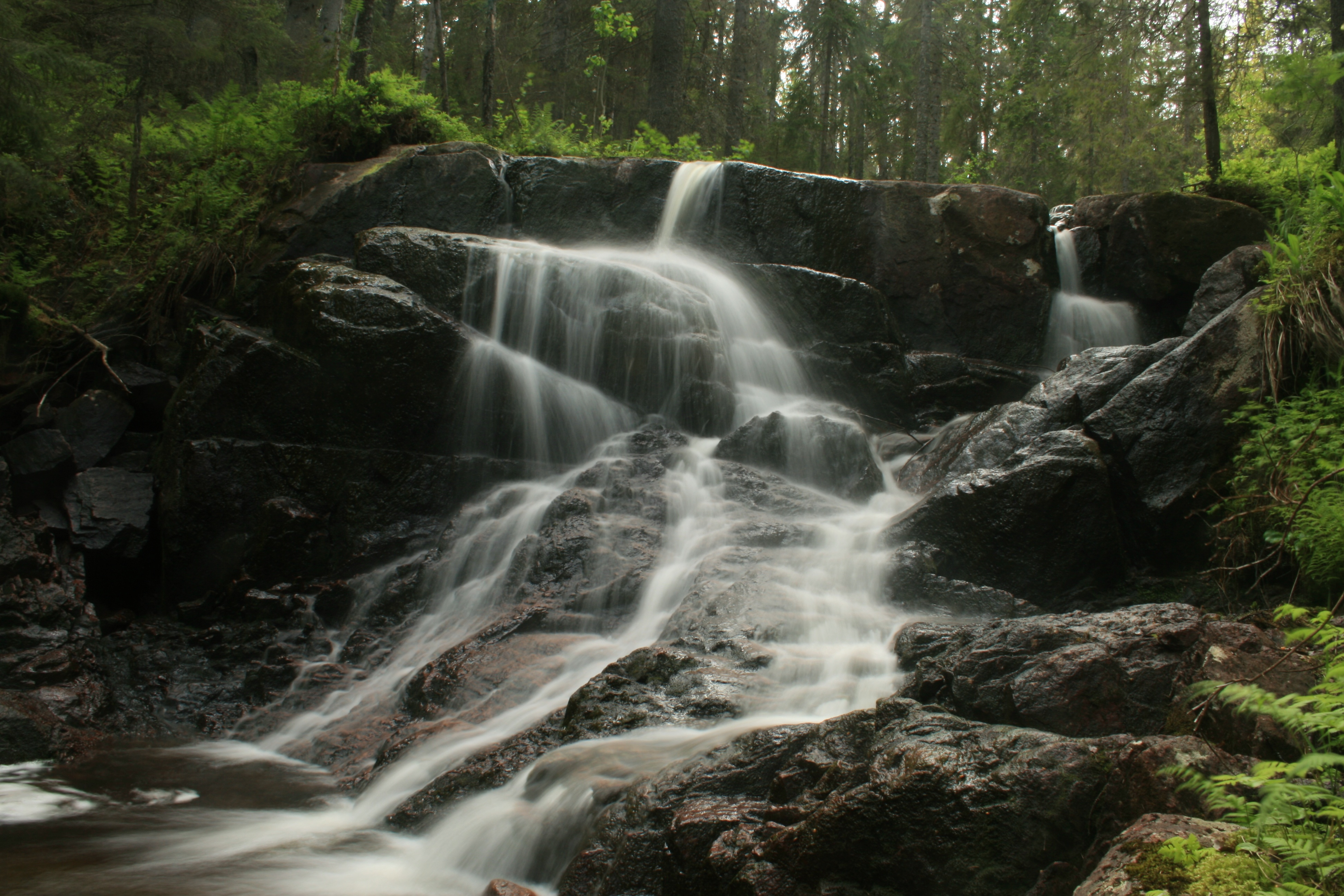
Small waterfall along the stream Skravelbäcken

Many streams run through the park, feeding many lakes. The principal lakes are Tärnättvattnen (7.9 hectares (20 acres)) and Stocksjön (6.1 hectares (15 acres)) belonging to the watershed of the streams Skravelbäcken and Långtjärnen (3.9 hectares (9.6 acres)), belonging to the watershed of the stream Nylandsbäcken. A non-negligible section of the park (125 hectares (310 acres)) is made up of fens.

== Geology ==
=== Bedrock ===
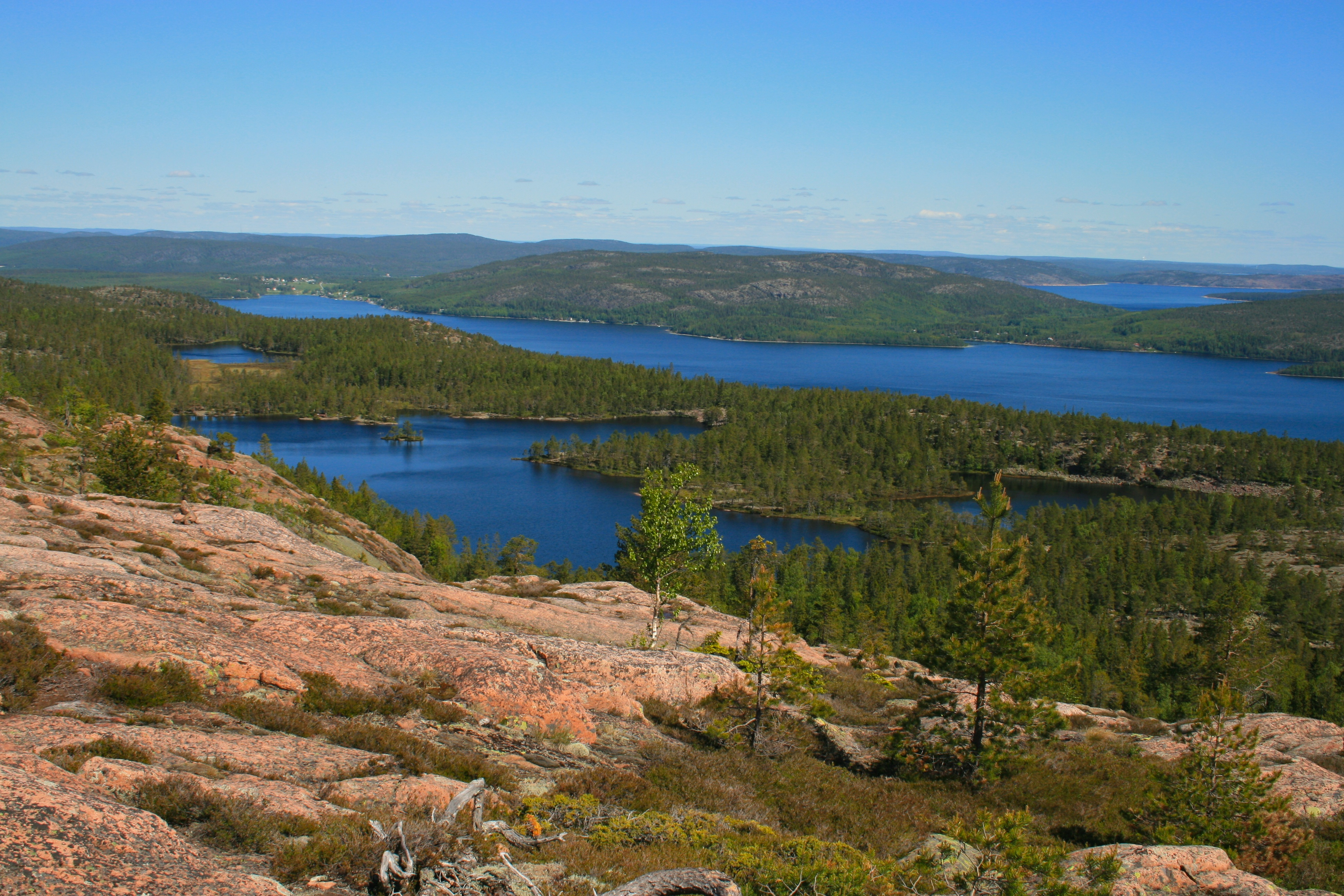
View from Slåttdalsberget. One can see clearly in the foreground the characteristic color of the granite of Nordingrå.

The principal rock of the park is the granite of Nordingrå, the park belonging to the Nordingrå massif. It consists of a rapakivi granite, formed about 1500 million years ago. It has a characteristic bright red color and erodes easily. To the north-east of the park, one can also find diabase, which was formed 1200 million years ago in the faults of the Nordingrå massif. Since granite forms a substrate very poor in nutrients, the diabase constitutes by contrast a very fertile terrain, which permits a richer vegetation.

The national park is traversed by several faults, like the rest of the High Coast. These faults were filled by deposits which marine erosion sometimes later removed. One of the most impressive examples of this phenomenon is Slåttdalsskrevan, east of the park : a crevasse of 40 metres (130 ft) depth and 200 metres (660 ft) width, which is one of the park's most visited sites. This crevasse was a fault filled by a vein of diabase, which was however eroded later, in part by the sea.

=== The High Coast ===
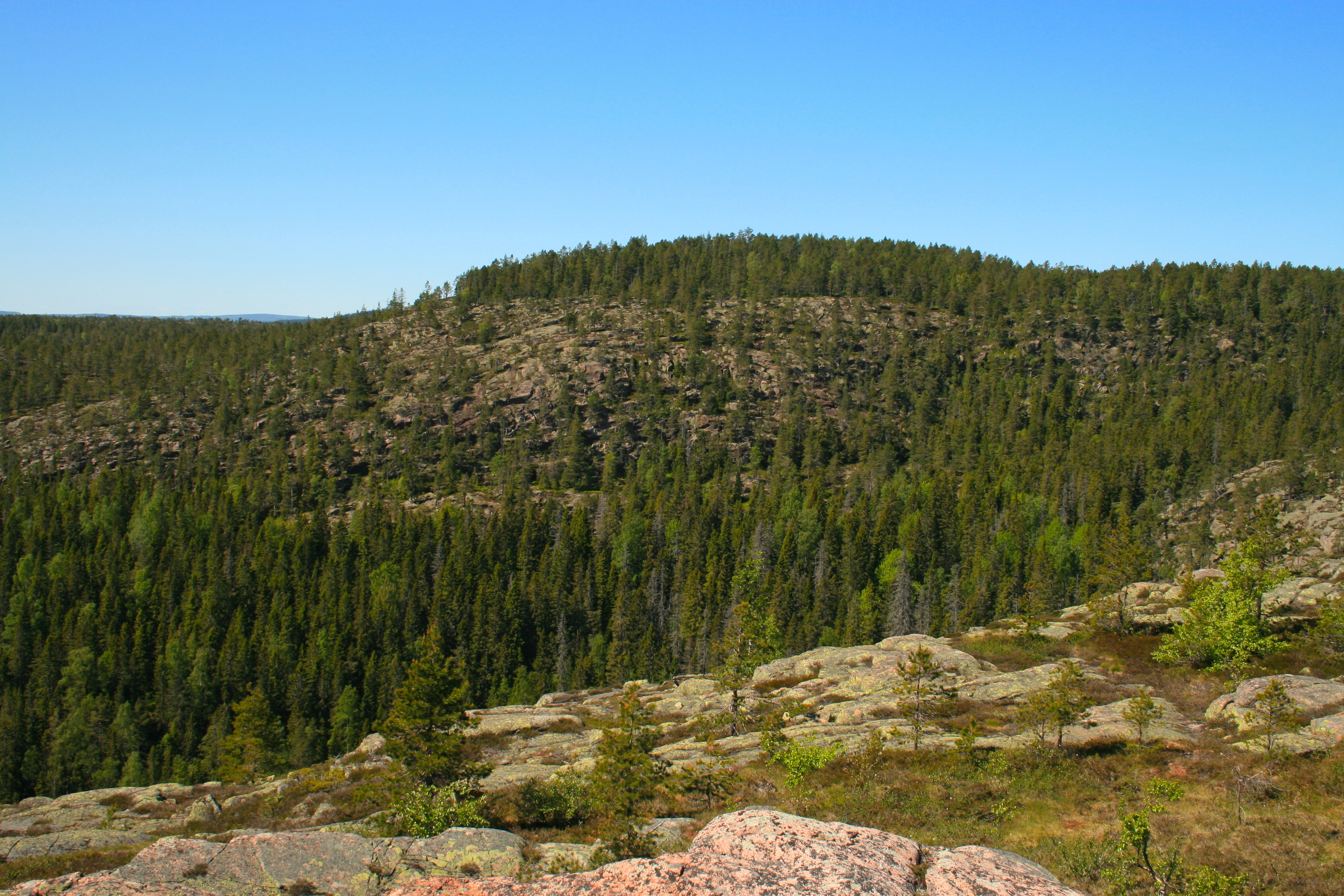
A Kalottberg (mountain with a forested peak) seen from Slåttdalsberget, one of the features of the post-glacial rebound

At the height of the last ice age, 20,000 years ago, the ice sheet, which covered all of Northern Europe, had its center in the sea near the High Coast. The ice's thickness attained 3 kilometres (1.9 mi), exerting significant pressure on the soil, which was thus situated 800 metres (2,600 ft) below the current level of the High Coast. When the ice melted, the soil rose progressively, a phenomenon called the post-glacial rebound, at a speed of 8 mm (0.31 in) per year. The zone was only freed of ice 9,600 years ago. As the land emerged from Lake Ancylus (ancestor of the Baltic Sea), the waves affected the terrain of today's park. The coastline of that era can now be found at an altitude of 285 metres (935 ft), measured from Skuleberget, southwest of the national park, which constitutes an absolute record. The peaks of the park were islands at that time. The ancient coastline is notably made visible by vegetation caps, which cover the areas not submerged after the retreat of the glaciers, explaining the name Kalottberg ("mountain cap") given to certain mountains of the region and the park. These vegetation caps had been able to install themselves since, at these places, the moraines were not eroded by waves, and they thus constituted a place where vegetation could attach.

The post-glacial rebound continues even today: the island of Tärnättholmarna, inside the park, is becoming bit by bit a peninsula, and the bay of Salsviken is now a lake isolated from the sea by a small strip of sand.

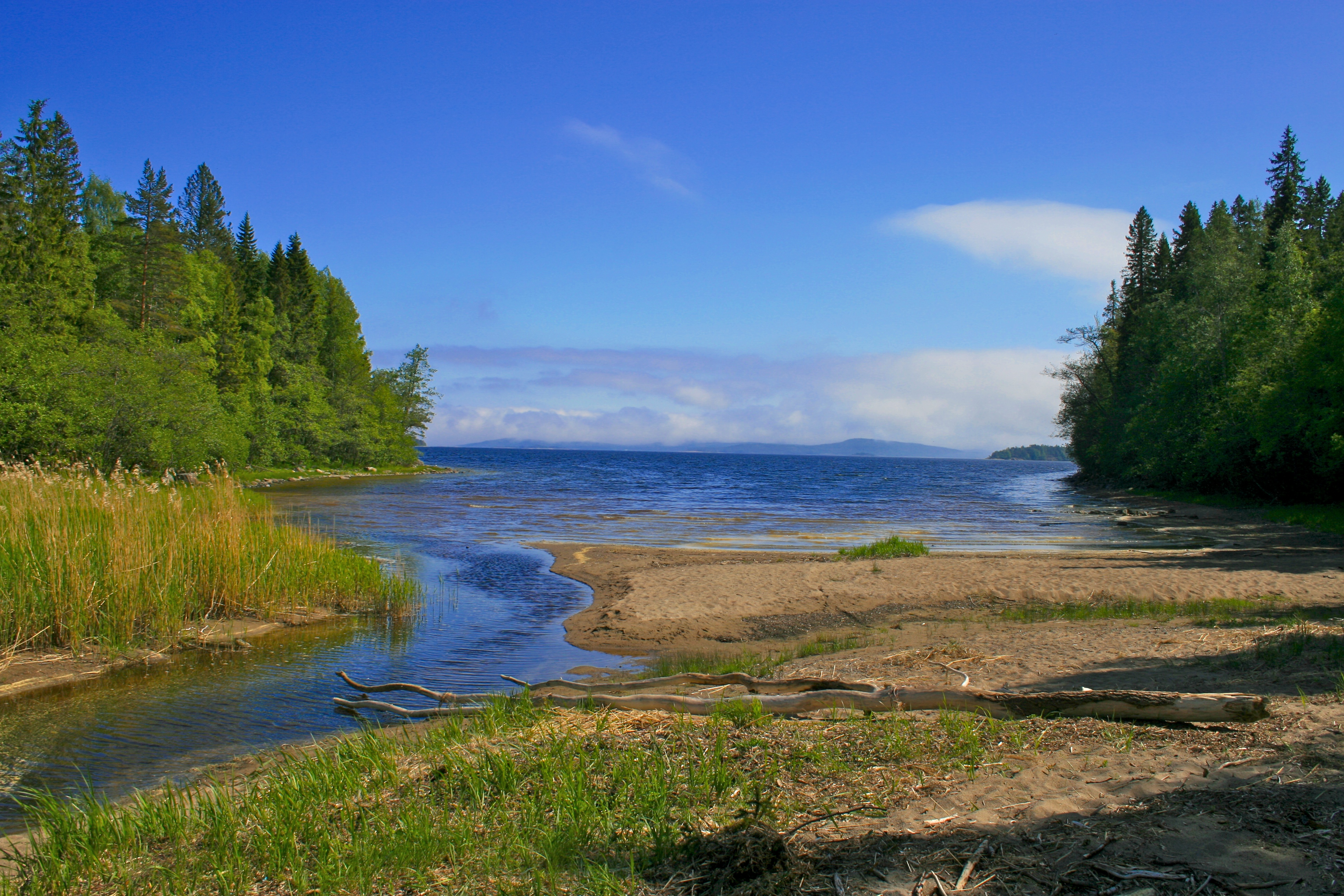
Sandy area separating the bay of Salsviken from the sea.

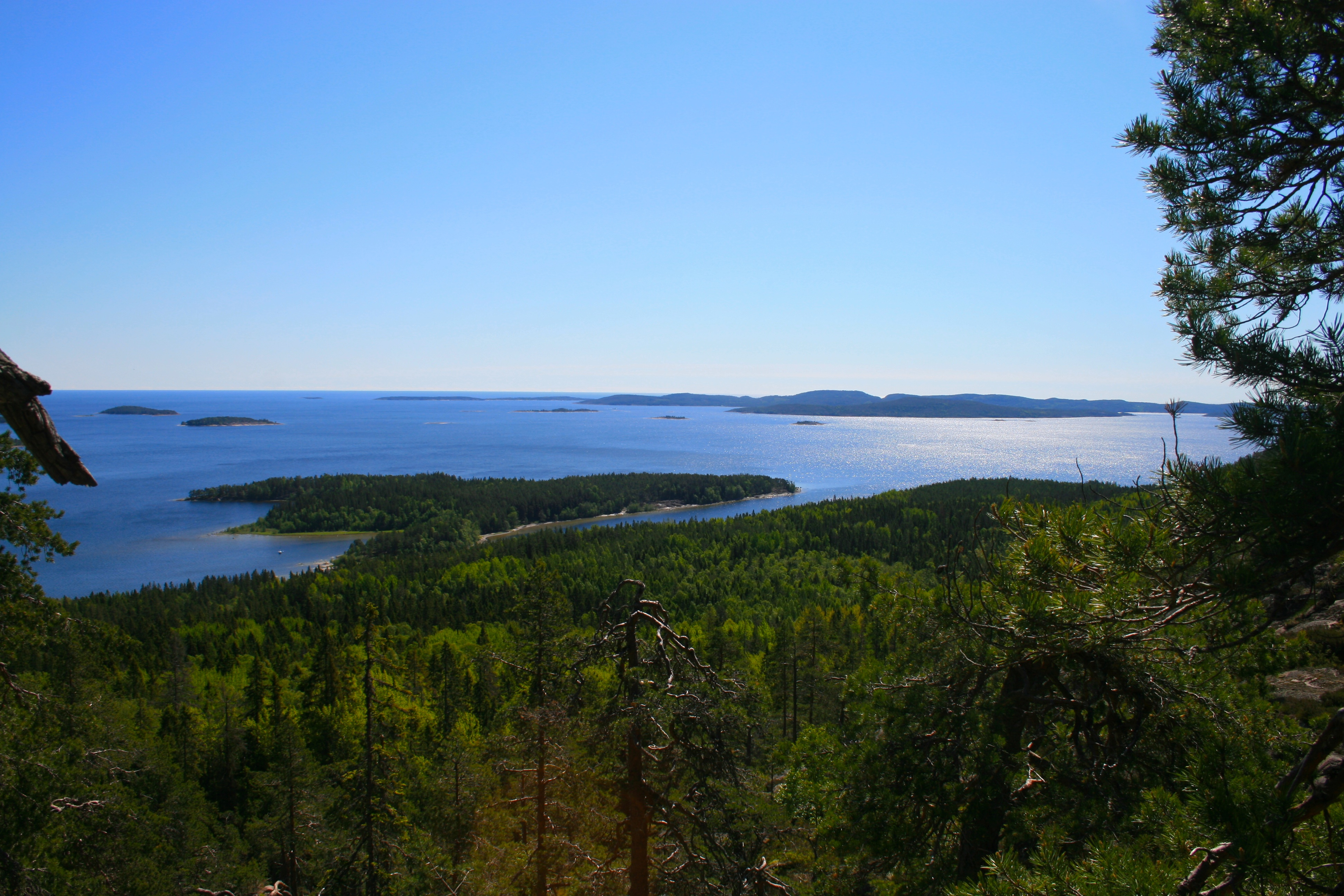
The islands of Tärnättholmarna, in the background, are now in fact peninsulas.

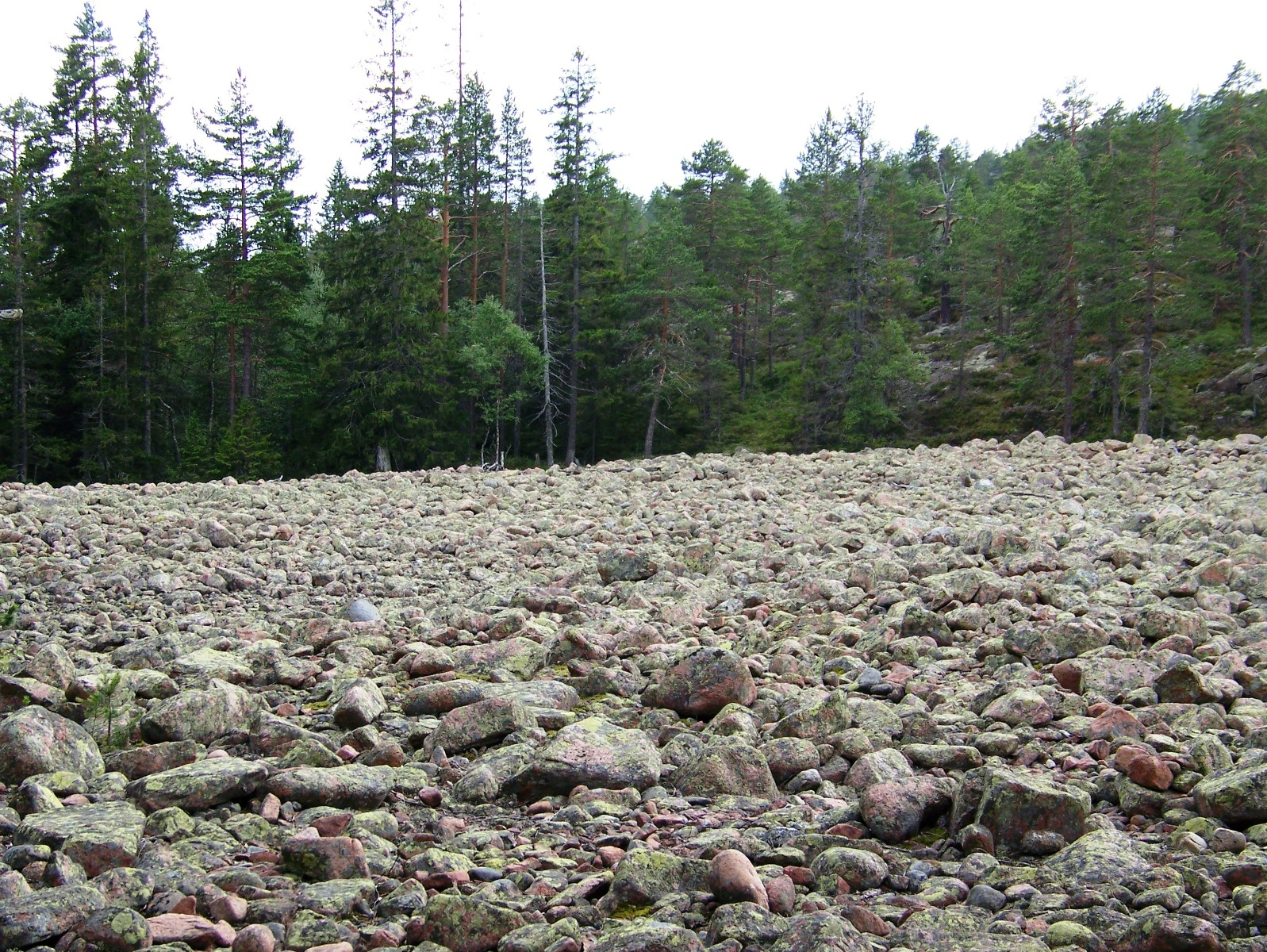
Rubble polished by waves before the post-glacial rebound lifted it out of the water.

== Environment ==
=== Fauna ===
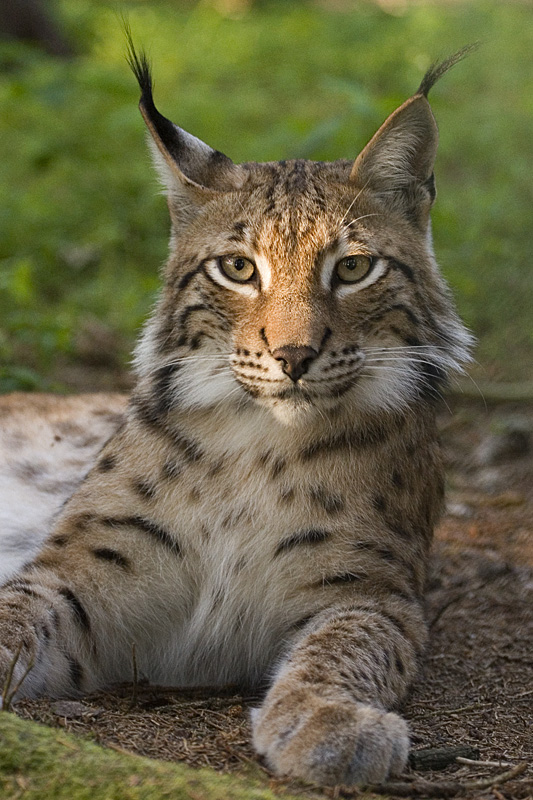
A Eurasian lynx

The park is home to many species of mammal characteristic to northern Sweden, in particular the Eurasian lynx (Lynx lynx) and the brown bear (Ursus arctos), considered endangered in the country. Besides these two species, one can find the red fox (Vulpes vulpes), the European badger (Meles meles), the European pine marten (Martes martes), the moose (Alces alces), the Eurasian beaver (Castor fiber), the grey seal (Halichoerus grypus), and the muskrat (Ondatra zibethicus). One can also find small mammals, such as the Eurasian red squirrel (Sciurus vulgaris), the American mink (Neogale vison) and the stoat (Mustela erminea). The territory of the lynx is much more vast than the park itself, which is therefore not sufficient to protect these animals. Indeed, the population of lynx in the region is decreasing, probably because of habitat fragmentation as a result of European route E4.

With respect to birds, many species are also on the endangered list in Sweden, such as the Siberian jay (Perisoreus infaustus), the three-toed woodpecker (Picoides tridactylus), the red-throated loon (Gavia stellata), the European honey buzzard (Pernis apivorus), the rough-legged buzzard (Buteo lagopus), the greenish warbler (Phylloscopus trochiloides), the red-breasted flycatcher (Ficedula parva), the red-backed shrike (Lanius collurio), the spotted nutcracker (Nucifraga caryocatactes), the common rosefinch (Carpodacus erythrinus), and the ortolan bunting (Emberiza hortulana). The park also houses important populations of grey-headed woodpeckers (Picus canus), common cranes (Grus grus), grey herons (Ardea cinerea), Eurasian wrens (Troglodytes troglodytes), Eurasian wrynecks (Jynx torquilla), and hazel grouse (Tetrastes bonasia).

The rivers and lakes of the park are relatively poor. They are home mainly to European perch (Perca fluviatilis) and brown trout (Salmo trutta), but the stream Skravelbäcken is also home to brook trout (Salvelinus fontinalis). The sea has Atlantic herring (Clupea harengus), but also northern pike (Esox lucius), trout, and perch, the Baltic Sea having low salinity.

Little is known of the park's insects. It is the zone most rich in beetles in the county.

=== Flora ===
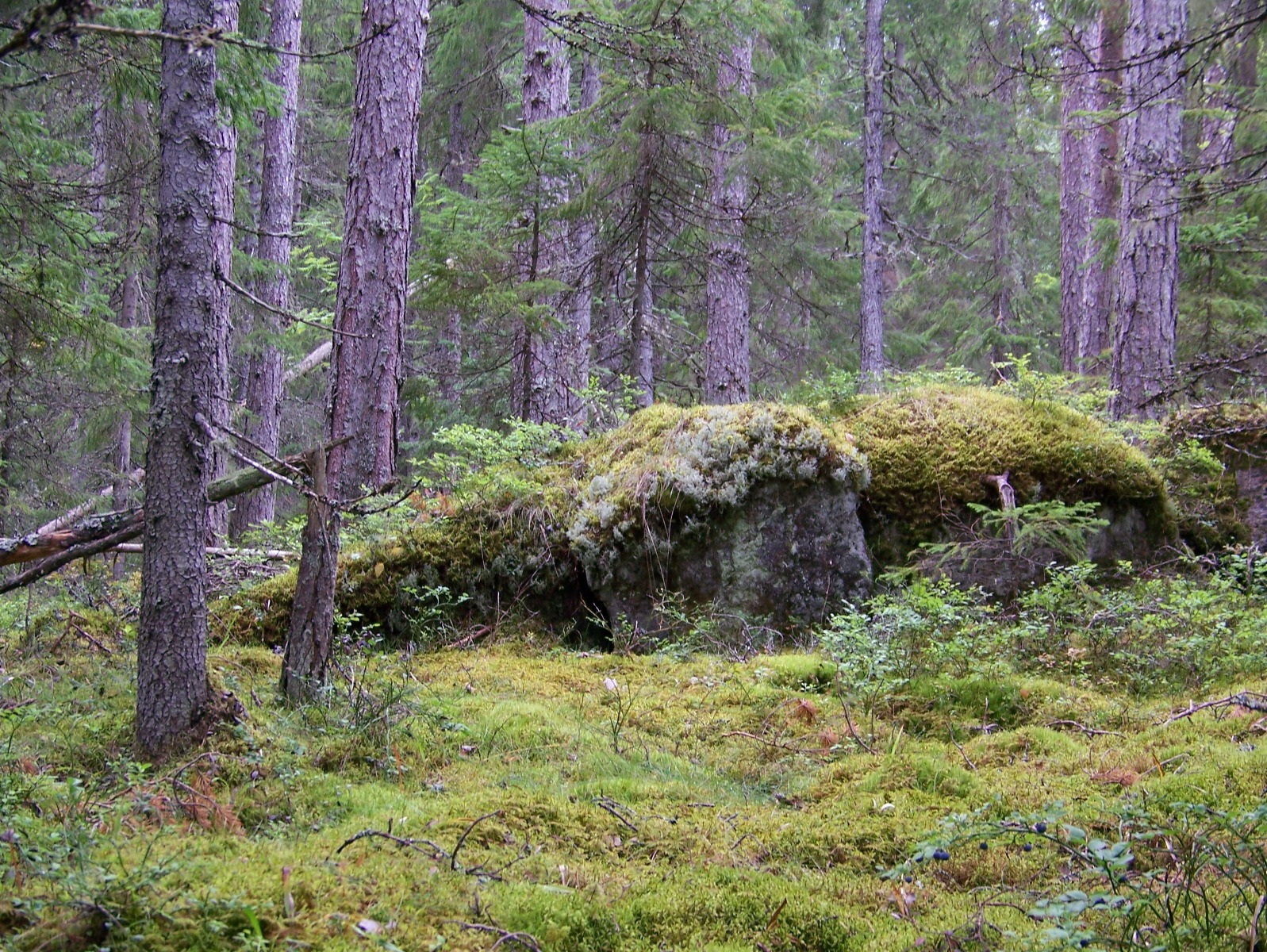
The park's forest

Skuleskogen is located on the northern border of the range of several plant species. Thus several deciduous tree species are present in the park, such as the little-leaf linden (Tilia cordata), the common hazel (Corylus avellana), the guelder-rose (Viburnum opulus), and the Norway maple (Acer platanoides). The presence of these species is considered more of a relic of a warmer era than a feature of the current times. Their survival has been rendered possible by the unusual conditions encountered at the foot of certain mountains called Sydväxtberg (literally "mountain of southern-like vegetation"): the orientation of the rock face to the sun and the humidity brought about by the mountain offer a favorable microclimate which, in conjunction with the fertile soil, permits plants which do not normally grow at so high a latitude to thrive.

However, deciduous forest only covers 42 hectares (100 acres), barely more than 1.4% of the surface area of the park. Thus, the forest is principally coniferous forest, characteristic of the Scandinavian and Russian taiga ecoregion. This forest is mainly made up of Norway spruce (Picea abies), but at the frontier with the barren zones, the main species is Scots pine (Pinus sylvestris). Pines dominate because forest fires are less frequent than previously, since birch and Scots pine are the first species to return after a fire. It seems that fires occurred naturally over the ages, but there has not been a fire for two centuries, humans actively fighting against their propagation. The maximum age of the trees of the forest is 100 years, but certain pines have reached 500 years, being particularly inaccessible and thus spared by loggers. However, during the last 100 years, the forest has partially recovered the richness which characterizes old growth forests.

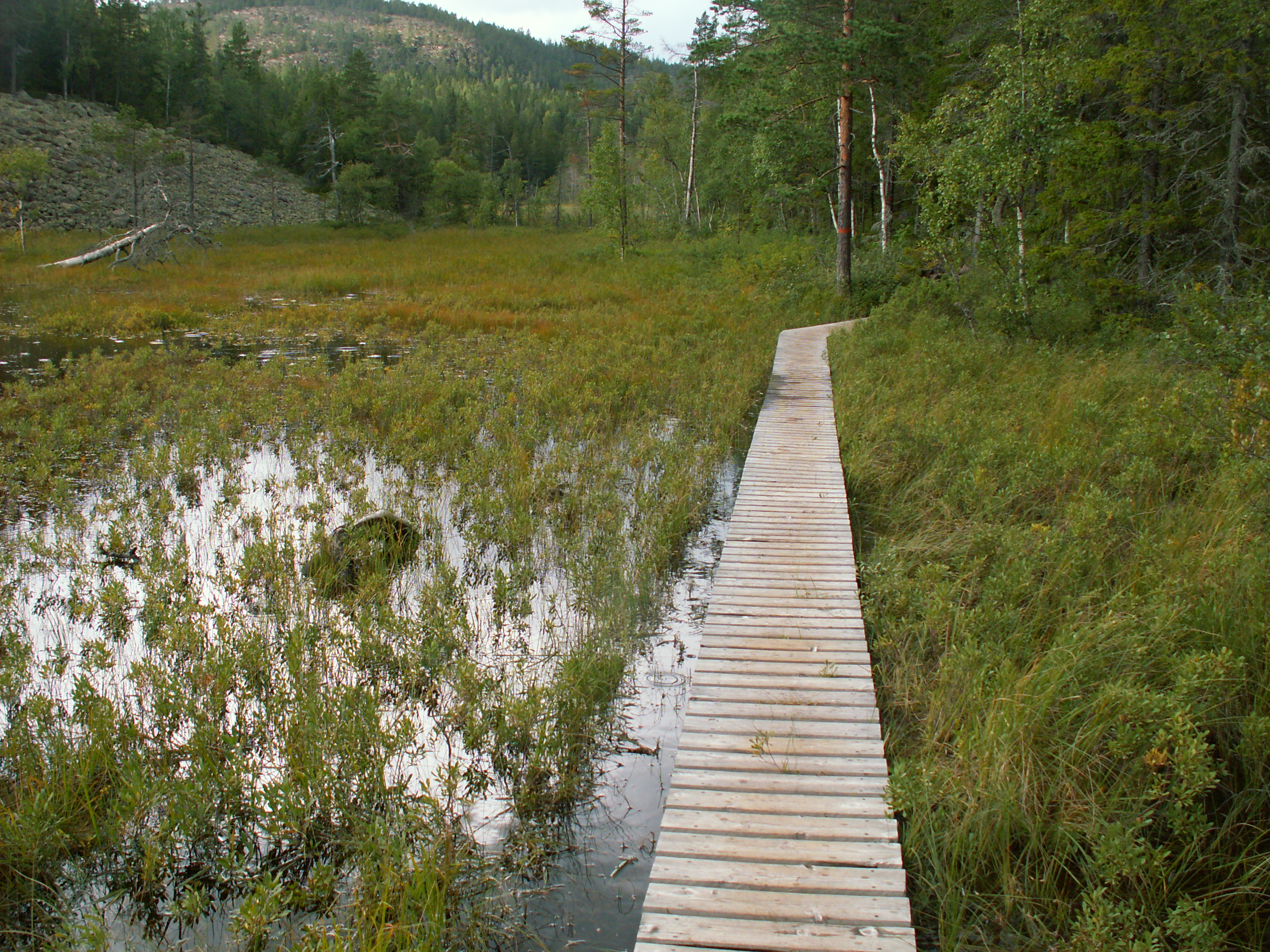
A wetland in the park

In the coniferous forests, one can find several shrubs, of which the most common are blue whortleberry (Vaccinium myrtillus), lingonberry (Vaccinium vitis-idaea), Melampyrum sylvaticum and woundwort (Solidago virgaurea). In the richer soil, one can also find Hepatica nobilis, Alpine blue-sow-thistle (Cicerbita alpina), wall lettuce (Mycelis muralis), as well as several species of ferns, such as worm fern (Dryopteris filix-mas) et la common lady-fern (Athyrium filix-femina).

A large part of the park (36%) consists of naked rock, and is thus a poor substrate for vegetation. The principal trees are dwarf pines which have not been affected by logging and which thus can be up to 500 years old. Besides these small trees, the vegetation is almost wholly of a shrubby nature, with common heather (Calluna vulgaris), common juniper (Juniperus communis), or bearberry (Arctostaphylos uva-ursi). These zones are also home to a large number of species of mosses and lichens.

Many mosses and lichens of the park are considered endangered in Sweden, in particular Dolichousnea longissima, which is now the park's symbol.

== History ==
=== Protohistory ===
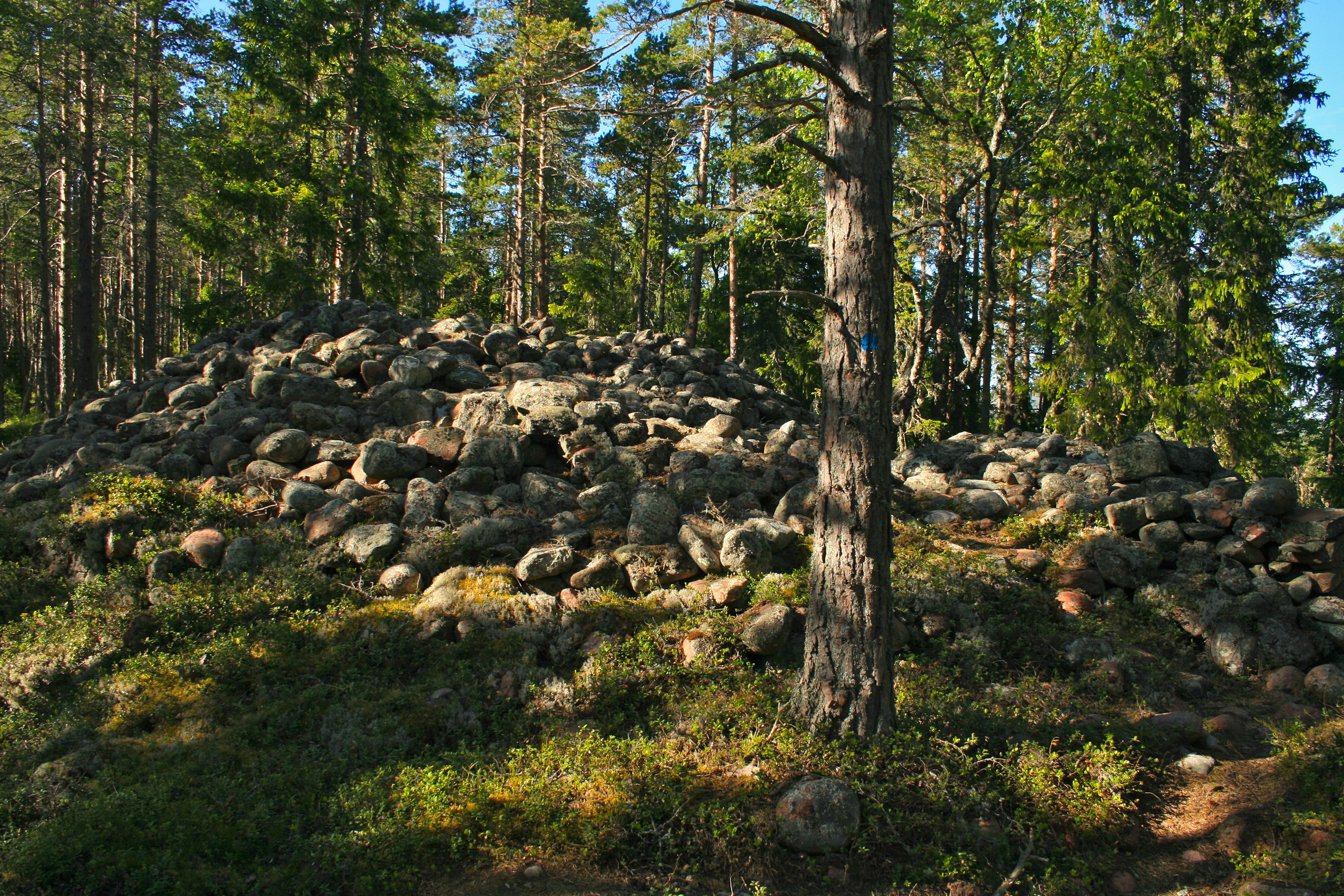
Bronze Age cairn in Skuleskogen National Park, near Näskebodarna

Because of the topography and the nature of the terrain, the area did not lend itself to human settlement and no trace of permanent habitation had been found in the park. Some traces of habitation dating from the Stone Age were found 10 kilometres (6.2 mi) northwest of the park, at Bjästamon. These habitations were probably maintained until the Bronze Age. During the Bronze Age, many funerary cairns were placed along the coast as it existed at that time: one can find 28 inside the park, as well as two megalithic monuments. Many of these cairns, often circular, have in their centers lone rectangular cists. All these monuments are now 35 to 40 metres (130 ft) above the current sea level. Just southwest of Näskebodarna, a dozen of these cairns, some of them relatively imposing, are arranged into a kind of cemetery; the reason for this arrangement is unknown: it probably has to do with marking the territory or showing the way to the village, probably situated in the bays to the north or south of the park. One supposes indeed that at that time, navigation by boat was already developed and the sea was an essential resource for the settlers.

No traces dating from the Iron Age have been discovered.

=== Exploitation of the park ===
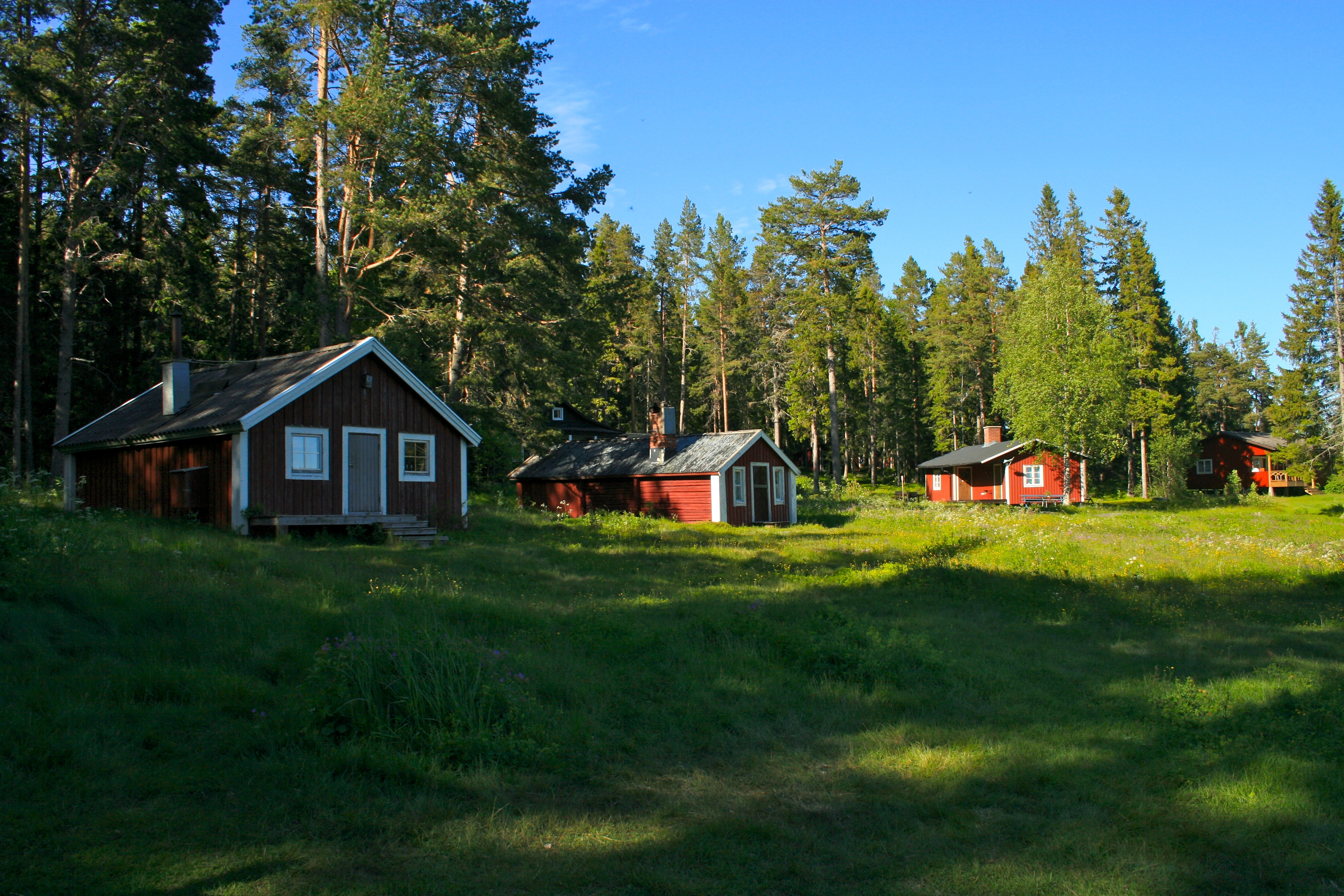
The old summer pastures of Näskebodarna

The forest of Skule has always been a topographic barrier. For example, it would have perhaps have been the northern frontier of the kingdom of Svealand before the year 1000, and thus the border between adjacent municipalities and parishes. The villages it separated had very limited contact with each other and, because of the poor agricultural potential of the forest, there was never a permanent settlement in the forest. The forest was, however, traversed by a trail, which later took the name of Kustlandsvägen and which corresponded roughly to the path of today's European route E4. For a long time, this path constituted the only road to the north of the country. The zone was thus the property of the Swedish crown, which could decide who could use the forest as pasture or engage in logging there. In the 17th century, unlike many of the northern Swedish forests belonging to the crown, Skuleskogen did not see any colonization by the Forest Finns (Skogsfinnar), and thus did not undergo slash-and-burn cultivation techniques. The forest was instead used as a summer pasture (transhumance), and the hay of the marshes was used as well, although in a very localized fashion. As a result, in today's national park there were four summer pasture cottages, three having existed up until the turn of the 20th century, while the last (Näskebodarna) remained active up until the end of World War II. This last is now used, maintained in its old state, for tourism. The forest would seem to be more open in those days than now.

At the same time, it would seem that the Sami were using the mountains as a winter pasture for their reindeer until 1919. They would pass the summer in the mountains of Jämtland, and would travel to the coast between November and April.

After the Great Northern War at the beginning of the 18th century, Sweden encouraged the foundation of villages on its territories by tax exemptions. As a result, a few isolated villages were established in the forest of Skuleskogen, but none in today's park. Until the middle of the 18th century, logging was limited to the area directly around the villages and thus only minimally affected the forest of the park. But that soon changed, the state taking an active part in the exploitation of the forest. Logging became the principal activity in the area of the park. In a few years, a dozen mills, including a steam mill, were constructed in immediate proximity to today's park. The sawmills driven by water wheels only had weak capacities in general and only functioned during certain periods of the year. The number of steam mills grew thereafter. At first, only the trees with trunks over a fixed length in diameter were able to be cut, but bit by bit, these rules changed, and in the end all the trees were able to be felled. Logging slowed down markedly at the turn of the century, allowing the forest to regenerate. About 15% of the forest was affected by a new period of exploitation before the protection of the area. The forest's oldest trees therefore date from the start of the 20th century.

=== Protection ===
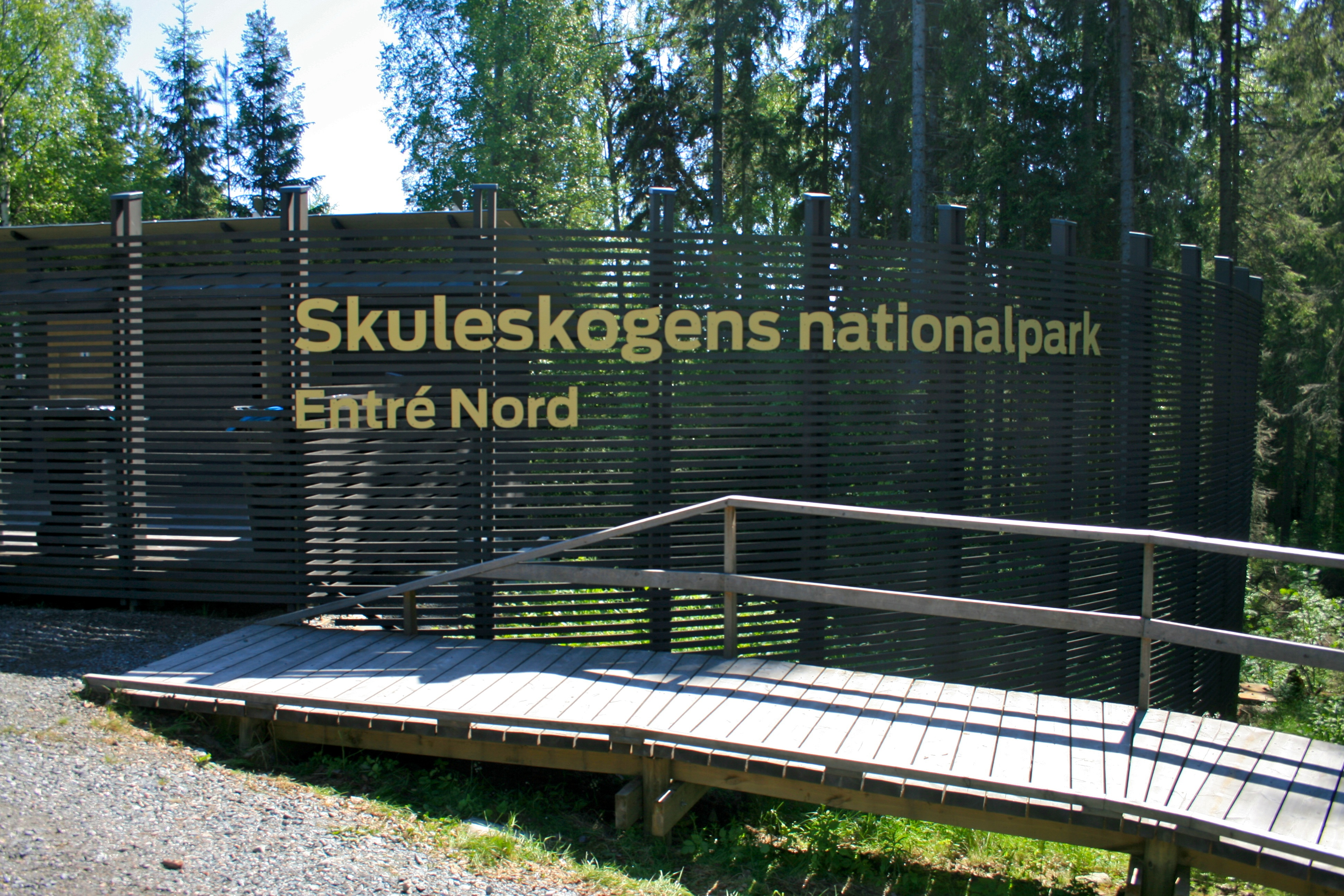
The park's north entrance, opened in 2010

Upon a great inventory of the environment of the county in the middle of the 1960s, Skuleskogen was noticed for its great natural value. So, in 1968, it was decided to protect a part of the massif. In 1971, the management plan for the territories of Sweden resulted in the High Coast being classified as a zone of national interest, and next in 1974, a part of the zone was classified as a temporary nature reserve. However, conflict arose between the land owners and the authorities of nature protection, the latter maintaining that no exploitation of the forest could occur and that the zone ought to be classified as a national park. To accomplish this the terrain would have had to be purchased by the state, but the land owners did not accept the deal that they would be given equivalent areas of forest nearby. However, the NCB company, which owned about 70% of the land, was in great financial difficulty and had to sell its land; the state was therefore able to buy the lands inside the proposed park, as well as some surrounding land, to compensate the other land owners. The county therefore proposed in 1978 the creation of a natural park to Naturvårdsverket which transmitted the proposal the following year to the government. The decision was not, however, made, because some parts of the proposed park were still privately owned. The zone was classified as a result only as a nature reserve in 1979.

The creation of the national park took place in May 1984. The official motive for the creation of the park was "to preserve a heavily deforested coastal landscape, of rocky terrain and fracture valleys, in a relatively intact state, where fauna and flora can develop freely. Negotiations for the purchase of the land could not be completed for certain properties, and the lands concerned remained therefore protected as a nature reserve. An area to the northwest of the park was added to the park in 1991, when it was discovered that an endangered species of lichen (Dolichousnea longissima) was growing there. In 1996, the area was included in the Natura 2000 Network, and in 2000, they park was important in the High Coast becoming a UNESCO World Heritage site. The area thus classified was extended by UNESCO in 2006 by the inclusion of the Finnish archipelago of Kvarken, the entire zone henceforth being called Archipelago of Kvarken/High Coast. In 2009, the park was again expanded by the addition to the northwest and south of land from the nature reserve of Skuleskogen.

== Management and administration ==
Like most of the national parks of Sweden, management and administration are divided between the Swedish environmental protection agency (Naturvårdsverket) and the administrative council of the Swedish counties (Länsstyrelse). Naturvårdsverket is responsible for proposing new national parks, upon consulting with the councils of administration of the counties and municipalities; their creation is endorsed by a vote of the Swedish parliament. The state then purchases the land, through the intermediary of Naturvårdsverket. The management of the park is then principally the responsibility of the county; in the case of Skuleskogen, this means the administrative council of the county of Västernorrland.

The park is divided into three zones, each having a purpose, in order to reconcile the protection of the park and the welcoming of tourists. The majority (65%) of the park is classified as zone I, that is, as a low-activity zone: this space is the heart of the park and has scarce tourism infrastructure, so that the environment remains intact. The eastern third of the park is classified as zone II, the high-activity zone. In this zone you can find most of the trails and cabins, as well as the most popular sites. Finally, a very small part (150 hectares (370 acres)) is classified zone III, being that zone in immediate proximity to the entrances. This zone can accommodate a great number of visitors before channeling them towards the main trails.

== Tourism ==
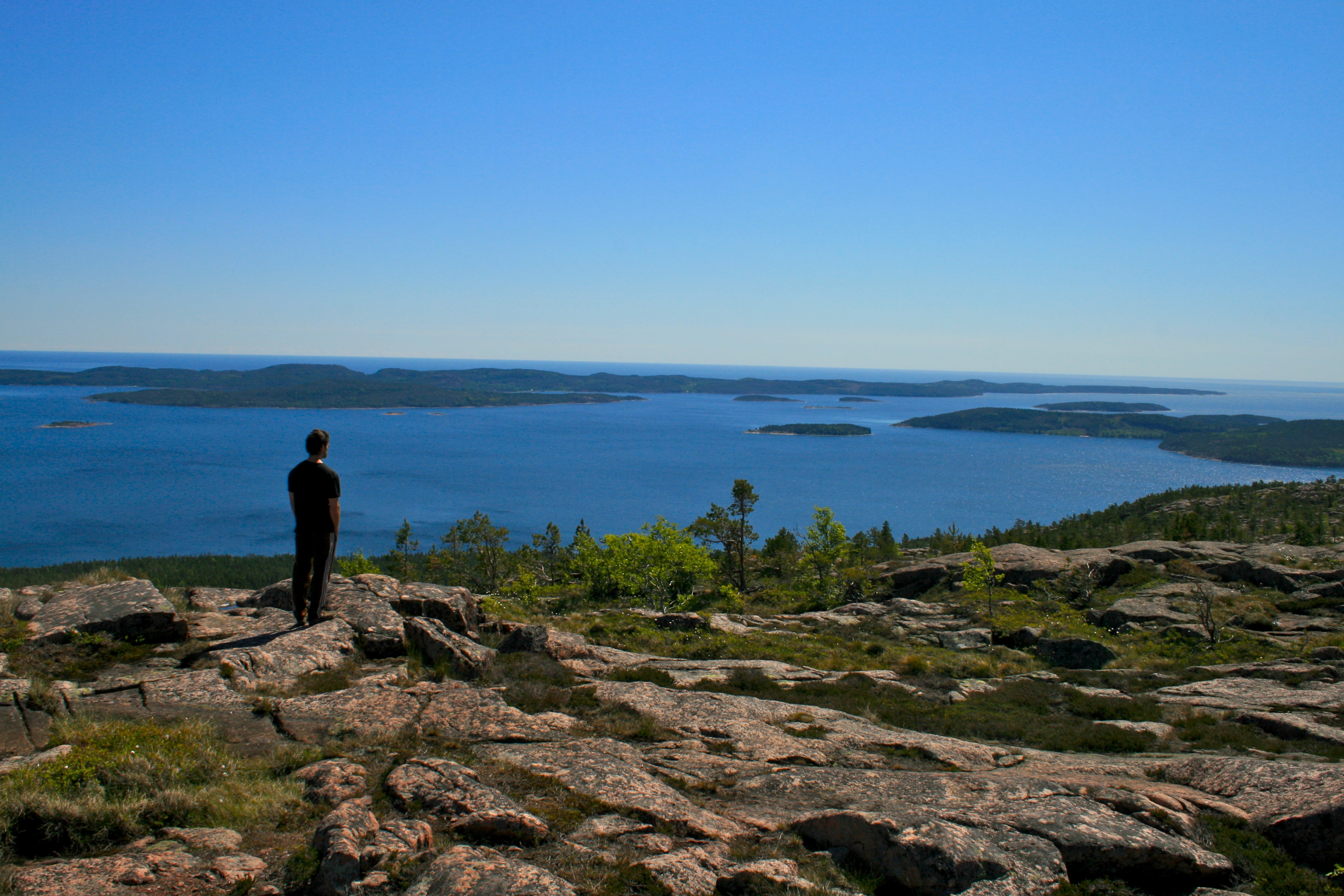
View of the archipelago from Slåttdalsberget

The park is very accessible and its location at the heart of the High Coast, a UNESCO World Heritage site, earns it 20,000 visitors a year, which is relatively large, given its location in Norrland.

The park has three entrances, one each to the north, south, and west, the north entrance being the main one. The three entrances are near European route E4, which is the main road in northern Sweden, and which traverses the country from end to end. Near these entrances one can find parking and information panels about the park. It is possible to spend the night in the park in one of five shelters (Norrsvedjebodarna, Tärnettvattnen, Tärnettholmarna, Tärnettsundet, and Näskebodarna). These were private homes before the foundation of the park. It is also possible to go camping in the dedicated campgrounds.

Many hiking trails run through the park, especially through its easternmost third. In particular, the grand hiking trail Höga Kustenleden (the trail through the High Coast) traverses the park from north to south over 8.7 kilometres (5.4 mi). This trail can moreover constitute a means of accessing the park from the villages of Docksta and Bjästa, which are themselves accessible by public transport. (Note: p. 103) Besides by hiking, it is also possible to discover the park by skiing in winter; its topology even permits alpine skiing. (Note: p. 107) It is also possible to go kayaking along the coast and to go swimming, in particular at the sandy beaches of Tärnättholmarna or in the lagoon of Salsviken to the north, where the water can attain warmer temperatures. (Note: p. 111) Biking is allowed on the trail along the coast.

The most visited site in the park is probably the crevasse of Slåttdalsskrevan, but also popular are the view from over the archipelago from the nearby summit of Slåttdalsberget, as well as the Bronze Age funerary cairns.

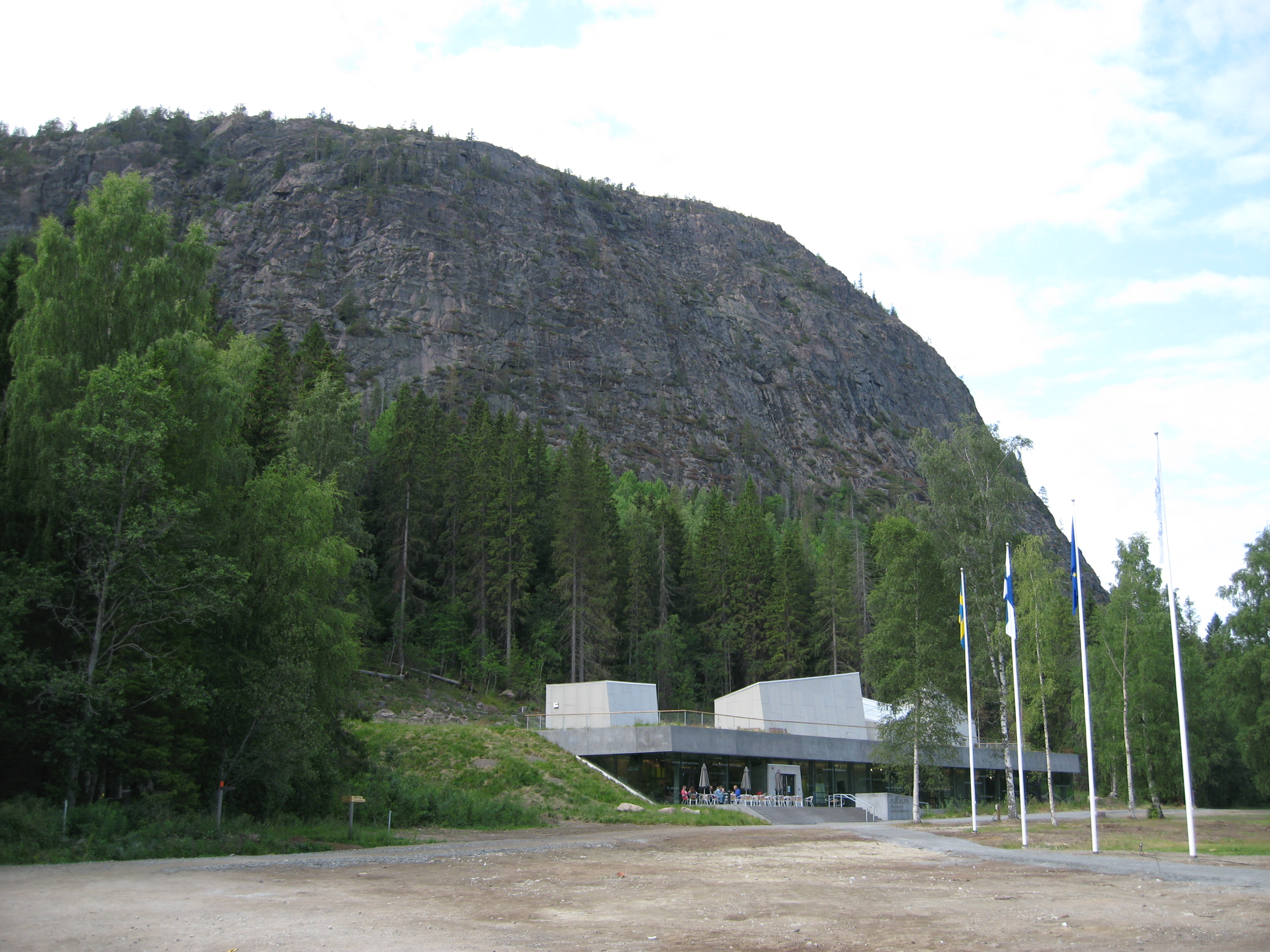
The naturum Höga kusten houses permanent exhibits on the High Coast.

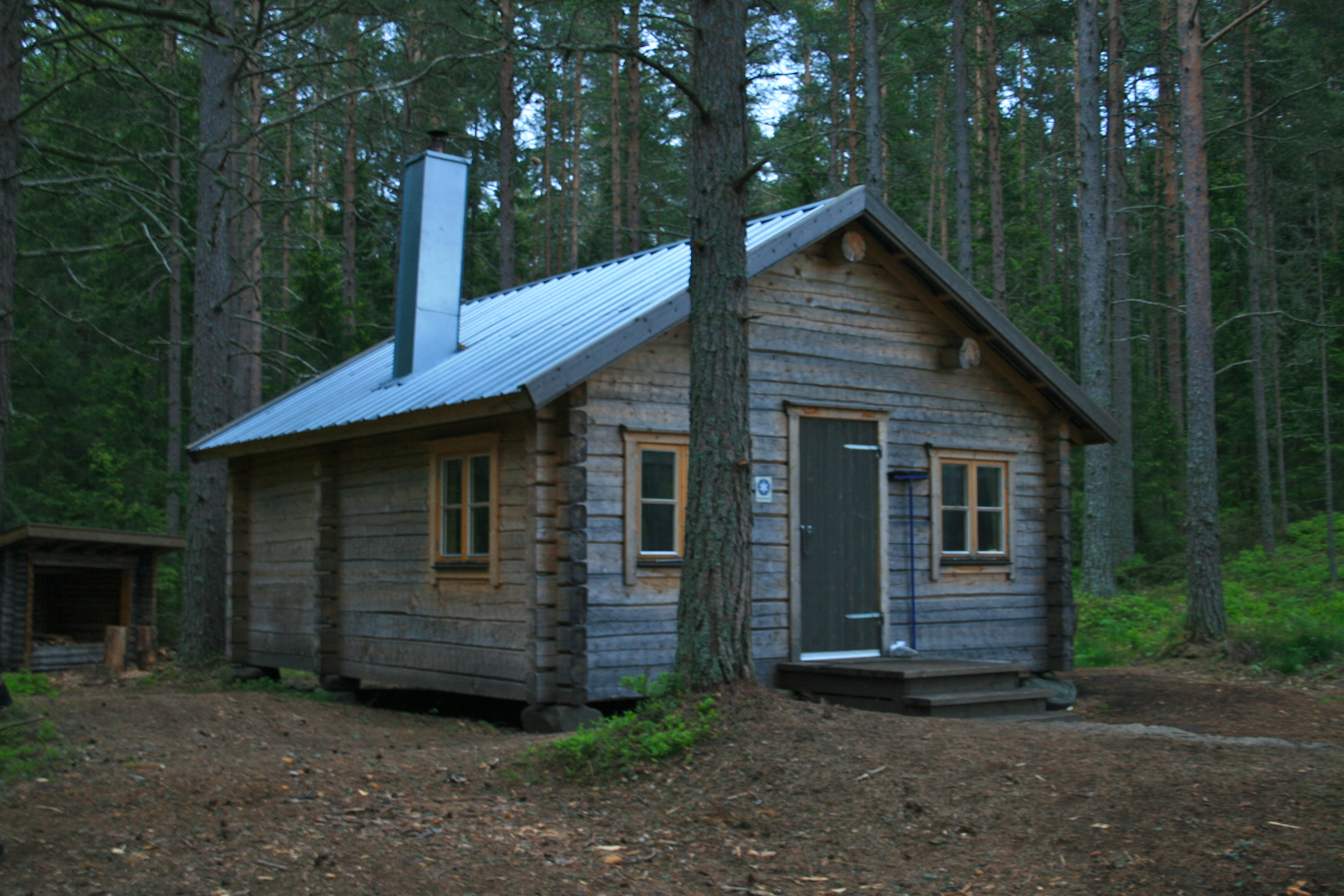
The cabin of Tärnättholmarna.

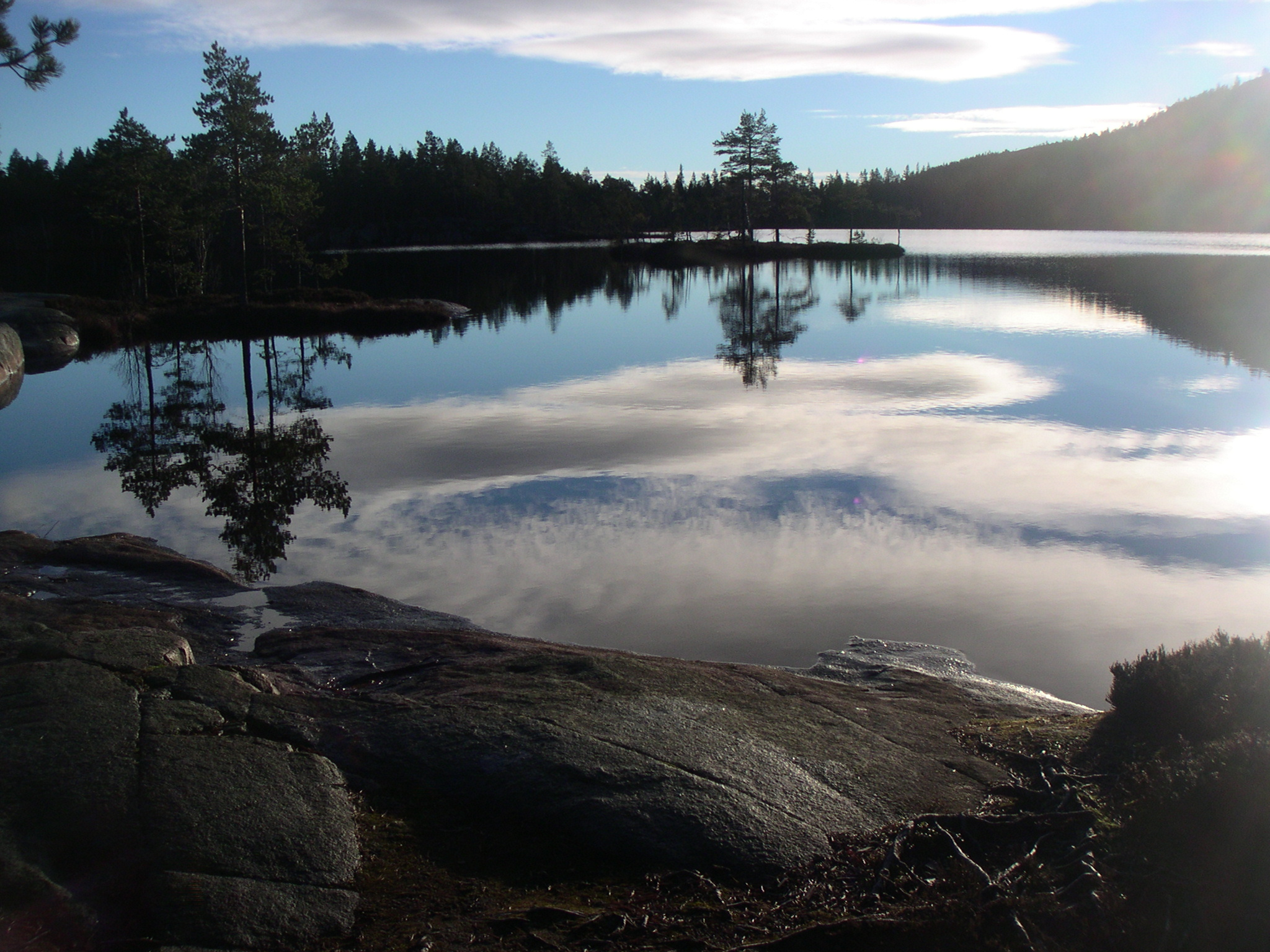
Tärnetvattnen

== Skuleskogen in popular culture ==
Skuleskogen is the setting of the novel The brigands of the forest of Skule (Rövarna i Skuleskogen) by Kerstin Ekman. The book tells the story of Skord, a troll of human appearance from the forest of Skule. His curiosity about humans leads him into numerous adventures across the ages (he is immortal). The title references a local legend, that robbers arrived in the area in the 7th century, but were rejected by the villagers of the area. They had to take refuge in the cave Skulegrottan not far from the park. These brigands committed numerous misdeeds, attacking those who crossed the forest. They ended up getting done in by a young peasant who succeeded in joining their group by saying that the villagers had rejected him too.

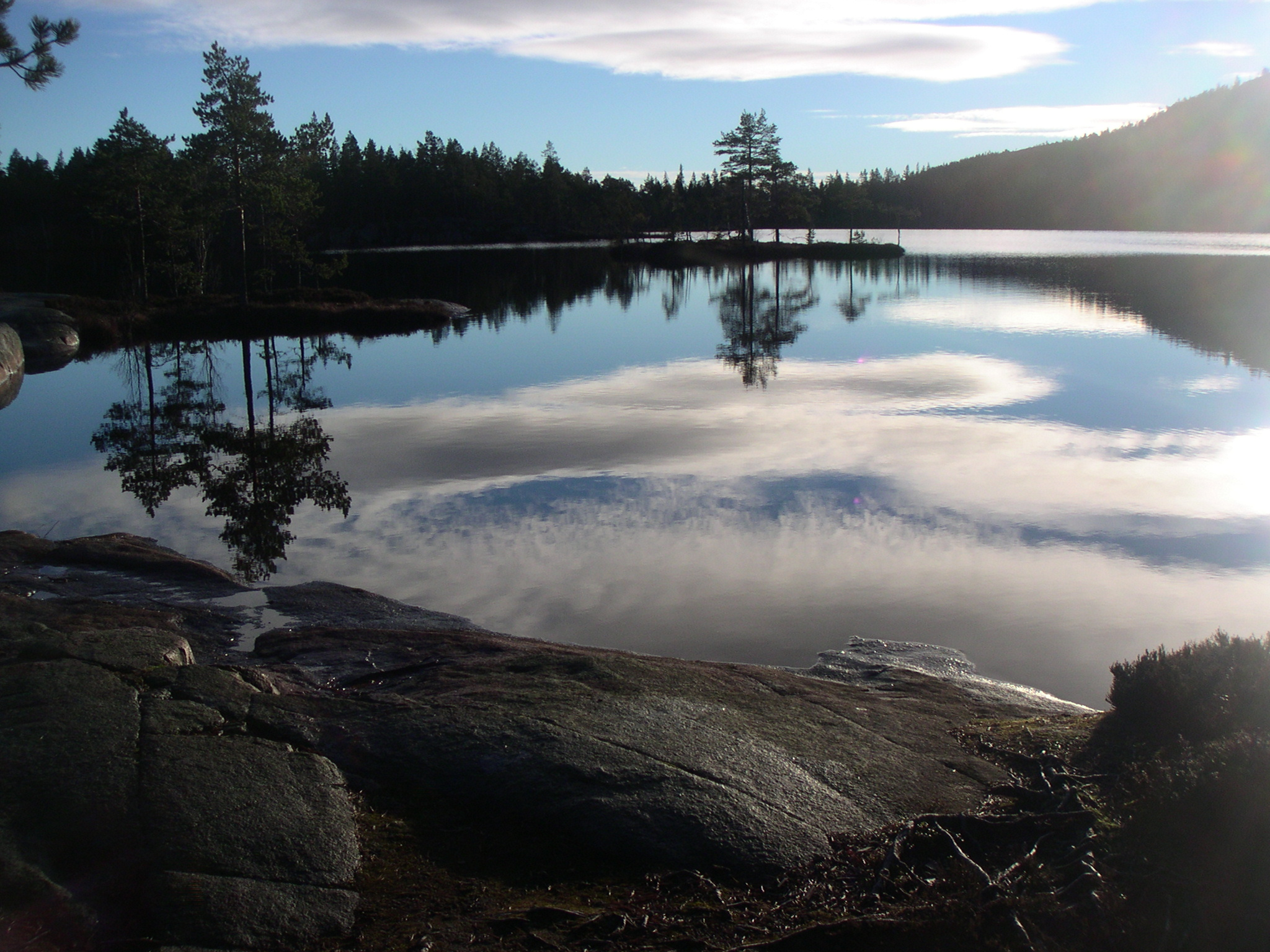
Tärnetvattnet

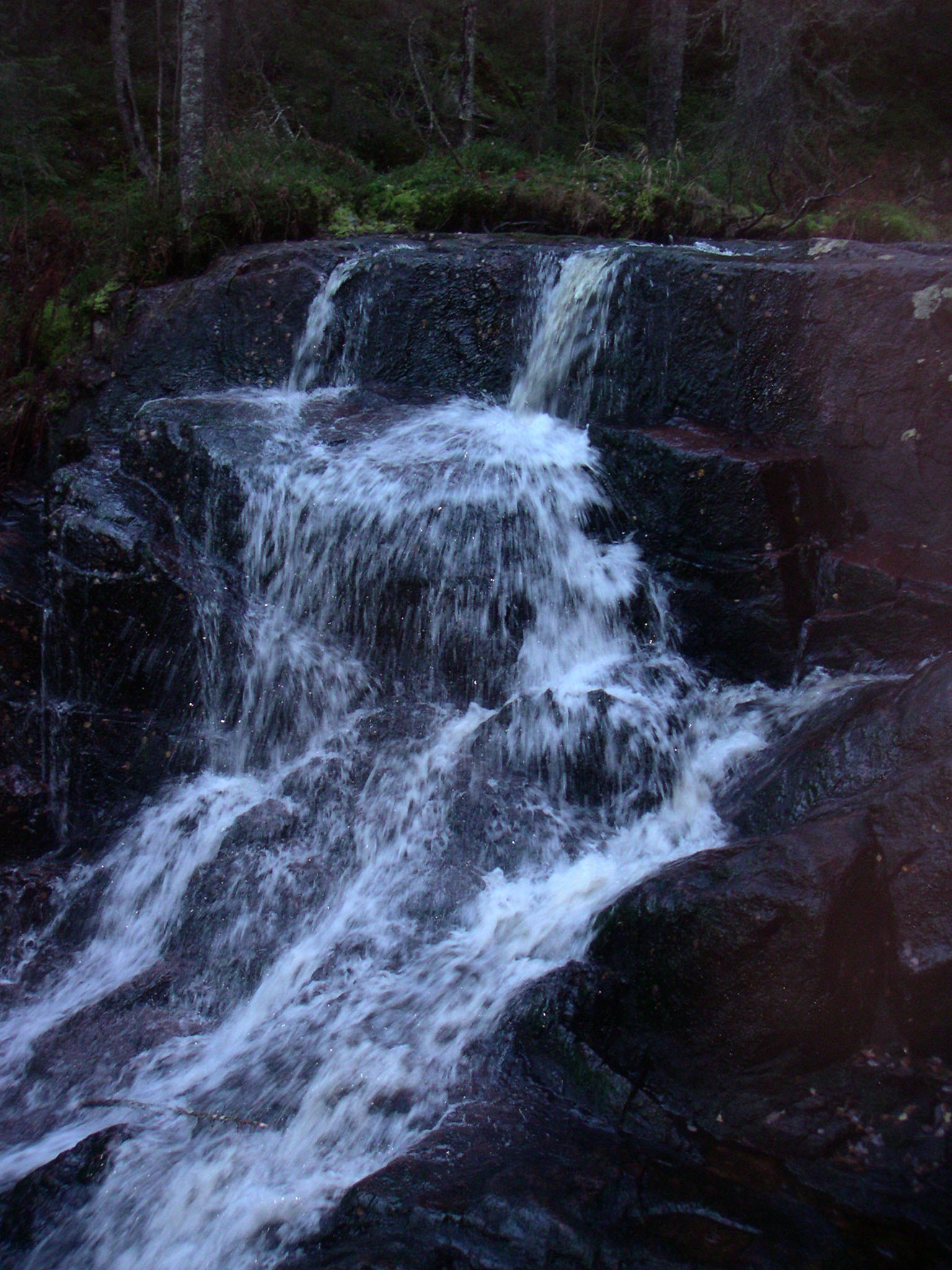
Skravelbäcken

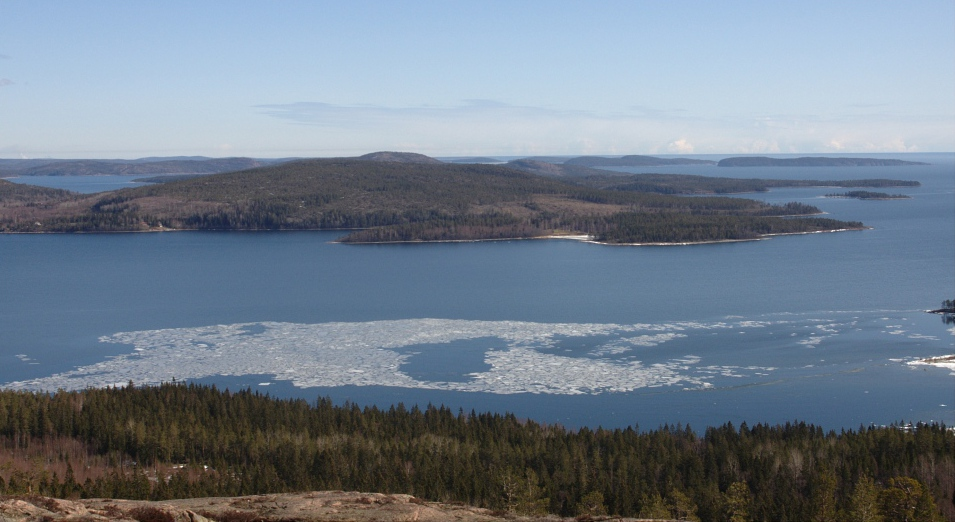
View over the Gulf of Bottnia from Slottdalsberget

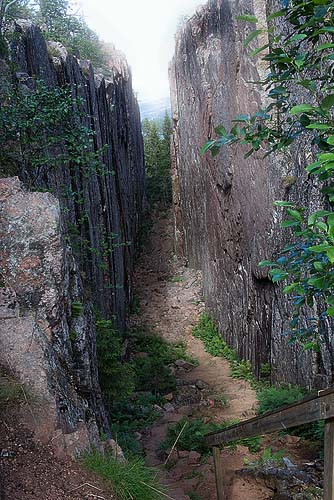
Slottdalsskrevan

== Notes and references ==
- This article was initially translated from the French Wikipedia.
- Naturvårdsverket (2009). "Skötselplan för Skuleskogens nationalpark" (PDF) (in Swedish). Stockholm. ISBN 978-91-620-8410-3.
- Swedish University of Agricultural Sciences (2003). Naturvårdsverket (ed.). "Dokumentation av de svenska nationalparkerna" (PDF) (in Swedish). Älvsbyn. ISBN 91-620-5329-9.
- Johansson, Sven K.-J.; Simonsson, Per; Wallin, Bertil Charlie (1984). CeWe-förl. (ed.). "Skuleskogen, nationalparken i Höga kusten" (in Swedish). Bjästa. ISBN 91-7542-116-X.
- Others
