= Boteå Court District =

Boteå Court District Boteå tingslag
- Judicial court district
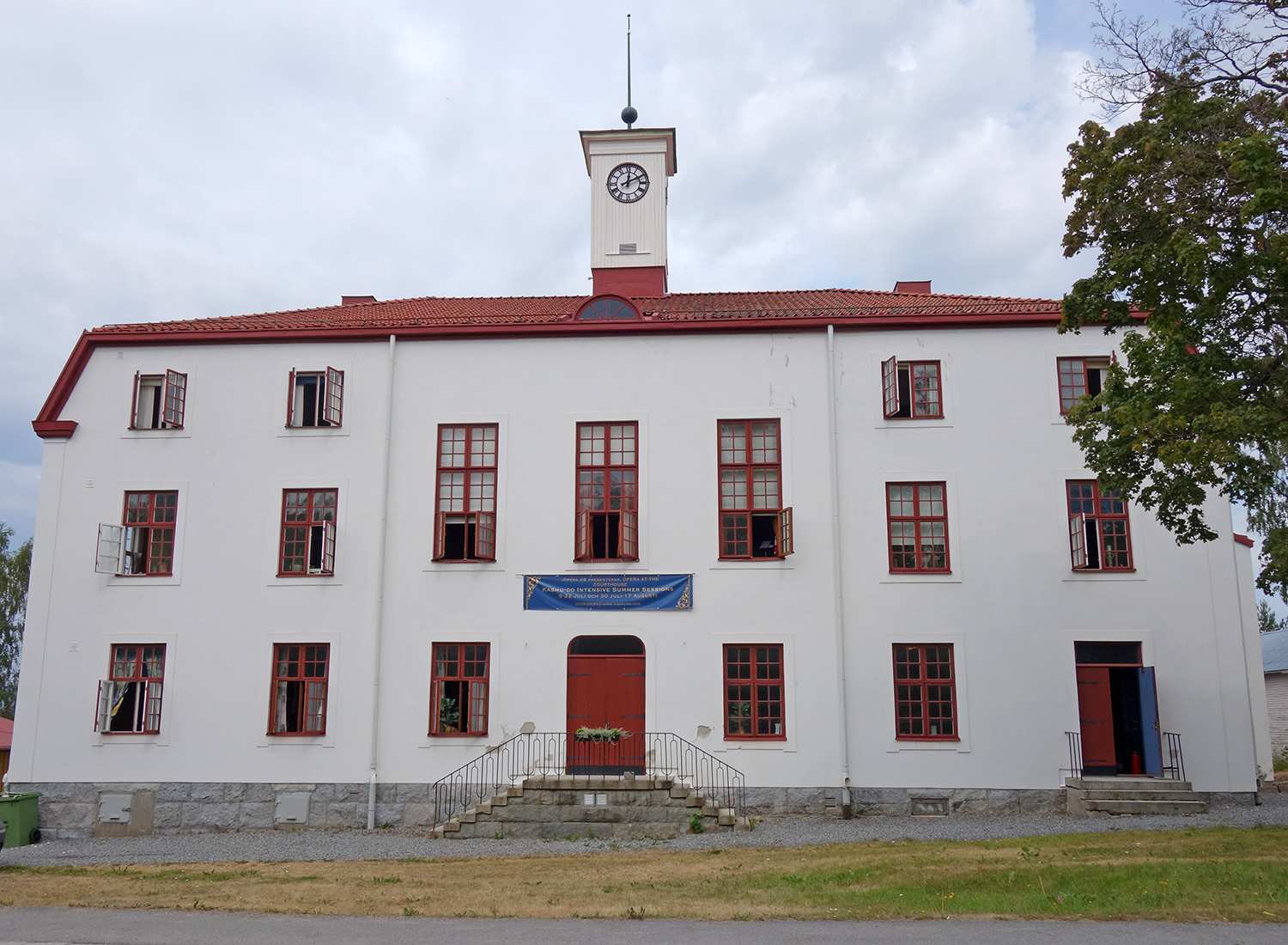
- In 1911, architect Folke Zettervall was hired to convert this building in Nyland into the official courthouse for Boteå tingslag. It served as the primary court location (tingsställe) for Boteå tingslag from 1920 until the district's dissolution in 1947.

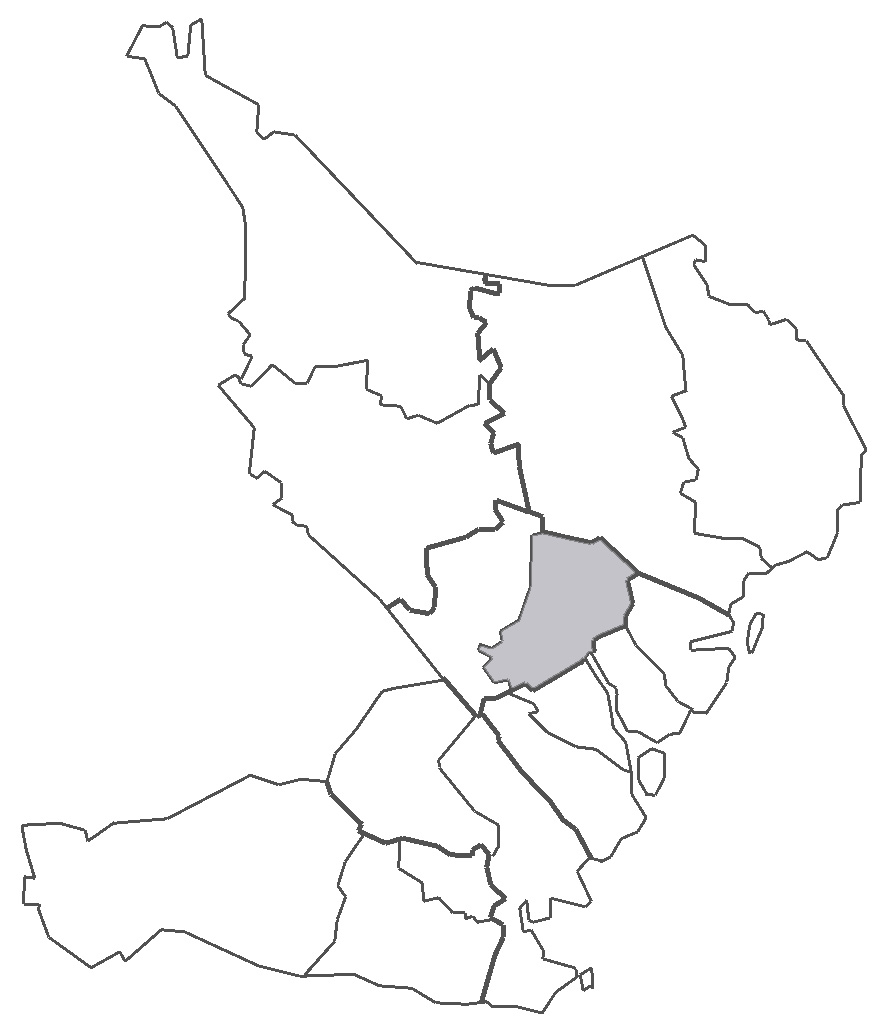

- Map showing historical Boteå tingslag in Västernorrland county
- Coordinates: 63.162144°N 17.785748°E
- Country: Sweden
- County: Västernorrland
- Province: Ångermanland

Population
  - Total: 11,427
- Time zone: UTC+1 (Central European Time)
- Website: sok.riksarkivet.se

Boteå Court District, or Boteå tingslag, was a district of Ångermanland in Sweden. The provinces in Norrland were never divided into hundreds and instead the court district (tingslag) served as the basic division of rural areas.

It was dissolved on December 31, 1947 as part of a judicial consolidation of Swedish court districts and was merged into Ångermanlands mellersta domsagas tingslag which later was absorbed into Sollefteå domsagas tingslag. In 1971 as part of Modern District Court Reforms, Sweden overhauled its historical lower court structure nationwide, replacing all remaining tingslag and häradsrätter with unified district courts (tingsrätter) hence most of the territory Sollefteå domsagas tingslag became part of Sollefteå tingsrätt.

== See also ==
- Sollefteå tingslag
- Ångermanlands mellersta domsaga
- Sollefteå District Court
- Domsaga
- District courts of Sweden
- Hundreds of Sweden
- Boteå
