= Bjästa =

- Location within Västernorrland Location within Sweden
- Coordinates: 63°12′N 18°30′E
- Country: Sweden
- Province: Ångermanland
- County: Västernorrland County
- Municipality: Örnsköldsvik Municipality

Area
  - Total: 2.05 km^{2} (0.79 sq mi)

Population (31 December 2010)
  - Total: 1,808
  - Density: 882/km^{2} (2,280/sq mi)
- Time zone: UTC+1 (CET)
  - Summer (DST): UTC+2 (CEST)

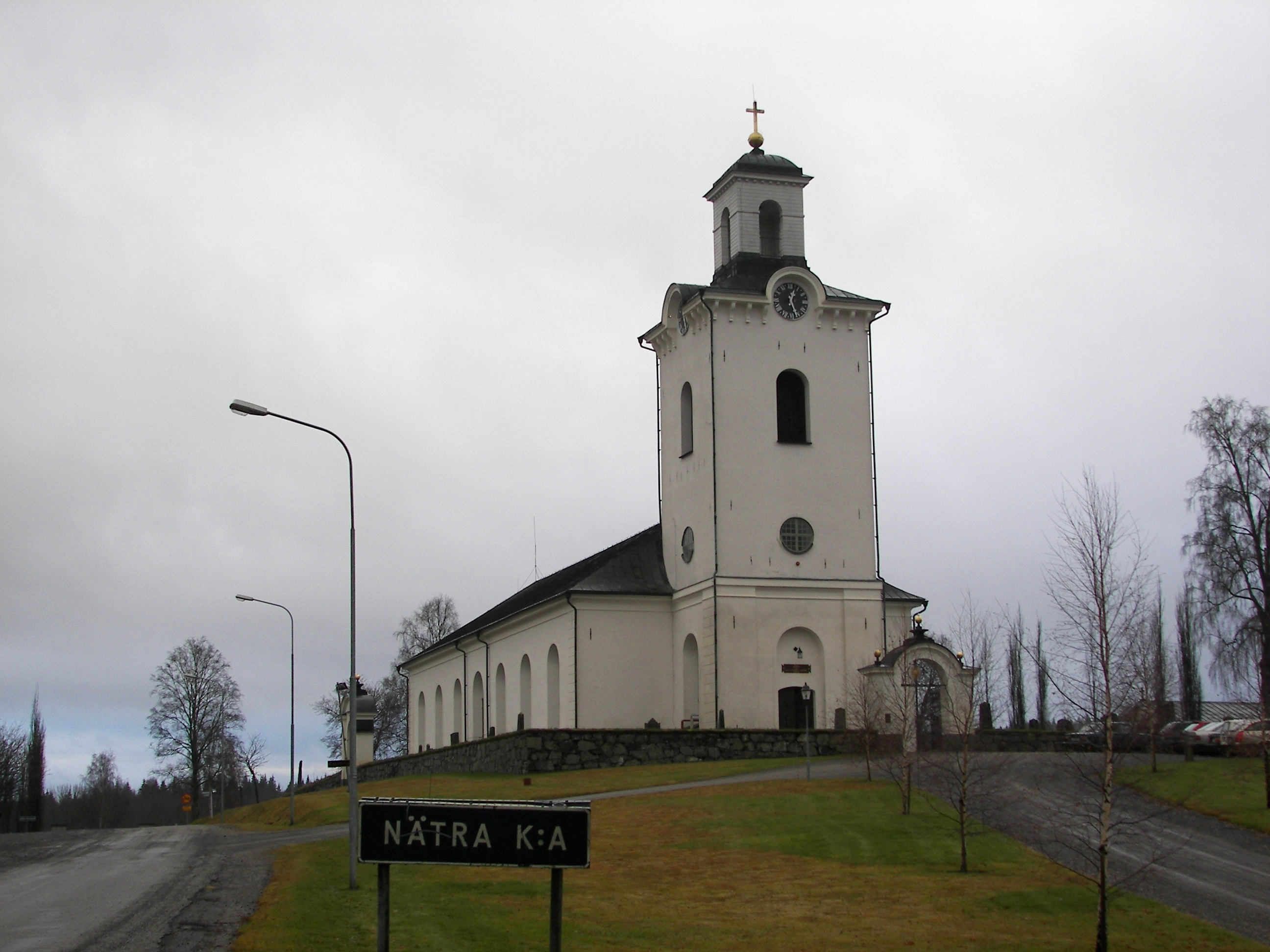
Nätra church in Bjästa, Sweden

Bjästa is a locality situated in Örnsköldsvik Municipality, Västernorrland County, Sweden with 1,808 inhabitants in 2010.
