= Docksta =

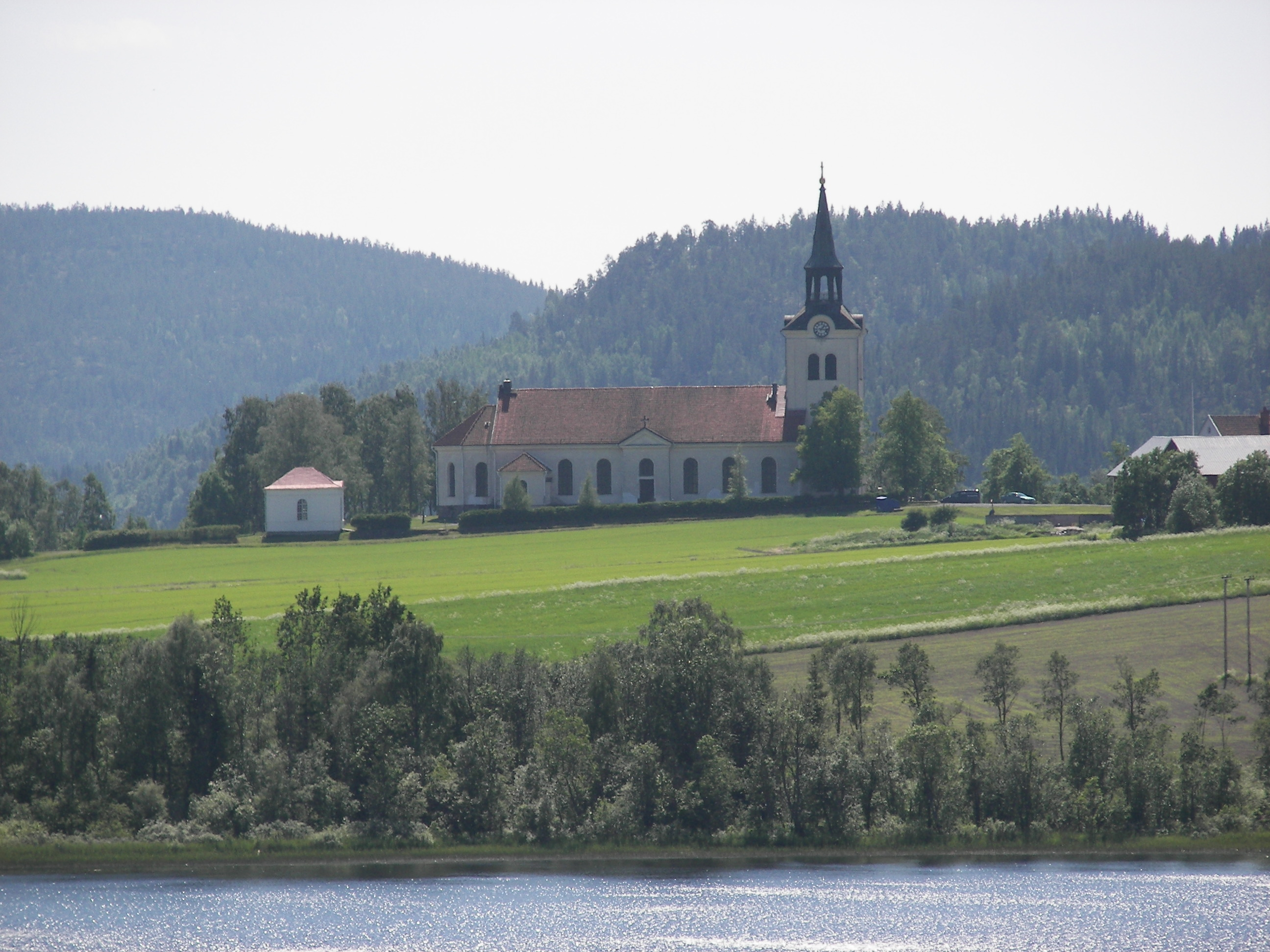

- Location within Västernorrland Location within Sweden
- Coordinates: 63°03′N 18°20′E
- Country: Sweden
- Province: Ångermanland
- County: Västernorrland County
- Municipality: Kramfors Municipality

Area
  - Total: 0.80 km^{2} (0.31 sq mi)

Population (31 December 2010)
  - Total: 378
  - Density: 475/km^{2} (1,230/sq mi)
- Time zone: UTC+1 (CET)
  - Summer (DST): UTC+2 (CEST)
- Climate: Dfc

Docksta is a locality situated in Kramfors Municipality, Västernorrland County, Sweden with 378 inhabitants in 2010.
