= Ångermanland =

Historical province of Sweden

Coordinates: 63°09′14″N 17°14′17″E

- Historical province
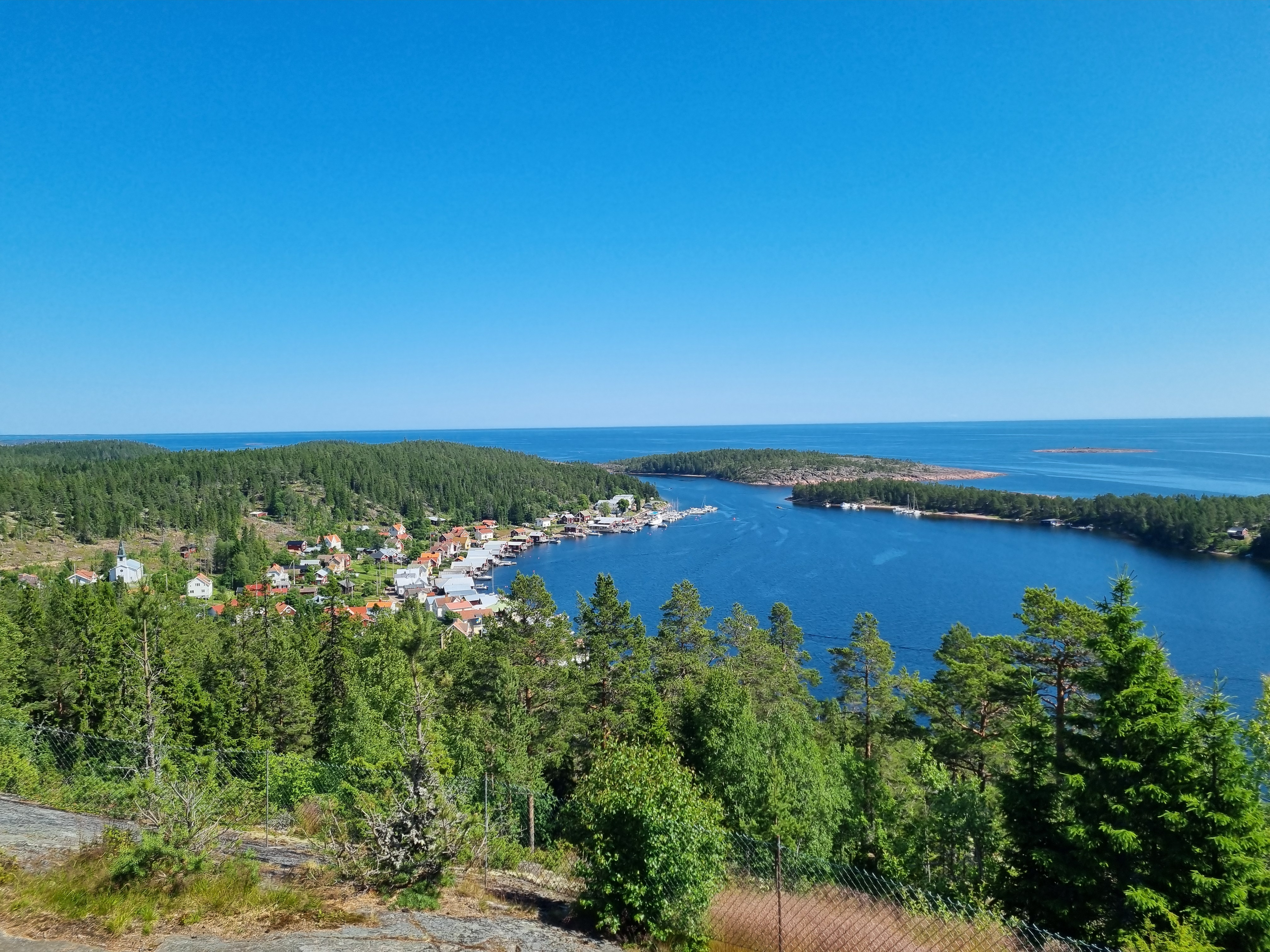

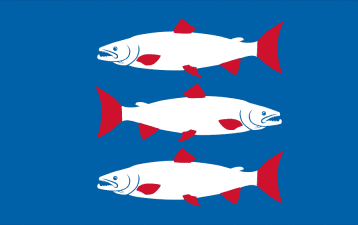
- Flag Coat of arms

- Country: Sweden
- Land: Norrland
- Counties: Västernorrland County; Jämtland County; Västerbotten County

Area
  - Total: 19,507 km^{2} (7,532 sq mi)

Population (31 December 2023)
  - Total: 128,293
  - Density: 6.5768/km^{2} (17.034/sq mi)

Ethnicity
  - Language: Swedish (North Swedish)

Culture
  - Flower: Heartsease
  - Animal: Beaver
  - Bird: —
  - Fish: Lavaret
- Time zone: UTC+1 (CET)
  - Summer (DST): UTC+2 (CEST)

Ångermanland (Swedish pronunciation: [ˈɔ̂ŋːɛrmanˌland] or [ˈɔ̌ŋːɛrmanland]) is a historical province (landskap) in the northern part of Sweden. It is bordered (clockwise from the north) by Swedish Lapland, Västerbotten, the Gulf of Bothnia, Medelpad and Jämtland.

The name is derived from the Old Norse anger, which means "deep fjord" and is a reference to the deep mouth of the Ångerman River (Ångermanälven). The Latin name of the province is Angermannia.

== Administration ==
The traditional provinces of Sweden, while remaining culturally and historically important, no longer serve as administrative or political entities. The heartlands of Ångermanland lie in today's Västernorrland County, with the remainder of the traditional province now forming part of Västerbotten and Jämtland Counties.

== Heraldry ==
The heraldic description of the arms of Ångermanland is: Azure three Salmons naiant Argent finned Gules, the middle one counternaiant, which heraldic meaning is that the rivers have spawning grounds for salmon, i.e. two fish to the sea for each one up the river. The burgh of Peebles in Scotland also has a very similar coat of arms, with similar heraldic context but with a red background. The Ångermanland arms differ from those of Laholm in Halland County and of the Royal Borough of Kingston upon Thames in England, where salmon fishing and processing have been historically important, each of which have their three salmon naiant.

== Geography ==
Ångermanland is the sixth largest of Sweden's provinces with an area of some 19,800 km^{2}, of which around 1,000 km^{2} is water.

The nature of the western part of Ångermanland is greatly influenced by the presence of the Ångerman River. Although the province's soils are in general too barren for cultivation, there is arable farming in the areas adjoining the rivers – the Ångerman River in particular.

The coast of Ångermanland is mountainous and features an extensive archipelago with many steep islands, deep bays and fjords – among them the mouth of the Ångerman River. The landscape is generally accounted picturesque, particularly in the thickly wooded Ådalen region around the Ångerman River. The landscape is varied, with valleys, rocks, and bogs.

The largest town today is Örnsköldsvik, on the coast, with around 33,000 inhabitants. It is followed by Härnösand with 18,000.

=== Facts ===
- Highest mountain: Bunkfjället (740 m, 2428 ft)
- Largest lake: Tåsjön
- National parks: Skuleskogen

The coast line on the Gulf of Bothnia, called the Höga Kusten, has been declared a UNESCO World Heritage Site. The land still rises at the rate of about one centimetre per year, as an effect of the last ice age that ended in the 7th millennium BC.

== Population ==
The population of Ångermanland is 130 923 as of December 31, 2019. It is distributed over three counties as follows:

| County | Population |
|---|---|
| Part of Västernorrland County | 118 603 |
| Part of Västerbotten County | 9 551 |
| Part of Jämtland County | 2 769 |

== History ==
Ångermanland is mentioned the first time in Historia Norwegie as "Angariuam", in 1170. It is thought to have been Christianised in the 12th century, as several runestones were erected in the 11th century. The pirates known as Victual Brothers besieged the Styresholm Fortress in 1398, holding the whole coast of Norrland. The Styresholm Fortress was however demolished in 1434 by the locals during the Engelbrekt Uprising. In 1490, districts Ångermanland, Alir, Sunded, Nordanstig and Medelpad constituted Storhälsingland. Härnösand receives city status in 1585. In 1721 Härnösand was burned to the ground by the Imperial Russian Navy.

In 1931 four demonstrators and one bypasser were shot to death in the Ådalen shootings. It resulted in the forming of the state police, stripping the military of policiary work. Lower Norrland received its first university in 2005 when the Mitthögskolan transformed into the Mid Sweden University (Mittuniversitetet). The university has its courses spread over four cities; Härnösand, Sundsvall, Örnsköldsvik and Östersund.

=== Historical administration ===
Ångermanland was historically divided into chartered cities and districts.

==== Cities ====
- Härnösand (1585)
- Kramfors (1947)
- Sollefteå (1917)
- Örnsköldsvik (1893)

==== Districts ====
- Arnäs Court District
- Boteå Court District
- Gudmundrå Court District
- Nora Court District
- Nordingrå Court District
- Nordmaling Court District
- Nätra Court District
- Ramsele Court District
- Resele Court District
- Själevad Court District
- Sollefteå Court District
- Umeå Court District

== Sports ==
Football in the province is administered by Ångermanlands Fotbollförbund. Ice hockey is also popular, with Modo Hockey.

== Notable people ==
- Pehr Kalm (1716–1779), explorer, botanist, naturalist, and agricultural economist
