= Sollefteå Church =

Church building in Sollefteå Municipality, Sweden

Coordinates: 63°9′44.17″N 17°17′4.63″E

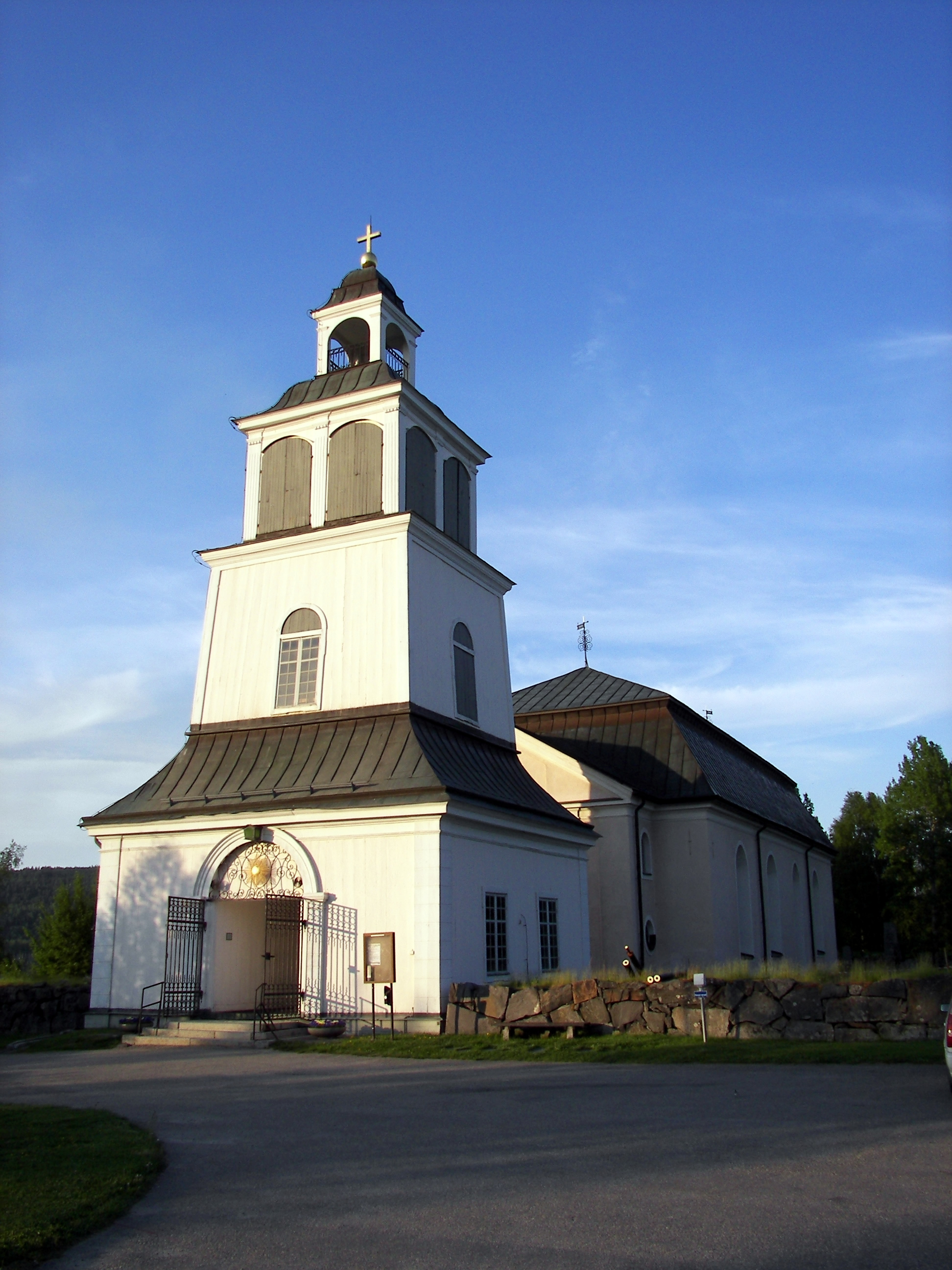
Sollefteå Church with bell tower

The Sollefteå Church was built, using granite, in the 13th century, but was heavily re-modelled in the late 18th century when it was transformed into a rococo building with a high hip roof. The church was extended to the south and west, and a vestry was added in the east. The chapel was also given the same width as the rest of the building. The work was directed by city builder Daniel Hagman from Sundsvall.

The pulpit and the retable were crafted in 1773 and 1787, respectively, by Johan Edler. The organ was obtained in 1883, and in 1971 a second organ was installed in the choir.

The church has a detached bell tower of which the lower section functions as the entrance way through the wall surrounding the church. The tower is built of wood and was erected between 1804 and 1806, and painted white in 1811. The bell tower replaced an older tower built in 1695 by Jon Jonsson. There are two bells in the tower.

== Memorials ==
In 1938, the writer Rosa Fitinghoff paid for her father's remains to be removed to join her mother Laura Fitinghoff's remains at Sollefteå church. Laura's memorial was paid for by her admirers, and the Laura Fitinghoff Society meets there every 17 August.
