= Svedin =

- Language: Swedish

Origin
- Origin: Swedish
- Region of origin: Sweden

Svedin is a Swedish surname. Notable people with the surname include:

- Annie Svedin (born 1991), Swedish ice hockey player
- Frida Svedin Thunström (born 1989), Swedish ice hockey player
- Helen Svedin (born 1976), Swedish model
