= Torsåker parish =

Torsåker parish may refer to:

- Torsåker Parish, Diocese of Härnösand, parish in Diocese of Härnösand
- Torsåker Parish, Diocese of Strängnäs, former parish in Diocese of Strängnäs
- Torsåker Parish, Diocese of Uppsala, parish in Diocese of Uppsala
