= Rosa Fitinghoff =

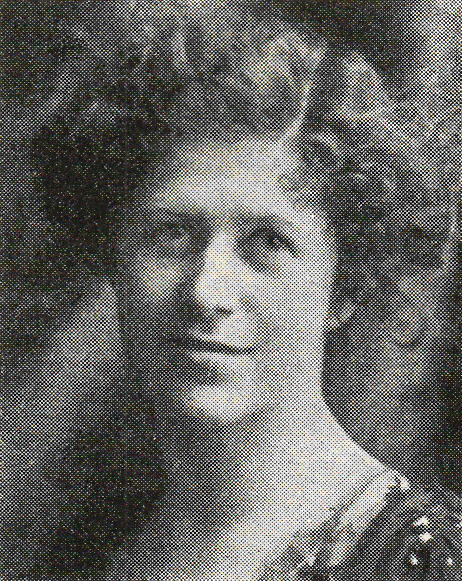
- Born: 5 May 1872; Torsåker parish
- Died: 27 March 1949 (aged 76); Danderyd parish

Rosa Fitinghoff (5 May 1872 – 27 March 1949) was a Swedish writer of novels. She was noted for her interest in dogs. Her mother and her aunt, Malvina Bråkenhielm were also novelists.

== Life ==
Fitinghoff was born in Torsåker parish to an indulgent father, Conrad Fitinghoff and Laura Fitinghoff who was a writer. The lived in a large house in Ekensholm where her father gave her a herd of reindeer and a steamboat as a baptismal gift. However by the time she was eight the family fortune was gone and they moved to a smaller house in Blekinge. She was devoted to her mother and she was educated in Stockholm. Her mother and father were estranged and her mother took in lodgers and took up writing. After school she became her mother's assistant. Her mother joined the writer's association and became part of the capital's cultural group.

Her mother died in 1908 and it was not until 1911 that she had her own work published. Novels continued but the lack of complexity in her characters was noted. She was much more successful when she was writing about dogs and this was her passion. She kept a large collection of poodles and wrote stories about dogs. It was said that she understood dogs better than people, although her knowledge of the people of Lapland was also noted. She took several holidays to Lapland and used this experience in her writing of Unknown Powers in 1937. The following year she paid for her father's remains to be removed to join her mother's at Sollefteå church.

Fitinghoff wrote her last book The Cavalry of Memories in 1948 which was biographical. She died in Danderyd parish the following year.
