= Swedin =

Swedin is a surname. Notable people with the surname include:

- Eric G. Swedin, American technology professor and alternate history writer
- Helen Svedin (sometimes written "Helen Swedin", born 1976), Swedish model
