= Torsåker =

Torsåker can refer to:

- Torsåker, Hofors, Sweden
- Torsåker Parish, Diocese of Härnösand, Kramfors Municipality, Sweden, where the Torsåker witch trials of 1675 took place
- Torsåker Castle, mansion in Uppland, Sweden
- Church village in Gnesta Municipality, Södermanland, Sweden
