= Malvina Bråkenhielm =

Swedish writer

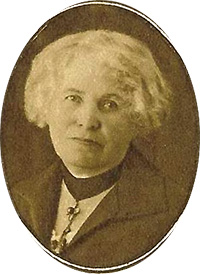
- in 1928
- Born: 25 December 1853; Norrköping
- Died: 25 December 1928 (aged 75); Kungsholms parish
- Writing career
- Pen name: Rachel

Malvina Bråkenhielm born Hilda Ingeborg Malvina Gabriella Runsten (25 December 1853 – 25 December 1928) was a Swedish writer of 30 novels and 250 short stories. She was philanthropic and also performed and taught music. Her elder sister was the writer Laura Fitinghoff.

== Life ==
Bråkenhielm was born in Norrköping on Christmas Day in 1853. Her father, Jonas Bernhard Runsten, was a pastor and a member of parliament. Her parents had a large farm in Sollefteå. She "Vina" was one of five girls who were all musical and studied at the Music Academy in Stockholm. Her mother, Ottilia Löfvander, had been a friend of the "Swedish Nightingale" Jenny Lind. Her family lived half the year in Stockholm where her father attended to his parliamentary duties. Her elder sister Laura Fitinghoff would also be a writer and she would describe the 1860s when the family helped those worse than themselves. Malvina saw her mother's philanthropy as admirable and she adopted her charitable outlook.

In 1873 she married Johan Nikolaus Reenstierna and in three years she was the mother of two and a widow. She gave concerts to raise money and began to write. She beat her sister Laura into print by a year with her publication Skisser och berättelser (Sketches and stories) in 1883 using the nom de plume of Rachel.

In 1889 she gained the name Bråkenhielm when she married Carl in May of that year in New York. By December her not strong new husband had turned to drink and had made her a widow for a second time and a mother of a third child. She returned to Sweden keeping some of the details of her marriage from her sisters.

In her life she wrote more than 30 novels and 250 short stories but she did not rate them very highly. She worked as a singing teacher in Uppsala but poverty eventually drove her to live with her sister Laura, but this was problematic. Laura's success with her 1907 book about the 1860s and her youthful daughter Rosa raised jealousy and arguments.

Like her mother and despite her own poverty Malvina turned to philanthropy.

Bråkenhielm died, the last of the Runtsen daughters, in Kungsholms parish in 1928.
