= Laura Fitinghoff =

Swedish writer (1848–1908)

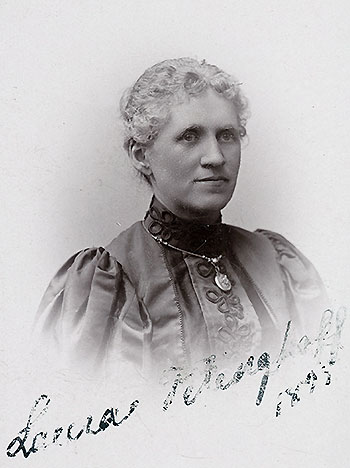
- Born: 14 March 1848
- Died: 17 August 1908 (aged 60)

Laura Mathilde Fitinghoff (born Laura Mathilda Bernhardina Runsten; 14 March 1848 – 17 August 1908) was a Swedish writer, after she was estranged from her husband. She was known for her children's books; particularly Children from Frostmofjället, which became a 1945 film.

== Life ==
She was born in 1848. Her father, Jonas Bernhard Runsten, was a pastor and a member of parliament. She was brought up on a large farm in Sollefteå where she studied astronomy, religion, literature, Latin, English, French and German. She was one of five girls who were all musical and studied at the Music Academy in Stockholm, where her family lived while her father attended to his parliamentary duties. Her sister Malvina would also be a writer and her mother, Ottilia Löfvander, would be remembered for her generosity during the Famine of 1867–1869.

She married Conrad Fitinghoff who was a wealthy businessperson. They lived in a large house in Ekensholm. Fitinghoff's only surviving child Rosa was born in Torsåker parish. Conrad was an indulgent father who gave Rosa a herd of reindeer and a steamboat as a baptismal gift. However, by the time Rosa was eight the family fortune was gone and they moved to a smaller house in Blekinge. Rosa was devoted to her mother. As she and Conrad were estranged she took in lodgers and began to earn her living by writing. Her first book was about five sisters who, like her, lived in a vicarage and A small world among the mountains was said to be the first book in Swedish for children with a Nordic setting. Her following books were usually aimed at women and children and like A small world among the mountains they were frequently based on her own experiences. Her books illustrators included Jenny Nyström and Hilma af Klint and in 1891 her novel Vårluft won second prize in a literary competition.

She joined the writer's association and became part of the capital cultural group. She lived with another writer Mathilda Roos with whom she built the Furuliden house in Stocksund. (This would later become a rest home for women after they both died.)

Children from Frostmofjället was her best known book. It concerned seven poor orphans travelling together with a goat, their food source, during the 1860s in northern Sweden. The story was translated into a number of languages and made into the 1945 film Barnen från Frostmofjället. As well, the goat character, Gullspira, would, in time, be the namesake of an award for Swedish children's filmmakers. The first edition of that book, published in 1907, was illustrated by Vicken von Post Totten.

She died in 1908 and her daughter Rosa who had become her mother's assistant went on to also become a writer. Rosa paid for her father's remains to join Laura's in 1938 and her last book The Cavalry of Memories in 1948 was a source for her mothers biography.

In 1927 her book, Children from Frostmofjället, was translated into English as Children of the Moor by Siri Andrews.

The Laura Fitinghoff Society, founded in 2008, gather on the day of her death, 17 August, around her tombstone at Sollefteå Church. The memorial stone was paid for by her admirers.
