= Ellen Tejle =

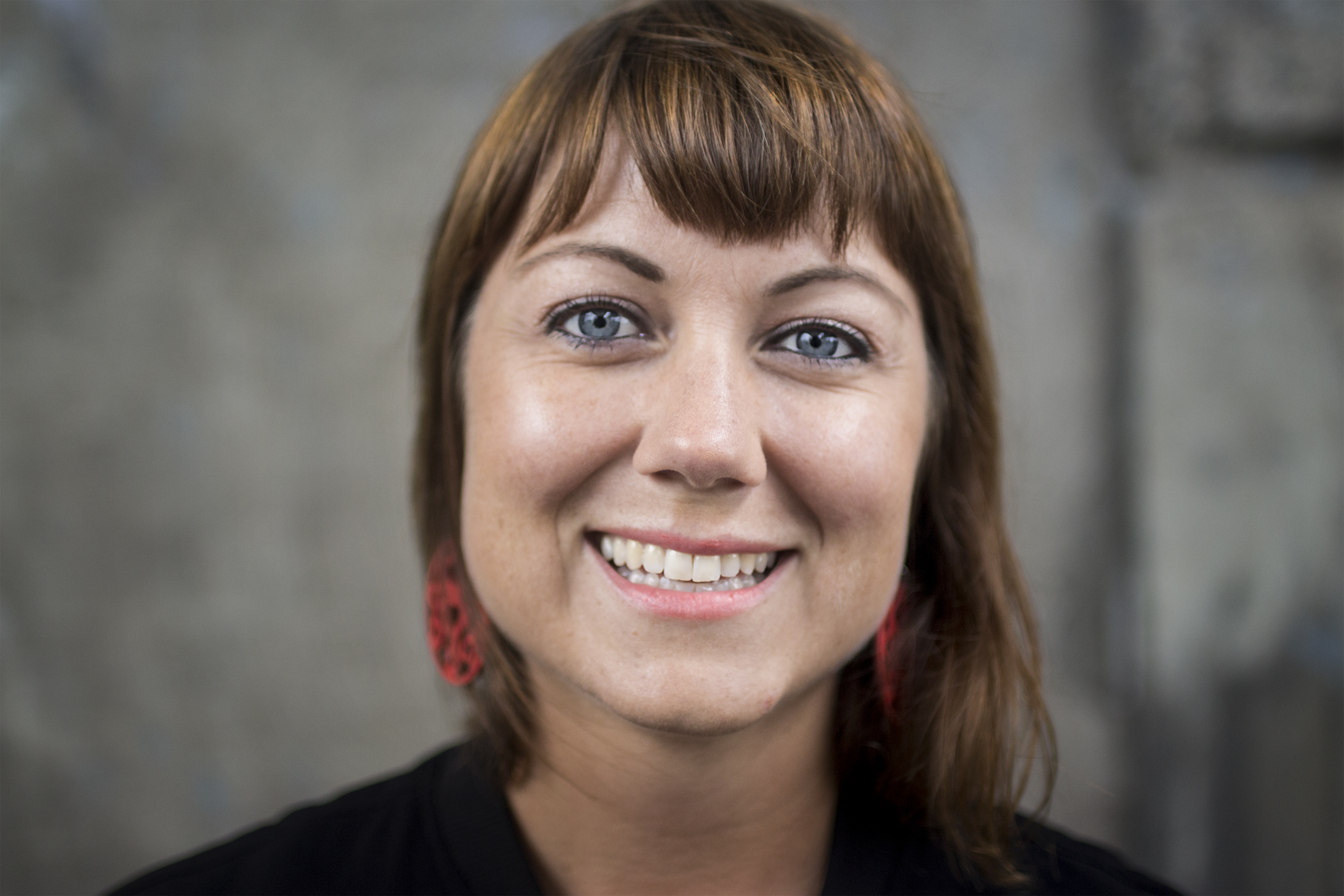
- Ellen Tejle in 2018
- Born: April 9, 1984 (age 41); Sollefteå, Sweden
- Citizenship: Sweden
- Occupation(s): Entrepreneur and Media Manager

Ellen Tejle (born April 9, 1984, in Sollefteå) is a Swedish campaigner for awareness of women's representation in film. She has been included in the BBC's list of 100 inspiring and influential women from around the world for 2018.

== Life ==
Ellen Tejle has started Bio Rio (2008–2016) and Bistro Barbro in Stockholm. Since 2017 she has been the CEO of the media house Fanzingo.

She additionally founded 'A-RATE'', a campaign to further gender equality in the film industry, present in ten countries globally. They designed the logo for the Bechdel Wallace test, which identified films with two named women having a conversation about something other than a man. If it passes that test it is A-rated.

== Filmography ==
She was of the 97 people included in the film This Changes Everything (2018)
