= Mathilda Roos =

Swedish writer (1852–1908)

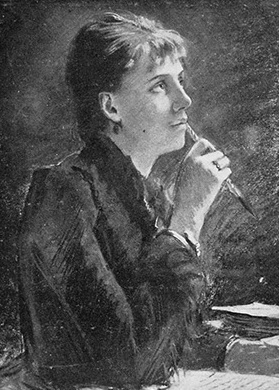
- Mathilda Roos
- Born: 2 August 1852; Stockholm, Sweden
- Died: 17 July 1908 (aged 55); Danderyd, Sweden
- Occupation: writer

Lovisa Mathilda Roos (2 August 1852 – 17 July 1908), also known under the pen name M. Rs., was a Swedish writer.

== Biography ==
Lovisa Mathilda Roos was born 2 August 1852 in Stockholm. Her parents were Malte Leopold Roos (1806–1882), a colonel at Svea Artillery Regiment, and Mathilda (Tilda) Beata Meurk (born 1821). She was educated at home and at Åhlinska skolan. Remaining unmarried, she lived with his sister Anna and sometimes also with Laura Fitinghoff, with whom she built the Furuliden house in Stocksund, which later became, as she had hoped, a rest home for women.

Roos was a member of the women's association Nya Idun and one of its first committee members.

Roos' novels usually dealt with women's issues and their unfair treatment in society. She was not afraid to address sensitive subjects at that time including lesbian love in Den första kärleken (The First Love). A religious crisis in the 1880s affected her later books. In the novel Hvit ljung (White Heather), she takes up the unclear living conditions of a teacher and rape. This is considered to have contributed to a government decision that greatly improved teachers' salaries. In women's political pamphlets, she addressed Ellen Key's ideas, Ett ord till fröken Ellen Key och till den svenska kvinnan (A word to Miss Ellen Key and to the Swedish woman), 1896. Roos died 17 July 1908, in Danderyd.

== Selected works ==
Fiction

- Marianne, 1881. OCLC 186221343 SELIBR 8221523
- Vårstormar, 1883. OCLC 743195735 SELIBR 12755378
- Berättelser och skizzer, 1884. OCLC 473092837 SELIBR 11828893
- Hårdt mot hårdt : berättelse, 1886. OCLC 186227845 SELIBR 17419073
- Höststormar: berättelse, 1887. OCLC 473092910 SELIBR 12755374
- Lifsbilder: berättelser, 1888. OCLC 80099215 SELIBR 8222515
- Familjen Verle: en skildring, 1889. OCLC 473092850 SELIBR 17062548
- Saulus af Tarsus: en själs historia, 1890. OCLC 186104263 SELIBR 8203402
- Genom skuggor: en nutidsskildring, 1891. OCLC 753088679 SELIBR 17062577
- Oförgätliga ord: ett minne, 1891. OCLC 939702338 SELIBR 13489421
- Strejken på Bergstomta: en skildring ur lifvet, 1892. OCLC 79713921 SELIBR 8222516
- Helgmålsklockan: skildring från Norrland, 1896. OCLC 937305760 SELIBR 8233750
- Karin Holm: en berättelse för mödrar, 1896. OCLC 677105843 SELIBR 8222997
- Skepp som förgås i stormen: berättelse, 1896. OCLC 186221417 SELIBR 8221533
- Från norrskenets land: sägner och tilldragelser, 1897. OCLC 14040922 SELIBR 8222760
- Hägringar: berättelser, 1898. OCLC 838132451 SELIBR 18583809
- Hvad Ivar Lyth hörde i fängelset: berättelse, 1898. OCLC 677104716 SELIBR 8222761
- De osynliga vägarna, 1903–1904. OCLC 186262677 SELIBR 8228831
- En springande gnista och andra berättelser, 1906. OCLC 186227237 SELIBR 8222413
- Hvit ljung, 1907. OCLC 186229088 SELIBR 8222415
- Maj: en familjehistoria : prisbelönt vid Iduns stora romanpristäfling år 1905, 1907. OCLC 186298871 SELIBR 8235335
- En moders dagbok och andra berättelser, 1908. OCLC 30386728 SELIBR 8222412
- När bladen falla: dikter, 1909. OCLC 83762106 SELIBR 1617016

For children and young readers

- I vårbrytningen: teckningar ur barnens värld, 1891. Illustrated by Jenny Nyström. OCLC 186227861 SELIBR 8222513
- Önskekransen: en berättelse för unga kvinnor, 1892. OCLC 186227895 SELIBR 8222518
- Det roligaste af allt, 1893. OCLC 186227543 SELIBR 8222460
- En liten tviflare, 1893. OCLC 677104545 SELIBR 8222461
- Kärlekens hemlighet, 1893. OCLC 186227524 SELIBR 8222459
- Ur barndomens värld: berättelser, 1894. Illustrated by Jenny Nyström. OCLC 186227891 SELIBR 8222517
- Jul, 1894. OCLC 186227556 SELIBR 8222463
- Det allra käraste, 1894. OCLC 186227549 SELIBR 8222462
- Fader vår, 1895. OCLC 186229526 SELIBR 8222744
- Tant Majkens berättelse, 1898. OCLC 186231298 SELIBR 8222985
- Lilla "tröste-mor", 1898. OCLC 186231291 SELIBR 8222984
- Guds änglar, 1898. OCLC 937111622 SELIBR 8222986
- Djupets sagor: berättelser, 1901. OCLC 14040911 SELIBR 8223786
- Glädjeblomster: berättelser för de små, 1905. Illustrated by Jenny Nyström. OCLC 186236137 SELIBR 8223787
