= Joacim Jonsson =

Swedish football manager (born 1974)

Personal information
- Full name: Björn Olof Joacim Jonsson
- Date of birth: 26 September 1974 (age 52)
- Position: Defender

Senior career*
| Years | Team | Apps | (Gls) |
| –1996 | GIF Sundsvall | | |
| 1997–1999 | Fredrikstad | | |
| 2000–2007 | Kvik Halden | | |

Managerial career
- 2003–2004: Kvik Halden (player-manager)
- 2006–2007: Kvik Halden (player-manager)
- 2007–2013: Fredrikstad (scout, assistant, director of sports)
- 2022–: Vålerenga (director of sports)
- * Club domestic league appearances and goals

Joacim Jonsson (born 26 September 1974) is a Swedish association football pundit, and former player and manager. He is currently director of sports at Vålerenga.

He hails from Sollefteå. He played for GIF Sundsvall before moving to Norway in 1997. He played three seasons for Fredrikstad FK before playing for Kvik Halden FK from 2000 to 2007.

In September 2003 the coaches of Kvik were fired, and Jonsson became player-manager. His job was not renewed after the 2004 season, He was given a new chance ahead of the 2006 season.

After the 2007 season he rejoined Fredrikstad FK as scout and analyst. He was also assistant manager, managing director of sports, and lastly director of sports. In the summer of 2013, Jonsson was let go together with analyst Trond Amundsen and U20 manager Tom Freddy Aune.

As a pundit, he operates through his own firm JJ Consulting. Appearing in C More on a freelance basis, he changed channel to Eurosport when Discovery acquired the rights to the two Norwegian top tiers for men.

On 29 March 2022, he was appointed director of sports at Vålerenga.
