= Andreas Molinder =

Swedish ice hockey player

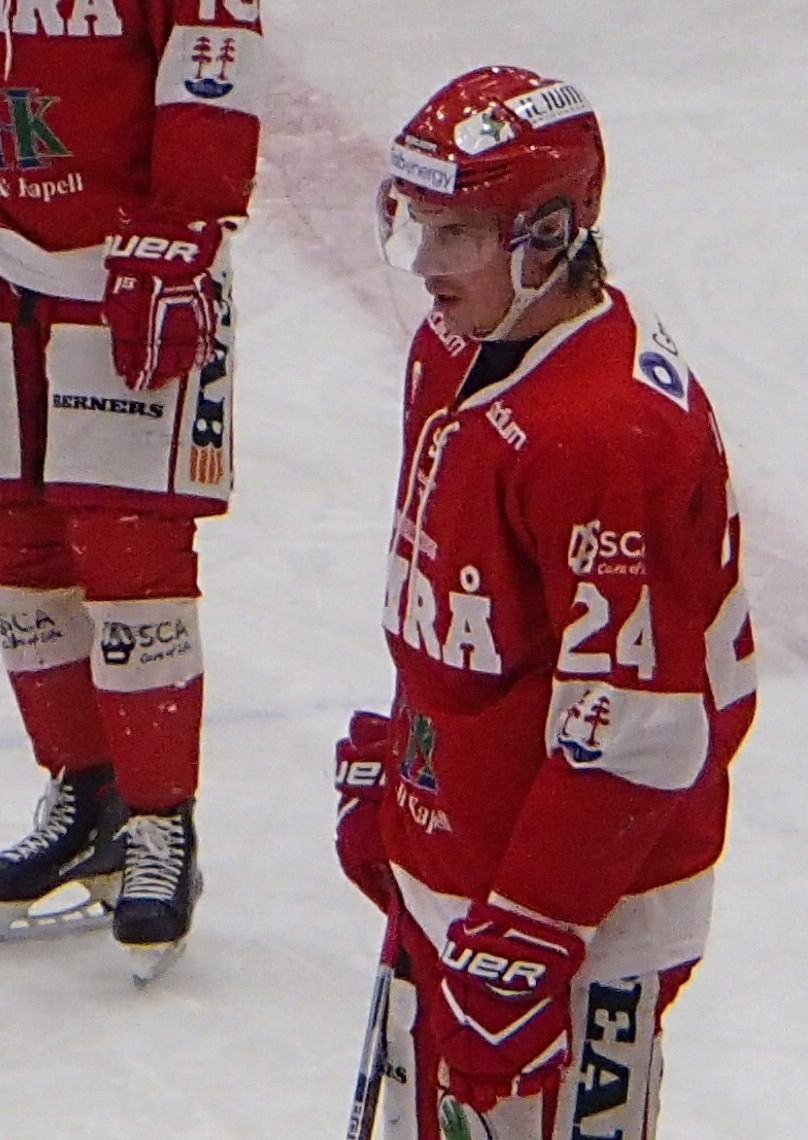
- Born: February 23, 1987 (age 39) Sollefteå, Sweden
- Height: 6 ft 0 in (183 cm)
- Weight: 174 lb (79 kg; 12 st 6 lb)
- Position: Centre
- Shot: Left
- Played for: Modo Hockey; Linköpings HC; Timrå IK
- Playing career: 2005–2019

Andreas Christofer Molinder (born February 23, 1987) is a Swedish ice hockey coach and former ice hockey player who is currently the head coach for Timrå IK U20 of the U20 Nationell.

Molinder previously played in the Swedish Hockey League for Modo Hockey,
Linköping HC, and Timrå IK.

== Career statistics ==
			Regular season					Playoffs
Season	Team	League	GP	G	A	Pts	PIM	GP	G	A	Pts	PIM
2002–03	Ramsele IK	Division 2	14	11	11	22	—	—	—	—	—	—
2003–04	Modo Hockey J18	J18 Allsvenskan	13	7	7	14	10	4	1	2	3	2
2003–04	Modo Hockey J20	J20 SuperElit	4	0	0	0	0	—	—	—	—	—
2004–05	Modo Hockey J18	J18 Allsvenskan	3	3	0	3	0	1	1	1	2	0
2004–05	Modo Hockey J20	J20 SuperElit	31	8	13	21	14	5	1	2	3	6
2005–06	Modo Hockey J20	J20 SuperElit	40	15	33	48	34	2	2	1	3	2
2005–06	Modo Hockey	Elitserien	4	1	0	1	2	—	—	—	—	—
2006–07	Modo Hockey J20	J20 SuperElit	9	7	8	15	2	5	1	3	4	0
2006–07	Modo Hockey	Elitserien	43	0	2	2	8	3	0	0	0	0
2007–08	Modo Hockey	Elitserien	53	6	10	16	14	5	1	0	1	2
2008–09	Modo Hockey	Elitserien	54	2	5	7	12	—	—	—	—	—
2009–10	Modo Hockey J20	J20 SuperElit	1	0	1	1	0	—	—	—	—	—
2009–10	Modo Hockey	Elitserien	48	5	9	14	18	—	—	—	—	—
2010–11	Linköping HC	Elitserien	54	7	7	14	10	7	0	1	1	0
2011–12	Linköping HC	Elitserien	28	3	7	10	0	—	—	—	—	—
2011–12	Timrå IK J20	J20 SuperElit	1	0	3	3	0	—	—	—	—	—
2011–12	Timrå IK	Elitserien	15	0	2	2	0	—	—	—	—	—
2012–13	Timrå IK	Elitserien	42	7	9	16	6	—	—	—	—	—
2013–14	Timrå IK	HockeyAllsvenskan	46	3	10	13	26	—	—	—	—	—
2014–15	Timrå IK	HockeyAllsvenskan	44	7	12	19	10	—	—	—	—	—
2015–16	Timrå IK	HockeyAllsvenskan	40	8	10	18	24	4	0	2	2	0
2016–17	Timrå IK	HockeyAllsvenskan	41	5	9	14	16	5	0	1	1	8
2017–18	Timrå IK	HockeyAllsvenskan	42	1	7	8	6	10	0	2	2	2
2018–19	Timrå IK	SHL	45	0	2	2	6	—	—	—	—	—
SHL (Elitserien) totals			386	31	53	84	76	15	1	1	2	2
HockeyAllsvenskan totals			213	24	48	72	82	19	0	5	5	10
