= U.F.C. Os Pastilhas =

Portuguese sports club

Os Pastilhas
- Full name: União Futebol Clube
- Ground: Pavilhão Municipal do Laranjeiro, Cova da Piedade, Almada
- Capacity: 4,000
- Chairman: Pedro Loureiro
- Website: http://www.ospastilhas.tk

União Futebol Clube, commonly known as Os Pastilhas, is a Portuguese sports club based in Cova da Piedade, Almada. The club is best known for its football and futsal teams.

Its futsal team is best known as the first club of Luís Figo, widely regarded as one of the greatest Portuguese footballers of all time.
