= Nils Åkerblom =

Swedish equestrian

Personal information
- Full name: Nils Carlsson Åkerblom
- Nationality: Swedish
- Born: 17 September 1895 Sollefteå, Sweden
- Died: 12 October 1974 (aged 79) Stockholm, Sweden

Sport
- Sport: Equestrian

Nils Carlsson Åkerblom (17 September 1895 – 12 October 1974) was a Swedish equestrian. He competed in the 1920 Summer Olympics.
