= Ann-Cathrine Wiklander =

Swedish female singer

- Born: July 4, 1958 (age 67); Sollefteå, Sweden
- Genres: dansband music, schlager
- Occupation: singer
- Years active: 1988–

Ann-Cathrine Wiklander, born 4 July 1958 in Sollefteå, Sweden, is a Swedish female singer, scoring dansband successes during the 1990s.

She has scored Svensktoppen hit songs like Kärleken (1993), Vänd inte ryggen åt en vän (1994), Alla stunder (1995), Julklockor över vår jord (1995–1996), Liksom svalorna kommer med solen (1996), Min tanke är hos mig (1998) and Gamla vänner (2000). On 12 July 1994, she appeared as a guest at Allsång på Skansen.

Ann-Cathrine Wiklander participated with the song Som en dröm, at "Schlager-SM" i TV3 1994, together with Keith Almgrens orkester at Sandgrund in Karlstad.

In late 2012, she began touring with Erik Lihm. She also works as a diabetics nurse at Österåsens hälsohem in Sollefteå.

== Discography ==
=== Albums ===
- Ann-Cathrine Wiklanders (1995)

=== EPs ===
- Min barndoms jular (1995)
