= 2000 Ballon d'Or =

Annual association football award event in France

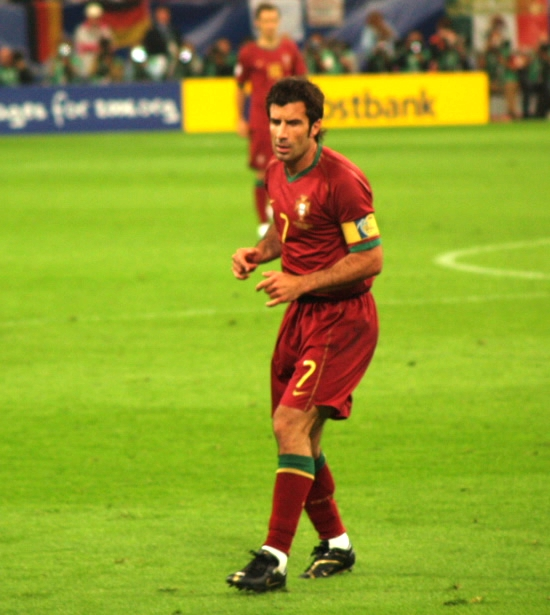
- 2000 Ballon d'Or winner, Luís Figo in 2006
- Date: 19 December 2000
- Presented by: France Football

Highlights
- Won by: (Portugal) Luís Figo (1st award)
- Website: ballondor.com

The 2000 Ballon d'Or (lit. '2000 Golden Ball'), given to the best football player in Europe as judged by a panel of sports journalists from UEFA member countries, was awarded to Luís Figo on 19 December 2000.

Figo was the second Portuguese player to win the award after Eusébio (1965). He was also the third Real Madrid player to win the trophy after Alfredo Di Stéfano (1957, 1959) and Raymond Kopa (1958).

== Rankings ==
On 13 November 2000, the shortlist of 50 male players compiled by a group of experts from France Football was announced.

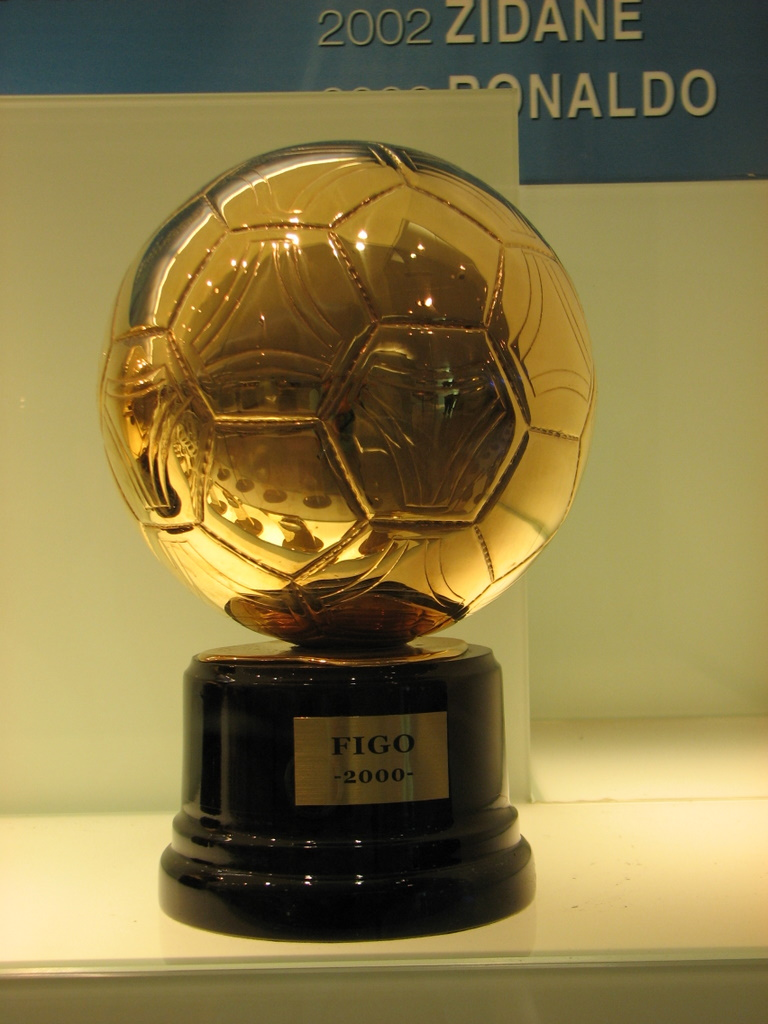
Luís Figo's Ballon d'Or replica

The voting results went as follows:

Rank	Player	Club(s)	Nationality	Points
1	Luís Figo	(Spain) Barcelona (Spain) Real Madrid	Portugal	197
2	Zinedine Zidane	(Italy) Juventus	France	181
3	Andriy Shevchenko	(Italy) Milan	Ukraine	85
4	Thierry Henry	(England) Arsenal	France	57
5	Alessandro Nesta	(Italy) Lazio	Italy	39
6	Rivaldo	(Spain) Barcelona	Brazil	39
7	Gabriel Batistuta	(Italy) Roma	Argentina	26
8	Gaizka Mendieta	(Spain) Valencia	Spain	22
9	Raúl	(Spain) Real Madrid	Spain	18
10	Paolo Maldini	(Italy) Milan	Italy	10
10	David Beckham	(England) Manchester United	England	10
12	Zlatko Zahovič	(Greece) Olympiacos (Spain) Valencia	Slovenia	8
12	Fabien Barthez	(England) Manchester United	France	8
14	Francesco Toldo	(Italy) Fiorentina	Italy	7
14	Francesco Totti	(Italy) Roma	Italy	7
14	Roberto Carlos	(Spain) Real Madrid	Brazil	7
17	Patrick Kluivert	(Spain) Barcelona	Netherlands	6
18	Edgar Davids	(Italy) Juventus	Netherlands	5
18	Hakan Şükür	(Italy) Internazionale	Turkey	5
18	Mário Jardel	(Turkey) Galatasaray	Brazil	5
18	Fernando Redondo	(Spain) Real Madrid (Italy) Milan	Argentina	5
22	Pavel Nedvěd	(Italy) Lazio	Czech Republic	4
22	David Trezeguet	(Italy) Juventus	France	4
24	Marcel Desailly	(England) Chelsea	France	2
24	Oliver Kahn	(Germany) Bayern Munich	Germany	2
24	Rui Costa	(Italy) Fiorentina	Portugal	2
27	Laurent Blanc	(Italy) Internazionale	France	1
27	Claudio López	(Spain) Valencia (Italy) Lazio	Argentina	1
27	Roy Keane	(England) Manchester United	Republic of Ireland	1
27	Juan Sebastián Verón	(Italy) Lazio	Argentina	1

Additionally, nineteen players were nominated but received no votes: Sonny Anderson (Brazil and Lyon), Nicolas Anelka (France, Real Madrid and Paris Saint-Germain), Jocelyn Angloma (France and Valencia), Dennis Bergkamp (Netherlands and Arsenal), Hernán Crespo (Argentina, Parma and Lazio), Didier Deschamps (France, Chelsea and Valencia), Marcelo Gallardo (Argentina and Monaco), Geremi (Cameroon and Real Madrid), Ryan Giggs (Wales and Manchester United), Filippo Inzaghi (Italy and Juventus), Patrick M'Boma (Cameroon, Cagliari and Parma), Savo Milošević (Serbia and Montenegro, Zaragoza and Parma), Nuno Gomes (Portugal, Benfica and Fiorentina), Álvaro Recoba (Uruguay and Internazionale), Paul Scholes (England and Manchester United), Marco Simone (Italy and Monaco), Jaap Stam (Netherlands and Manchester United), Sylvain Wiltord (France, Bordeaux and Arsenal) and Boudewijn Zenden (Netherlands and Barcelona).
