= Vicken von Post Totten =

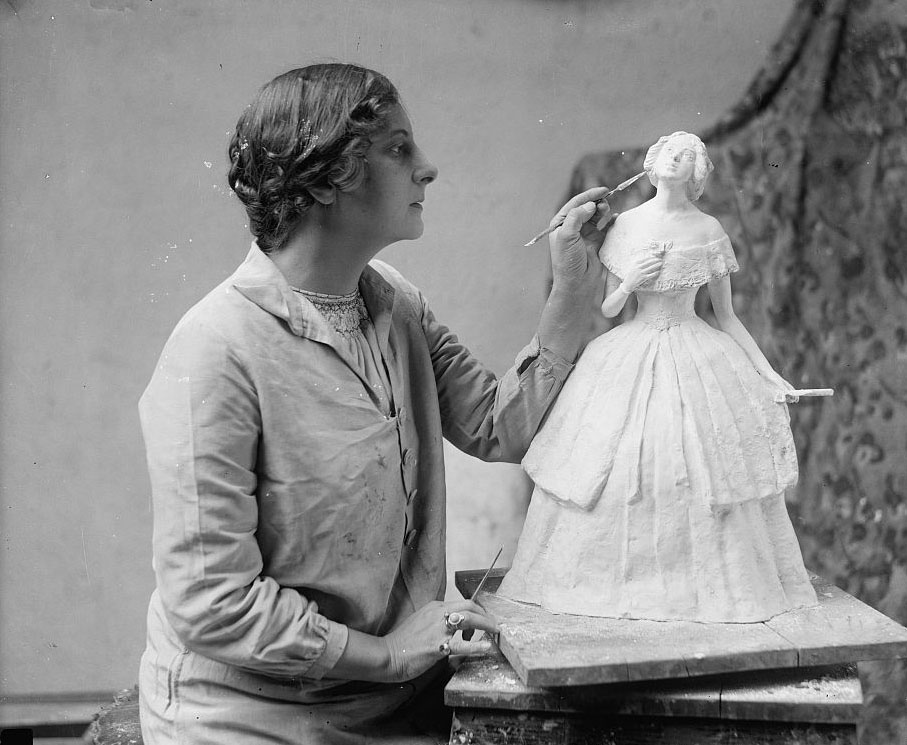
Vicken von Post Totten.

Hedvig Erika ("Vicken") von Post Börjeson Totten (March 12, 1886 – June 21, 1950) was a Swedish ceramicist, sculptor, painter, and illustrator.

== Life and career ==
She studied at the Royal Swedish Academy of Arts with Gerhard Henning, known for his pieces produced by the Royal Danish Porcelain Factory. She also studied in Paris.

She illustrated the first edition of Laura Fitinghoff’s children's book Children from Frostmofjället (1907). She worked for the Rörstrand Porcelain Factory from the summer of 1915 to 1921, where she modelled approximately thirty figurines that were put into production.

She married sculptor Börje Börjeson in 1915, and separated from him in 1920. In 1921, she traveled to the United States to participate in a Washington, D.C. exhibition, met and married architect George Oakley Totten Jr.

Post Totten opened and operated an art school in Washington D.C. from 1921 to 1941. She had an acclaimed exhibition at The Corcoran Gallery of Art in 1934. She was a member of the National Association of Women Artists.

Notable works include "Symbol of Flight" (1927), a bronze sculpture that was presented by the women of Washington, D.C. to Charles Lindbergh; and eleven limestone bas-relief panels depicting the history of transportation (1932) modeled for the façade of the main post office in Waterbury, Connecticut, a building designed by her husband. Several U.S. post offices contain New Deal art by Post Totten. Her plaster of Paris mural, "Pastoral of Spencer," was installed in the Spencer, West Virginia Post Office in 1938.

Works by her are in the collections of the Metropolitan Museum of Art, the Nationalmuseum in Stockholm, Sweden, and other museums.
