= Sollefteå =

Place in Sweden

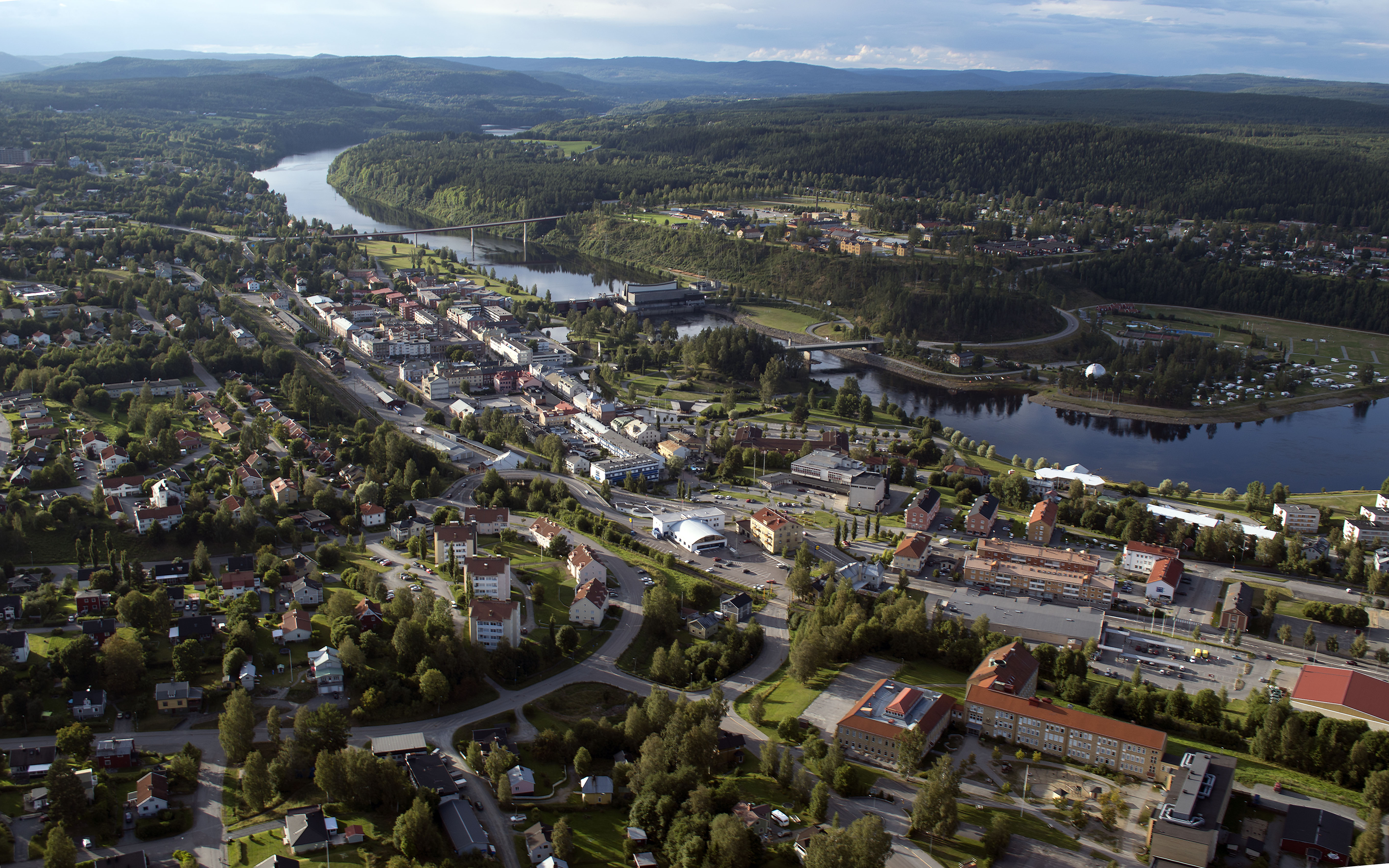
- Aerial view of Sollefteå, August 2014

- Location within Västernorrland Location within Sweden
- Coordinates: 63°10′N 17°16′E
- Country: Sweden
- Province: Ångermanland
- County: Västernorrland County
- Municipality: Sollefteå Municipality

Area
  - Total: 9.40 km^{2} (3.63 sq mi)

Population (31 December 2019)
  - Total: 8,643
  - Density: 911/km^{2} (2,360/sq mi)
- Time zone: UTC+1 (CET)
  - Summer (DST): UTC+2 (CEST)

Sollefteå (Swedish: [sʊˈlɛ̌ftɛɔ]) is a locality and the seat of Sollefteå Municipality in Västernorrland County, Sweden.

== History ==
The earliest written account on Sollefteå is found in a script dating back to 1270. During this time the name of the village was given as De Solatum - a name that can be interpreted as a composition of Sol (sun) and at (property) i.e. literally The sunlit region. De Solatum also can be interpreted as desolation, which means loneliness or remoteness (see Remote and isolated community).

With Sollefteå being located at the lowest rapids of the Ångermanälven thereby making it the last outpost to which it was possible to sail. The village developed into a municipality. The town changed from a commercial town into a town dominated by the military when the two regiments T 3 (Logistics) and I 21 (Infantry) were located there in 1898 and 1911 respectively.

In 1902 Sollefteå obtained the status of market town or köping before finally being granted a town charter in 1917 thereby making it a city.

It is now the seat of the much larger Sollefteå Municipality. Sollefteå is, despite its small population, for historical reasons normally still referred to as a city.

== Notable buildings ==
=== The pharmacy ===
The pharmacy building was erected in 1889. It is a brick building, two and a half storeys high. The style of the building is influenced by the late 19th-century architectural style and is dominated by the neo-Gothic style. The house was designed by the architect Niclas Wahrgren.

The many various architectural styles represented in the building is seen in the medieval inspired crenellated corner tower, Norman arches, North German gothic styles, blind windows with pointed arches and portico supported by columns. There are also Renaissance elements in the design, for example the staircase's orientalic/antique and geometric mosaics with meanders. The overall style of the building is reminiscent of the palatial buildings erected on Strandvägen in Stockholm and in the Stenstaden in Sundsvall at the same time.

In 1984, the building was declared a historic building and thereby protected from demolition or major alterations. It is today the home of the local library as well as the city's museum.

=== Hotel Appelbergs ===
The hotel is located in the centre of Sollefteå, along the pedestrian district. It is also the oldest hotel in the city, built in 1882 by timberman and innkeeper Erik Appelberg.

The hotel became a hub for timber-merchants as well as local potentates. Notable guests include Crown Princess Stéphanie of Austria, King Oscar II and Gustav V of Sweden, and Kaiser Wilhelm II. The hotel also provided accommodation for King Chulalongkorn of Siam and four of his princes during their tour of Ångermanland in the early 20th century. Their journey is commemorated in the hotel with a plaque, and in the village of Utanede with a royal pavilion.

The building is a good example of the early architecture of Sollefteå, being built of wood.

- Sollefteå Church

=== Multrå transmitter ===
The Multrå transmitter is a facility for FM/TV broadcasting with a 288-metre-tall (945 ft) mast.

== Climate ==
The nearest weather station to Sollefteå is located in Österforse, slightly more than 10 kilometres (6.2 mi) by air to its south-west. The station's slightly more southerly latitude is likely even exceeded by a 50–80 metres higher elevation depending on location within Sollefteå. This likely renders Sollefteå slightly milder, particularly during afternoons.

Österforse has a subarctic climate (Dfc) that is quite moderate in nature considering its inland position and latitude. Summer days are very warm for North Central Sweden, being heavily affected by its low elevation in comparison to areas further west such as Östersund. Temperatures are heavily dependent on wind direction and the convergences of warm southerly and cold northerly air. Temperature inversion is also a factor due to its position beneath the mountain range. As a result, cold snaps can be quite extreme, resulting in an all-time low of −43 °C (−45 °F). The all-time heat record is from July 2, 2015 with 32.8 °C (91.0 °F) in an otherwise chilly summer.

Climate data for Österforse (2002–2018; extremes since 1901)
Month	Jan	Feb	Mar	Apr	May	Jun	Jul	Aug	Sep	Oct	Nov	Dec	Year
Record high °C (°F)	10.1 (50.2)	12.3 (54.1)	17.0 (62.6)	23.0 (73.4)	28.7 (83.7)	31.3 (88.3)	32.8 (91.0)	30.8 (87.4)	27.6 (81.7)	22.4 (72.3)	12.1 (53.8)	10.4 (50.7)	32.8 (91.0)
Mean maximum °C (°F)	4.5 (40.1)	6.0 (42.8)	10.5 (50.9)	17.3 (63.1)	24.6 (76.3)	27.0 (80.6)	29.2 (84.6)	27.2 (81.0)	21.6 (70.9)	14.8 (58.6)	8.6 (47.5)	5.8 (42.4)	30.1 (86.2)
Mean daily maximum °C (°F)	−4.3 (24.3)	−2.4 (27.7)	3.3 (37.9)	9.3 (48.7)	15.7 (60.3)	19.5 (67.1)	22.6 (72.7)	20.3 (68.5)	15.0 (59.0)	7.2 (45.0)	1.1 (34.0)	−2.0 (28.4)	8.8 (47.8)
Daily mean °C (°F)	−8.1 (17.4)	−7.0 (19.4)	−2.4 (27.7)	3.3 (37.9)	9.1 (48.4)	13.1 (55.6)	16.2 (61.2)	14.2 (57.6)	9.5 (49.1)	2.9 (37.2)	−1.9 (28.6)	−5.5 (22.1)	3.6 (38.5)
Mean daily minimum °C (°F)	−12.1 (10.2)	−11.2 (11.8)	−7.4 (18.7)	−2.4 (27.7)	2.2 (36.0)	6.5 (43.7)	9.8 (49.6)	8.5 (47.3)	4.9 (40.8)	−0.6 (30.9)	−4.8 (23.4)	−9.3 (15.3)	−1.3 (29.6)
Mean minimum °C (°F)	−26.3 (−15.3)	−25.4 (−13.7)	−20.8 (−5.4)	−10.0 (14.0)	−4.6 (23.7)	−0.1 (31.8)	3.4 (38.1)	1.6 (34.9)	−2.5 (27.5)	−9.8 (14.4)	−15.9 (3.4)	−22.6 (−8.7)	−29.3 (−20.7)
Record low °C (°F)	−43.0 (−45.4)	−42.5 (−44.5)	−31.4 (−24.5)	−18.0 (−0.4)	−7.8 (18.0)	−2.5 (27.5)	−0.2 (31.6)	−2.2 (28.0)	−9.8 (14.4)	−19.8 (−3.6)	−30.0 (−22.0)	−40.0 (−40.0)	−43.0 (−45.4)
Average precipitation mm (inches)	42.2 (1.66)	24.5 (0.96)	22.7 (0.89)	29.6 (1.17)	47.8 (1.88)	54.6 (2.15)	73.4 (2.89)	78.2 (3.08)	54.9 (2.16)	53.2 (2.09)	40.3 (1.59)	51.2 (2.02)	572.6 (22.54)
Source 1: SMHI Open Data
Source 2: SMHI climate data 2002–2018

Climate data for Sollefteå 1991-2020 extrapolation
Month	Jan	Feb	Mar	Apr	May	Jun	Jul	Aug	Sep	Oct	Nov	Dec	Year
Mean daily maximum °C (°F)	−3.1 (26.4)	−2.2 (28.0)	3.6 (38.5)	9.6 (49.3)	15.8 (60.4)	20.4 (68.7)	23.1 (73.6)	20.9 (69.6)	15.5 (59.9)	7.6 (45.7)	1.5 (34.7)	−2.2 (28.0)	9.2 (48.6)
Daily mean °C (°F)	−7.3 (18.9)	−6.9 (19.6)	−1.7 (28.9)	3.9 (39.0)	9.3 (48.7)	14.1 (57.4)	17.0 (62.6)	15.4 (59.7)	10.5 (50.9)	3.9 (39.0)	−1.4 (29.5)	−6.0 (21.2)	4.2 (39.6)
Mean daily minimum °C (°F)	−11.5 (11.3)	−11.6 (11.1)	−6.9 (19.6)	−1.8 (28.8)	2.8 (37.0)	7.7 (45.9)	11.0 (51.8)	9.9 (49.8)	5.6 (42.1)	0.2 (32.4)	−4.3 (24.3)	−9.9 (14.2)	−0.7 (30.7)
Source 1: Sollefteå station 1961-1986
Source 2: Forse station 1961-2020

== Sports ==
The following sports clubs are located in Sollefteå:

- Sollefteå GIF
- Sollefteå Hockey
- Remsle UIF
- Sollefteå Handboll handball
- Sollefteå BTK Table tennis
- Sollefteå Skidor Cross-country skiing

== Notable people ==
- Nils Åkerblom (1895-1974), equestrian
- Adam Alsing (1968-2020), television and radio presenter
- Torsten Anderson (1904-1986), New Zealand wrestler
- Ingela Andersson (born 1991), biathlete
- Lena Asplund (born 1956), politician
- Emil Assergård (born 1991), singer-songwriter
- Urban Bäckström (born 1954), former Governor of the Bank of Sweden, president of the Confederation of Swedish Enterprise
- Olle Dahlberg (1928–1997), speed skater
- Helena Ekholm (born 1984), biathlete
- Jan Eriksson (born 1958), ice hockey player
- Ulf Eriksson (born 1942), association football referee
- Margareta Fahlén (1918-1978), actress
- Laura Fitinghoff (1848-1908), writer
- Thomas Gradin (born 1956), ice hockey scout and former player
- Anton Halén (born 1990), handball player
- Gunnar Hedlund (1900-1989), politician
- Göran Högberg (1948-2019), long distance runner
- Erika Höghede (born 1963), actress
- Emma Johansson (born 1983), cyclist. Won two Olympic silver medals.
- Joacim Jonsson (born 1974), former football player and manager
- Magnus Jonsson (born 1982), biathlete
- Frida Karlsson (born 1999), cross-country skier
- Sven O. Kullander (born 1952), biologist
- Rune Lindström (born 1944), alpine skier
- Lennart Ljung (1921-1990), former Supreme Commander Of The Swedish Armed Forces
- Bo Lundquist (born 1942), businessman
- Karl-Göran Mäler (1939-2020), economist
- Andreas Molinder (born 1987), ice hockey player
- Mats O. Nyberg (born 1958), curler and curling coach
- Johan Nyström (born 1975), swimmer
- Marie-Helene Östlund (born 1966), cross-country skier
- Mona Sahlin (born 1957), former chairman of Swedish Social Democratic Party and Member of Parliament
- Therese Sjölander (born 1981), ice hockey player
- Maj Sønstevold (1917 – 1996), composer
- Gerhard Strindlund (1890–1957), politician
- Pär Styf (born 1979), ice hockey player
- Per Svartvadet (born 1975), ice hockey player
- Helen Svedin (born 1976), supermodel, wife of Luís Figo
- Madelein Svensson (born 1969), race walker
- Pelle Svensson (1943-2020), lawyer and wrestler
- Ellen Tejle (born 1984), campaigner for awareness of women's representation in film
- Ingrid Thulin (1926-2004), actress
- Mattias Timander (born 1974), ice hockey player
- Mikael Tjallden (born 1975), ice hockey player
- Kristina Ulander (born 1981), wheelchair curler
- Lars Vågberg (born 1967), Norwegian curler
- William Wallinder (born 2002), ice hockey player
- Ann-Cathrine Wiklander (born 1958), singer

== Sister city ==
- Madison, Mississippi

Madison has been Sollefteå's sister city since 1997. Talks began in 1995 when Madison officials were meeting with the board of Sollefteå-based forestry products company, Haglof, Inc, for the latter was interested in opening a plant in Madison. The Madison officials came to Sollefteå and were more interested to learn about Swedish culture.

A delegation of 30 members of the city of Sollefteå's board came to Madison to tour the city and make the sister city relationship official. During the visit, Haglof opened its new office in Madison, and another Swedish company, Mini Tube, was also interested in opening offices in Madison.

After the people of the delegation of Sollefteå came to Madison, the latter sent 34 delegates to Sollefteå, once again to tour the city. The Madison delegates learned about Swedish culture and traditions, came to Haglof Inc.'s facilities, and toured an environmental center.

Because of Sollefteå's and Madison's relationship, the Swedish-American Chamber of Commerce was created in the latter.

== Gallery ==
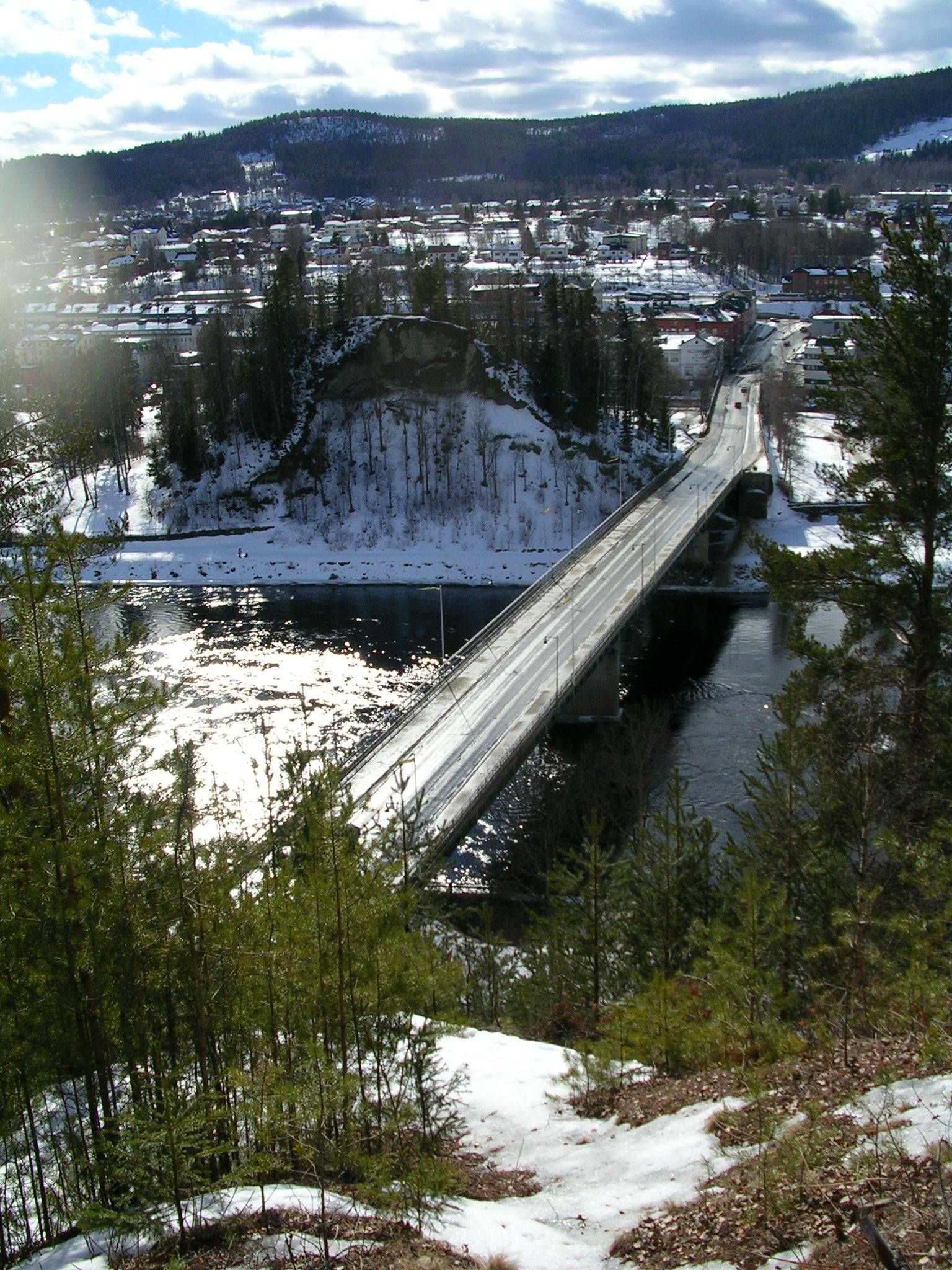
Northern entrance to Sollefteå, crossing Ångermanälven
