= Luís Figo =

Portuguese footballer (born 1972)

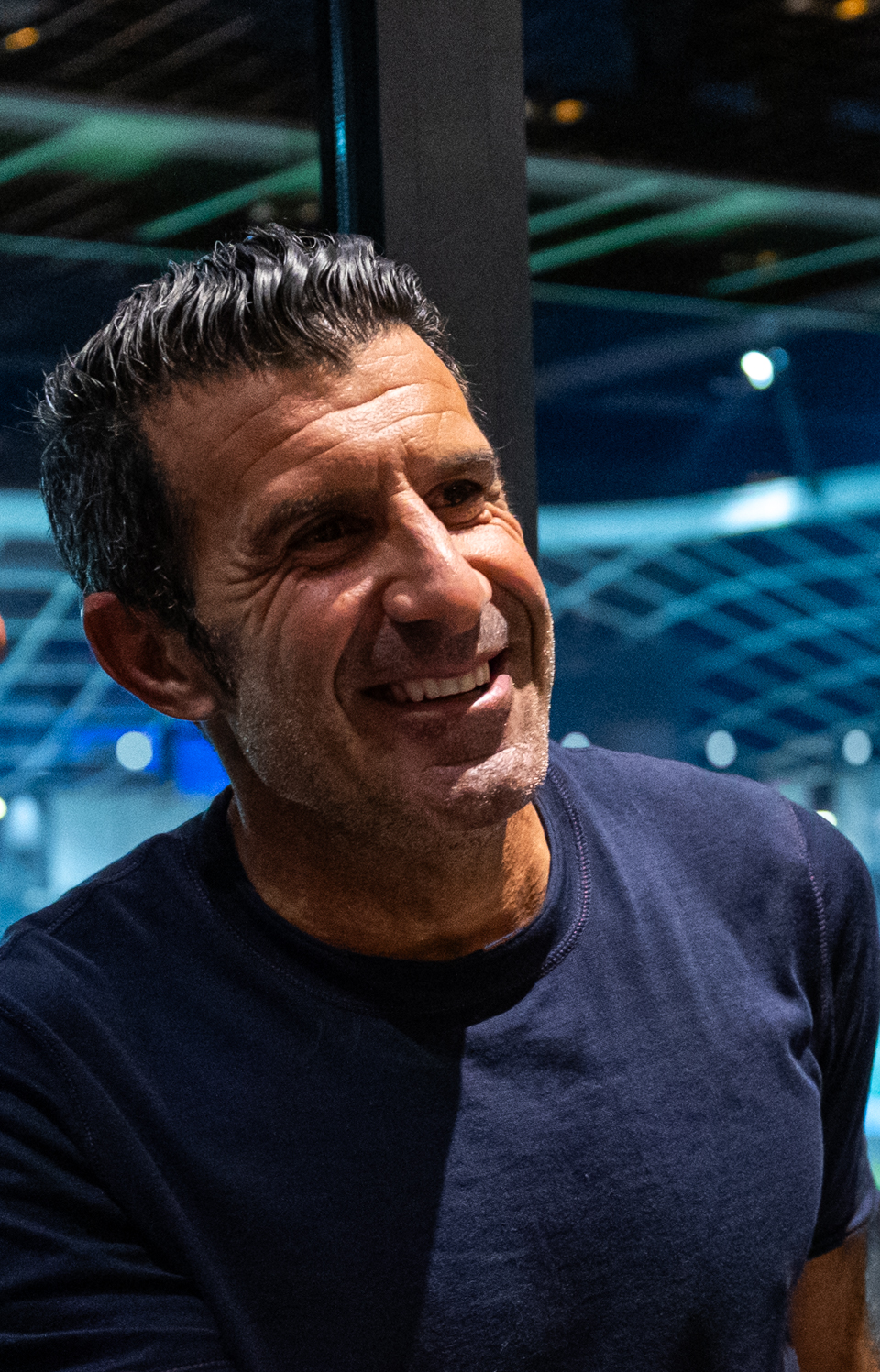
- Figo in 2023

Personal information
- Full name: Luís Filipe Madeira Caeiro Figo
- Date of birth: 4 November 1972 (age 54)
- Place of birth: Almada, Portugal
- Height: 1.80 m (5 ft 11 in)
- Position: Winger

Youth career
- 1984–1985: Os Pastilhas
- 1985–1989: Sporting CP

Senior career*
Years	Team	Apps	(Gls)
1989–1995	Sporting CP	129	(16)
1995–2000	Barcelona	172	(30)
2000–2005	Real Madrid	164	(38)
2005–2009	Inter Milan	105	(9)
Total		570	(93)

International career
1988–1989	Portugal 16	15	(8)
1988–1990	Portugal 18	21	(8)
1989	Portugal 17	6	(2)
1990–1991	Portugal U20	12	(0)
1991	Portugal U19	1	(0)
1991–1994	Portugal U21	7	(0)
1991–2006	Portugal	127	(32)
Medal record
Men's football
Representing Portugal
FIFA U-20 World Cup
Winner	1991 Portugal
UEFA European Under-16 Championship
Winner	1989 Denmark
Runner-up	1988 Spain
UEFA European Championship
Runner-up	2004 Portugal
Third place	2000 Belgium/Netherlands
UEFA European Under-21 Championship
Runner-up	1994 France
UEFA European Under-18 Championship
Runner-up	1990 Hungary
FIFA U-17 World Cup
Third place	1989 Scotland
- * Club domestic league appearances and goals

Luís Filipe Madeira Caeiro Figo OIH (Portuguese pronunciation: [luˈiʃ ˈfiɣu]; born 4 November 1972) is a Portuguese former professional footballer who played as a winger for Sporting CP, Barcelona, Real Madrid, and Inter Milan. He won 127 caps for the Portugal national team, a one-time record. Figo is widely regarded as one of the best players of his generation and one of the greatest wingers in the history of the sport. He ranks second for the all-time Portuguese top assist providers in the UEFA Champions League (15).

Figo won the 2000 Ballon d'Or, 2001 FIFA World Player of the Year, and in 2004 Pelé named him in the FIFA 100 list of the world's greatest living players. Figo is one of the few football players to have played for both Spanish rival clubs Barcelona and Real Madrid. His transfer from Barcelona to Real Madrid in 2000 set a world record fee of €62 million.

Figo had a very successful career highlighted by several trophy wins, including the Portuguese Cup, four La Liga titles, two Spanish Cups, three Spanish Super Cups, one Champions League title, one UEFA Cup Winners' Cup, two UEFA Super Cups, one Intercontinental Cup, four Serie A titles, one Italian Cup, and three Italian Super Cups. At international level, he scored 32 goals for Portugal, representing the nation at three European Championships and two World Cups, helping them reach the final but finish as runners-up at Euro 2004, as well as reaching the semi-finals at the 2006 World Cup.

== Early years ==
The only child of António Caeiro Figo and Maria Joana Pestana Madeira who moved from Alentejo to Lisbon in the early 1970s, Figo grew up in the working-class district of Cova da Piedade, Almada. He began his career as a street footballer at Os Pastilhas, before joining the academy of Sporting CP at the age of 12. In his youth, Figo played futsal from which he learned a lot of skills that helped him later in his career.

== Club career ==
=== Sporting CP ===
Figo started his career at Sporting CP, making his league debut on 2 April 1990 during the 1989–90 season as a substitute for Marlon Brandão in a 1–0 home win against Marítimo. On 7 December 1991, Figo scored his first goal against Torreense in the 1991–92 season, equalising as Sporting won 2–1. He won his first senior international cap in 1991. Prior to that, he won the 1991 FIFA Under-20 World Championships and Under-16 European Championships with Portugal junior sides alongside Rui Costa and João Pinto. He was also a significant part of Portugal's "Golden Generation". In his final season at Sporting he won the 1994–95 Portuguese Cup.

=== Barcelona ===
In 1995, Figo looked poised to join one of the big clubs of Europe, but a dispute between Italian clubs Juventus and Parma, with Figo having signed contracts with both clubs, resulted in an Italian two-year transfer ban on him. Eventually, Figo made a move to Spanish giants Barcelona for a £2.25 million fee, being loaned back for the remainder of the season due to a rule prohibiting Portuguese players from signing for foreign clubs outside a fixed period. This rule had prevented Figo from joining English club Manchester City, where he had been recommended by his former Sporting manager Malcolm Allison for a fee of around £1.2 million.

It was with Barcelona that Figo's career really took off, winning the 1996–97 UEFA Cup Winners' Cup, starring alongside Ronaldo, followed by successive Primera División titles where he was part of a formidable attack that included Rivaldo and Patrick Kluivert. In total, Figo appeared 172 times in the league for Barcelona, scoring 30 goals. He was revered in Barcelona because his presence had given Catalonia a sense of external approval.

=== Real Madrid ===
In July 2000, Figo made a surprising and controversial €62 million move to Barcelona's bitter rivals Real Madrid. Real Madrid met the buyout clause in Figo's contract at Barcelona, a new world record fee, and his arrival at Madrid signalled the beginning of Florentino Pérez's Galáctico era of global stars signed by the club every year. Figo became the new focus of the Barcelona–Real Madrid rivalry, with Barcelona fans feeling betrayed by his transfer and turning against him. His move to Madrid was significant due to his status as a star player at Barcelona, reliable, and always committed to the cause as a team leader. One of his Barcelona teammates stated, "Our plan was simple: give the ball to Luís. He never, ever hid". Although now wearing the white shirt of Real Madrid, he won the Ballon d'Or award in November 2000, largely for what he did for Barcelona, where he became the best in the world.

By the second or third corner I turned to Luís Figo and said: 'Forget it, mate. You're on your own'. I used to offer Luís the chance to take the short corner, drawing up close to him near the touchline, but not this time. Missiles were raining down from the stands: coins, a knife, a glass whiskey bottle. Johnnie Walker, I think. Or J&B. Best to keep away. Short corners? No thanks.

— Real Madrid teammate Michel Salgado on the vitriol aimed at Figo from Barcelona fans at the Camp Nou, 23 November 2002.

When Figo returned to Barcelona for the first time in a Real Madrid shirt on 21 October 2000, the noise at the Camp Nou was deafening. There were banners hung around the stadium with words like "Traitor", "Judas", "Scum", and "Mercenary". Figo was mercilessly taunted throughout, and when he came out of the tunnel and ran onto the field the jeers of almost 98,000 Barcelona fans escalated, with a visibly shocked Figo putting his fingers to his ears. When El Clásico started, each time Figo got the ball the noise rose with insults and missiles flying such as oranges, bottles, cigarette lighters and mobile phones. The regular corner taker for Madrid, Figo did not take any corners at the Camp Nou to avoid being in proximity to the fans. Barcelona were victorious, winning 2–0, and Real Madrid President Florentino Pérez stated after the match, "The atmosphere got to us all." Madrid defender Iván Campo commented,

"That night when Figo first went back was incredible. I’ve never heard anything like it. Luís didn't deserve that. He'd given his all for Barcelona. It was built up before: 'a traitor’s coming,' the media said. No, Luís Figo is coming, one of the greats for you. That night hurt him, you could see. His head was bowed and he was thinking: 'bloody hell, I was here last season ...' But my lasting emotion was admiration: you’ve got balls."

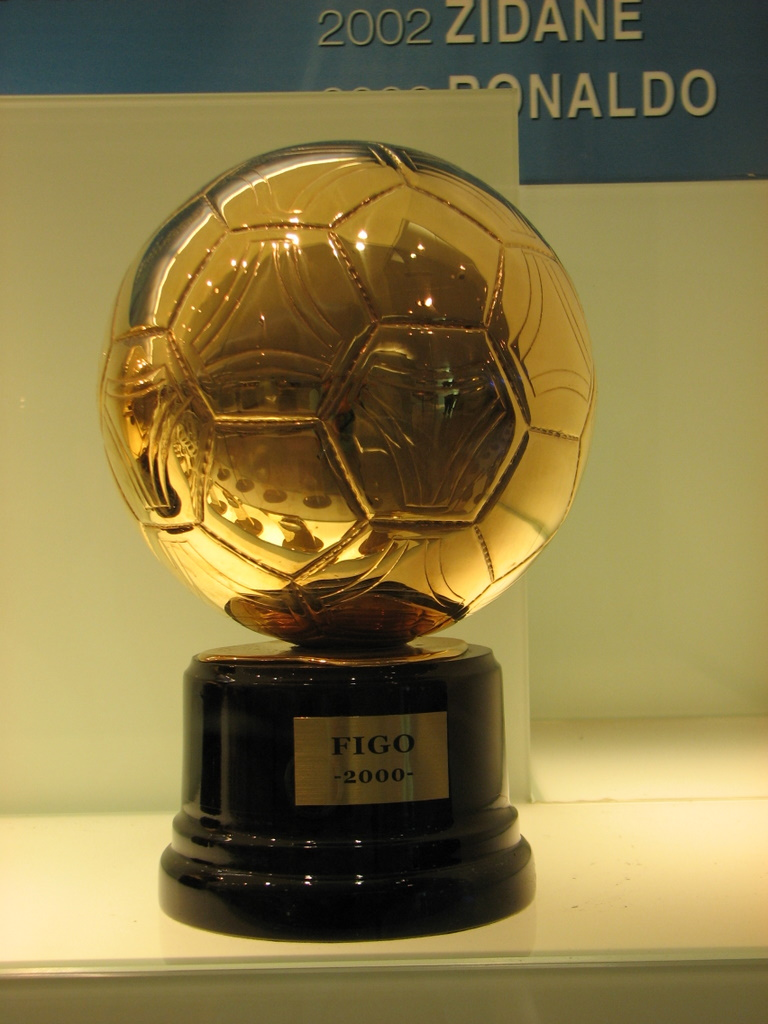
Figo's 2000 Ballon d'Or. He received the award for his displays throughout the year for Barcelona and then Madrid.

In his first season with Madrid, Figo won the 2001 La Liga title, scoring 14 goals in all competitions. For his performances at Real, he was designated the 2001 FIFA World Player of the Year. He would be joined at the club by Zinedine Zidane in the middle of 2001, and in the following season Madrid won the 2001–02 UEFA Champions League. He missed two fixtures against Barcelona through injury and suspension.

Figo's second game back at the Camp Nou, on 23 November 2002, produced one of the defining images of the Barcelona–Real Madrid rivalry. There was no sign of the hatred or the hurt subsiding, and every time he came within range of the Barcelona fans, beer cans, lighters, bottles and golf balls flew. Figo commented: "I was worried that some madman might lose his head." This time, Figo had decided that he would take corners, as well as throw-ins, and midway through the second half Madrid won a corner. Amid a shower of flying objects, it took Figo two minutes to take it. Another corner followed on the other side, and as Figo walked across, he slowed to pick up the missiles and as he prepared to take the corner he moved away some of the debris while giving an ironic thumbs-up and smiling. Every time he began his run-up to take the corner, another missile would land which was repeated over and over, until the referee Luis Medina Cantalejo suspended the game for almost 20 minutes. During the break in play, the defining image of the rivalry, a pig's head, was picked up on camera, which was in among the debris near the corner flag.

Figo would spend five seasons at Madrid, with his final success being the 2003 La Liga title. In April 2013, Figo was named by the sports newspaper Marca as a member of the "Best foreign eleven in Real Madrid's history".

=== Inter Milan ===
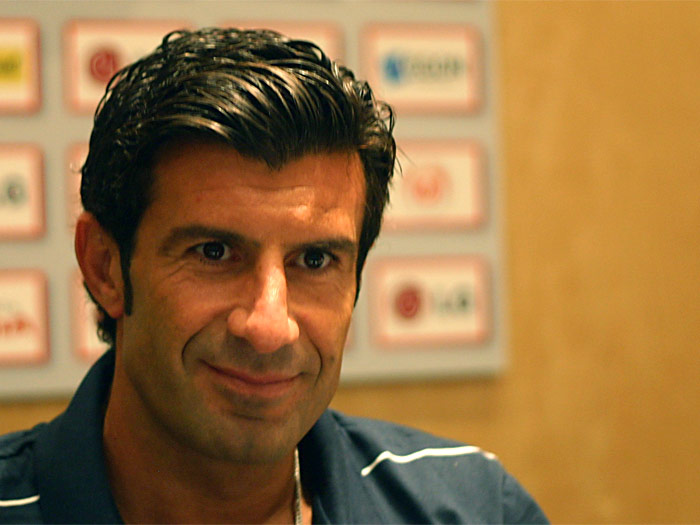
Figo in 2009. He spent four seasons at Inter from 2005 to 2009.

Figo left Real Madrid to join the Italian club Inter Milan in the middle of 2005 on a free transfer after his contract with Madrid had expired. This meant that Figo would finally be able to play for a club in Italy, something he had the chance to do before his move to Barcelona, but was scuppered due to a dispute between the two clubs interested, Juventus and Parma. During the middle of 2008, Figo's compatriot José Mourinho joined Inter as manager. This has been said to please Figo, as he would have several Portuguese teammates during the remainder of his stay at Inter. On 16 May 2009, Figo announced his retirement from football, the same day Inter won the 2008–09 title, and re-confirmed this on 30 May; his final game was on 31 May against Atalanta at the San Siro. At Javier Zanetti's insistence, Figo captained the side for his last match. He received a standing ovation from the crowd as he was substituted by Davide Santon. The free-kick he scored in extra time against Roma during the Supercoppa Italiana was his most memorable moment in Italy.

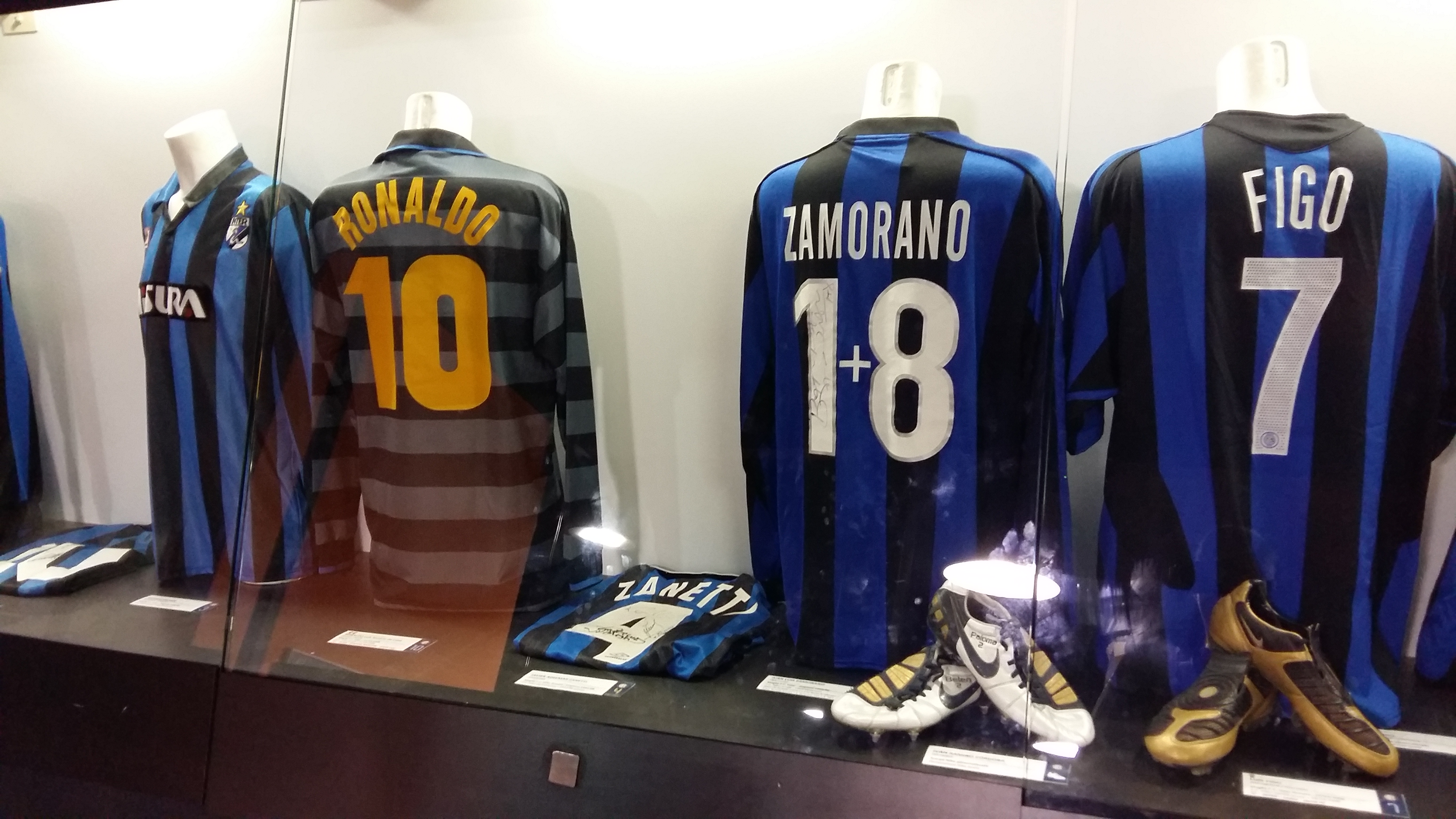
Figo's number 7 Inter jersey next to Ronaldo (number 10) and Zamorano (one plus eight) in the San Siro museum

Figo said: "I am leaving football, not Inter." He was interviewed by the Inter Channel after his last game against Atalanta, and also said: "I hope to be able to help this club to become even greater also after my retirement. I will certainly work for Inter in the future on the club board. I never imagined that I was going to remain here for such a long time. What I will never forget is the love that I have received since my first day here from my teammates and president Massimo Moratti. I will never forget it; Inter has given me the chance to start a winning cycle with some extraordinary people." Figo was on the sidelines when Inter won the 2009–10 UEFA Champions League on 22 May 2010.

== International career ==
=== Early international career ===
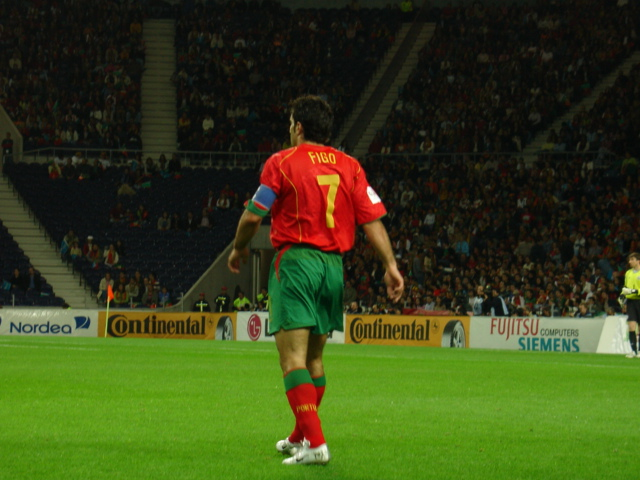
Figo as captain of Portugal in 2005

The leader of Portugal's "Golden Generation", Figo won a FIFA World Youth Championship in 1991, the same year he made his senior debut against Luxembourg on 16 October 1991, in a friendly match that ended 1–1 when he was only 18 years old. His first goal equalised in a 2–1 friendly victory over Bulgaria in Paris on 11 November 1992. Figo scored three goals in eight qualifying games for UEFA Euro 1996, as his country reached the continental tournament for the first time in 12 years. In the final group game at the tournament, against Croatia at the City Ground in Nottingham, Figo opened a 3–0 victory with a fourth-minute strike; the result sent Portugal into the quarter-finals as group winners ahead of their opponents.

=== Euro 2000 and 2002 World Cup ===
Figo featured in all ten of Portugal's qualifiers for the next European Championship, scoring three times in the process. On 12 June 2000, in their opening game of the tournament in Eindhoven, he scored Portugal's first goal as they came from behind to beat England 3–2, again advancing as group winners to be eliminated in the semi-finals. He was rested by Humberto Coelho for the final group match against Germany in Rotterdam, breaking a chain of 32 consecutive international appearances. His only hat-trick for the national team came on 15 August 2001, when he netted all of the goals in a 3–0 friendly victory over Moldova at the Estádio de São Luís in Faro.

With six goals in nine matches, Figo helped Portugal qualify for the 2002 FIFA World Cup; on 2 June 2001, in the qualifier against the Republic of Ireland at Lansdowne Road, he served as captain for the first time on his 74th cap and scored the equaliser for a 1–1 draw. In their first World Cup since 1986, Portugal suffered group stage elimination while Figo failed to score a goal.

=== Euro 2004 and 2006 World Cup ===
On 18 February 2004, Figo earned his 100th cap in a 1–1 friendly draw with England at the Estádio Algarve, playing as captain despite regular skipper Fernando Couto being in the starting line-up. Later that year at the European Championship on home soil, he captained the side after Couto was dropped. He announced his retirement from international football following the Euro 2004 final upset-defeat by Greece due to an alleged rift between him and national coach Luiz Felipe Scolari, although this was denied. In June 2005, he reversed his decision and returned for the 2006 World Cup qualifying wins against Slovakia and Estonia under Scolari.

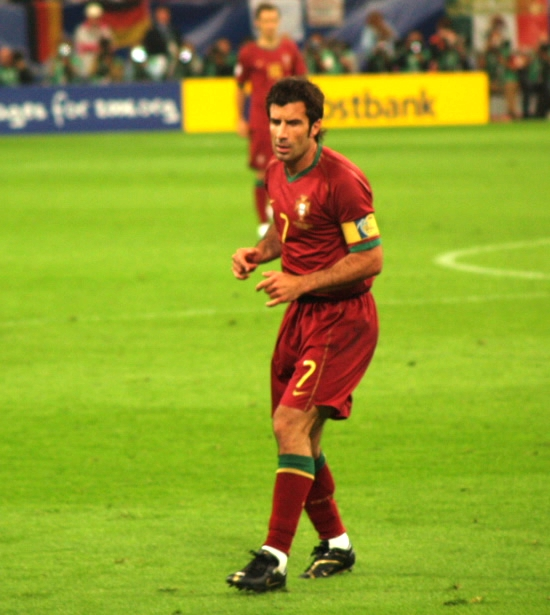
Figo playing against Mexico at the 2006 World Cup

Figo captained the squad during the 2006 World Cup, leading the team to the semi-finals. With three wins, Portugal finished top of their group and qualified for the knock-out rounds with Mexico. They advanced past the Netherlands in the last 16, and defeated England on penalties in the quarter-final. Figo did not take part in the shootout, having been substituted for Hélder Postiga. In the semi-final, Portugal was beaten by France courtesy of a penalty from his former club-mate and French captain Zinedine Zidane. This was Portugal's best finish in 40 years. The third-place playoff caused some controversy as Figo did not start; Pauleta captained the team in his place. However, Portugal fell behind 2–0 to hosts Germany and Figo replaced Pauleta in the 77th minute, who handed him back the captain's armband to cheers from both Portuguese and German fans. Although Germany scored another goal shortly after Figo's entrance, he ended his final cap for his country on a high note by setting up Nuno Gomes to head in an 88th-minute consolation goal, thus passing his number 7 jersey down to his successor, Cristiano Ronaldo.

Despite having no trophies to show for the "Golden Generation", Figo managed to captain the team to their best World Cup performance since the Eusébio era in 1966, as well as helping Portugal to their best-ever result in the UEFA European Championship until they won it in 2016. He finished his international career with 127 caps and scoring 32 goals, and held the record until June 2016 for most appearances with the Portugal national team; he is also Portugal's fourth-highest all-time goalscorer.

== Style of play ==
Figo is widely regarded as one of the best players of his generation and one of the greatest wingers in the history of the sport. At his physical peak, Figo was a quick, elegant, highly skillful player with close control, acceleration, and a dribbling ability that allowed him to frequently take on and beat defenders in one on one situations. He would often employ feints to beat opponents, such as stepovers. Although naturally right-footed, he was capable of using either foot. Figo was usually deployed as a winger in his early career, where he was capable of providing several assists, due to his ability to provide curling crosses to teammates from the right flank, or cut inside, drift onto the left, or link-up with midfielders, and create goalscoring opportunities.

As he lost pace and mobility with age as his career advanced, he was deployed in a playmaking role as an attacking midfielder, in particular during his time with Inter, where he excelled with his vision, intelligence and varied passing ability. Although he primarily served as a creative player, he was also capable of contributing offensively with goals due to his powerful striking ability from distance, as well as his accuracy from free-kicks and penalties. In addition to his football ability, Figo was also highly regarded for his leadership throughout his career.

== Media ==
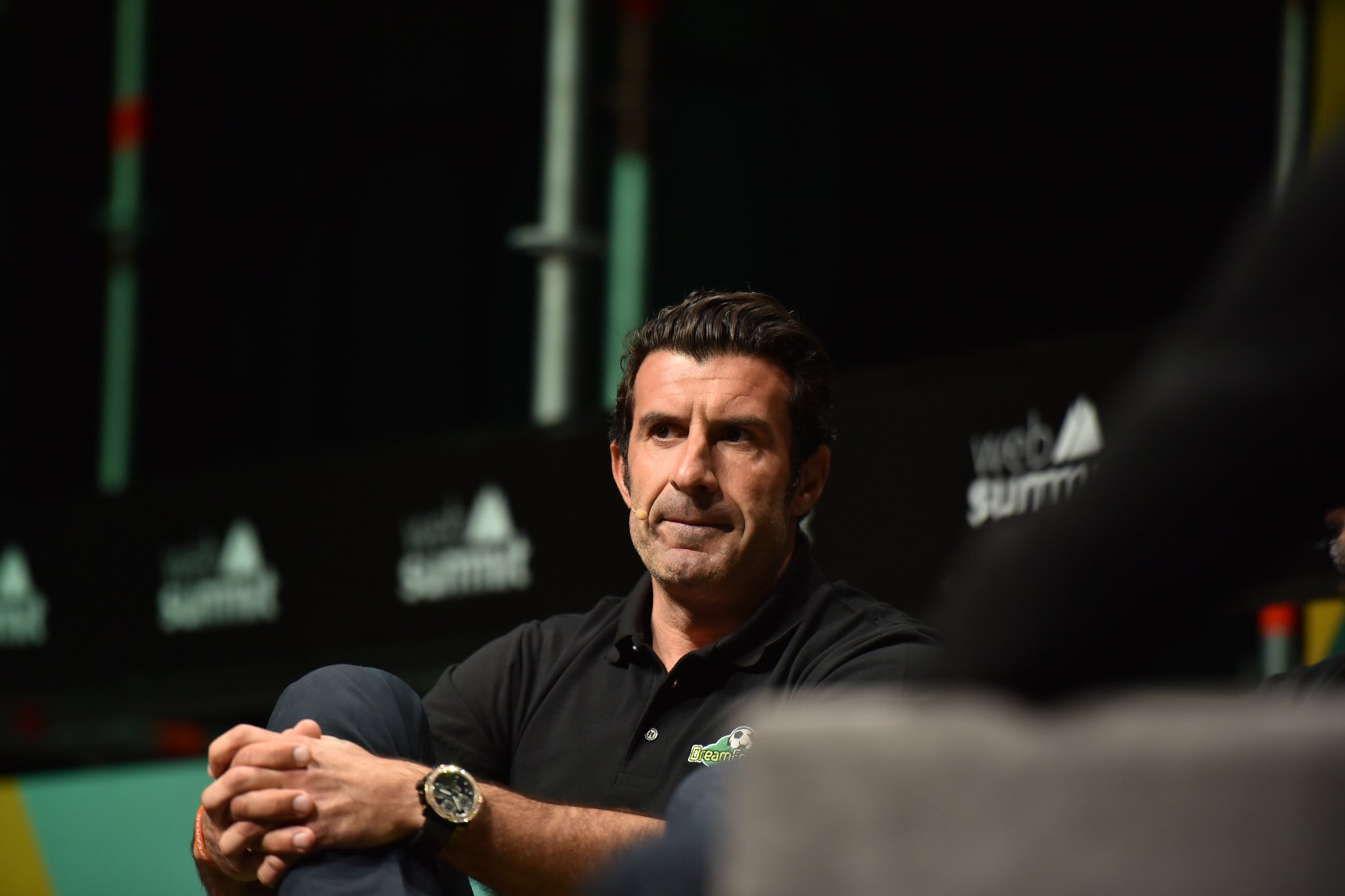
Figo on stage at the Web Summit in November 2016

Figo has appeared in commercials for the sportswear company Nike. In 1996, he starred in a Nike commercial titled "Good vs Evil" in a gladiatorial game set in a Roman amphitheatre. Appearing alongside football players from around the world, including Ronaldo, Paolo Maldini, Ian Wright, Eric Cantona, Patrick Kluivert and Jorge Campos, they defend "the beautiful game" against a team of demonic warriors, before it culminates with Cantona striking the ball and destroying evil. In a global Nike advertising campaign in the run-up to the 2002 World Cup in Korea and Japan, Figo starred in a "Secret Tournament" commercial (branded by Nike as "Scorpion KO") directed by Terry Gilliam, appearing alongside football players such as Thierry Henry, Ronaldinho, Francesco Totti, Roberto Carlos and Japanese star Hidetoshi Nakata, with former player Eric Cantona the tournament "referee". Figo features in EA Sports' FIFA video game series; he was named in the Ultimate Team Legends in FIFA 14. In 2015, the arcade game company Konami announced that Figo would feature in their football video game Pro Evolution Soccer 2016 as one of the new myClub Legends. In 2018, Figo was added as an icon to the Ultimate Team in FIFA 19. He has also taken part in several Iranian television shows such as Navad TV during the 2018 World Cup draw, together with Hamid Estili and former Hamburg player Mehdi Mahdavikia.

In August 2022, Netflix launched El Caso Figo (The Figo Affair), a documentary about Figo's transfer from Barcelona to Real Madrid.

== FIFA presidency campaign ==
On 28 January 2015, Figo announced his intention to run against incumbent Sepp Blatter for the position of FIFA president. His endorsers included José Mourinho and David Beckham. In his manifesto, Figo mentioned his support for expanding the World Cup to 48-team finals tournaments, and promised greater investment in grassroots football and national federations. Considered an outsider compared to Blatter and the other two candidates – Michael van Praag and Prince Ali bin Hussein – Figo withdrew from the election campaign on 21 May, stating that he did not want to be given "absolute power".

== Personal life ==
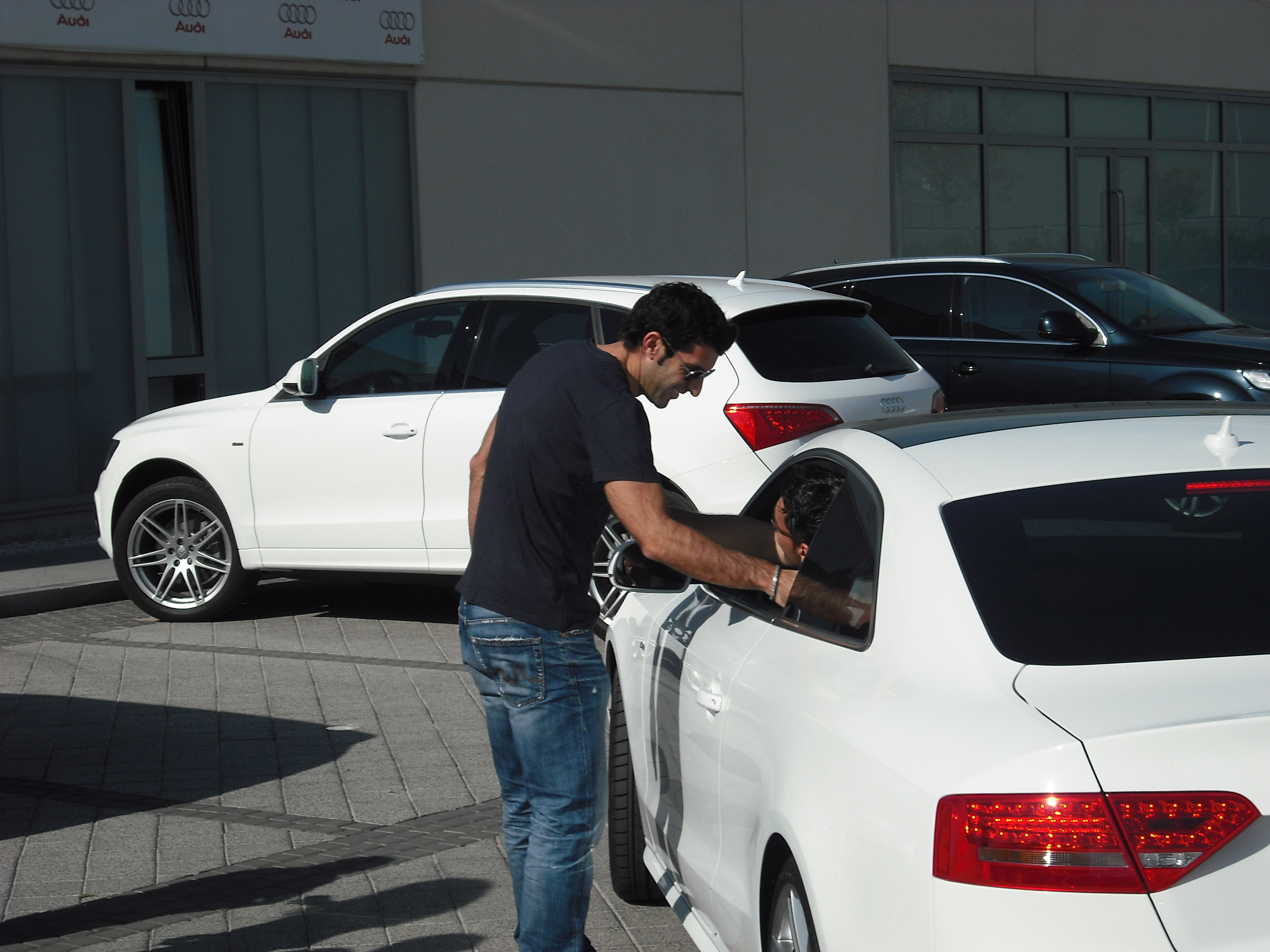
Figo in Madrid in 2009

Figo is married to Swedish model Helen Svedin. The couple had three daughters, Daniela (born in 1999), Martina (born in 2002), and Stella (born in 2004).

While at Sporting, before leaving Portugal to sign with Barcelona, Luís Figo reached the 11th grade of formal education. He finished secondary school (12th grade) in Portugal at the age of 38, in 2011, through the special New Opportunities (Novas Oportunidades) skills certification programme for adults, which was set up by his socialist acquaintance José Sócrates when Sócrates was Prime Minister of Portugal. He also studied business management through a nine-month course at IESE in Madrid.

Figo is fluent in five languages: Portuguese, Spanish, English, Italian and French. He has also congratulated his wife on her birthday on Instagram in Swedish, although he has never spoken the language in media appearances.

== Other activities ==
=== Business ventures ===
Along with his countryman, former Portugal national team manager and former youth team coach Carlos Queiroz, Figo was briefly joint seat holder for A1 Team Portugal, in A1 Grand Prix, during the 2005–06 season.

Luís Figo also operates businesses in the hotel, fashion, catering, mining and wine sectors. He is co-owner of an upscale bar in Vilamoura and an hotel in Carvoeiro, both located in the Algarve region of Portugal. In 2010, a year after leaving football playing, he attended the International Mining Fair in Dakar, the capital of Senegal, and it was then that he decided to open a company to dedicate himself to the mining business, Damash Assets, based in Almada, which has earned him annual profits. His wife is his partner in the company Damash Assets.

Figo is the founder of Network90, a private members' networking site for the Professional Football Industry.

=== Charity works ===
Figo is an ambassador for the Stop TB Partnership in the fight against tuberculosis. He works closely with Inter Milan, serving as an ambassador for the club at functions across Europe. He is also a board member of the Inter Campus charity project run by Inter Milan.

In 2003, Figo established the Fundação Luís Figo (Luís Figo Foundation) in Portugal, a charity which is headquartered in Lisbon and supports children with special needs and children subjected to poverty.

=== Baller League UK ===
In November 2024, it was announced that he's set to manage Trebol FC in the upcoming Baller League UK, a six-a-side football league.

== Career statistics ==
=== Club ===
Appearances and goals by club, season and competition
Club	Season	League			National cup (Note: Includes Taça de Portugal, Copa del Rey, Coppa Italia)		Europe		Other		Total	
Club	Season	Division	Apps	Goals	Apps	Goals	Apps	Goals	Apps	Goals	Apps	Goals
Sporting CP	1989–90	Primeira Divisão	3	0	—		—		—		3	0
Sporting CP	1990–91	Primeira Divisão	0	0	—		—		—		0	0
Sporting CP	1991–92	Primeira Divisão	34	1	2	0	2 (Note: Appearances in UEFA Cup)	0	—		38	1
Sporting CP	1992–93	Primeira Divisão	32	0	5	0	2	0	—		39	0
Sporting CP	1993–94	Primeira Divisão	31	8	6	3	5	0	—		42	11
Sporting CP	1994–95	Primeira Divisão	29	7	5	4	2	0	—		36	11
Sporting CP	Total		129	16	18	7	11	0	—		158	23
Barcelona	1995–96	La Liga	35	5	7	0	10	3	—		52	8
Barcelona	1996–97	La Liga	36	4	5	3	8 (Note: Appearances in UEFA Cup Winners' Cup)	1	1 (Note: Appearance(s) in Supercopa de España)	0	50	8
Barcelona	1997–98	La Liga	35	5	6	1	7 (Note: Appearances in UEFA Champions League)	1	3 (Note: One appearance in Supercopa de España, two appearances in UEFA Super Cup)	0	51	7
Barcelona	1998–99	La Liga	34	7	4	0	6	1	1	0	45	8
Barcelona	1999–2000	La Liga	32	9	4	0	13	5	2	0	51	14
Barcelona	Total		172	30	26	4	44	11	7	0	249	45
Real Madrid	2000–01	La Liga	34	9	0	0	14	5	2 (Note: One appearance in UEFA Super Cup, one appearance in Intercontinental Cup)	0	50	14
Real Madrid	2001–02	La Liga	28	7	6	1	11	3	2	0	47	11
Real Madrid	2002–03	La Liga	33	10	1	0	15	2	2	0	51	12
Real Madrid	2003–04	La Liga	36	9	6	2	10	2	2	1	54	14
Real Madrid	2004–05	La Liga	33	3	0	0	10	4	—		43	7
Real Madrid	Total		164	38	13	3	60	16	8	1	245	58
Inter Milan	2005–06	Serie A	34	5	3	0	8	1	—		45	6
Inter Milan	2006–07	Serie A	32	2	7	0	7	0	1 (Note: Appearance in Supercoppa Italiana)	1	47	3
Inter Milan	2007–08	Serie A	17	1	1	0	3	0	1	0	22	1
Inter Milan	2008–09	Serie A	22	1	0	0	3	0	1	0	26	1
Inter Milan	Total		105	9	11	0	21	1	3	1	140	11
Career total			570	93	68	14	136	28	18	2	792	137

=== International ===
Appearances and goals by national team and year
National team	Year	Apps	Goals
Portugal	1991	3	0
Portugal	1992	7	1
Portugal	1993	5	0
Portugal	1994	5	2
Portugal	1995	6	1
Portugal	1996	9	2
Portugal	1997	7	2
Portugal	1998	6	0
Portugal	1999	9	4
Portugal	2000	13	6
Portugal	2001	9	9
Portugal	2002	10	0
Portugal	2003	10	3
Portugal	2004	11	1
Portugal	2005	7	0
Portugal	2006	10	1
Total		127	32

Scores and results list Portugal's goal tally first, score column indicates score after each Figo goal.

List of international goals scored by Luís Figo
No.	Date	Venue	Opponent	Score	Result	Competition
1	11 November 1992	Stade de Paris, Paris, France	Bulgaria	1–1	2–1	Friendly
2	9 October 1994	Daugava Stadium, Riga, Latvia	Latvia	3–0	3–1	UEFA Euro 1996 qualification
3	13 November 1994	Estádio José Alvalade, Lisbon, Portugal	Austria	1–0	1–0	UEFA Euro 1996 qualification
4	3 June 1995	Estádio das Antas, Porto, Portugal	Latvia	1–0	3–2	UEFA Euro 1996 qualification
5	19 June 1996	City Ground, Nottingham, England	Croatia	1–0	3–0	UEFA Euro 1996
6	9 October 1996	Qemal Stafa Stadium, Tirana, Albania	Albania	1–0	3–0	1998 FIFA World Cup qualification
7	7 June 1997	Estádio das Antas, Porto, Portugal	Albania	2–0	2–0	1998 FIFA World Cup qualification
8	20 August 1997	Estádio do Bonfim, Setúbal, Portugal	Armenia	2–0	3–1	1998 FIFA World Cup qualification
9	31 March 1999	Rheinpark Stadion, Vaduz, Liechtenstein	Liechtenstein	2–0	5–0	UEFA Euro 2000 qualification
10	18 August 1999	Estádio Nacional, Lisbon, Portugal	Andorra	3–0	4–0	Friendly
11	4 September 1999	Tofiq Bahramov Republican Stadium, Baku, Azerbaijan	Azerbaijan	1–1	1–1	UEFA Euro 2000 qualification
12	8 September 1999	Stadionul Steaua, Bucharest, Romania	Romania	1–1	1–1	UEFA Euro 2000 qualification
13	29 March 2000	Estádio Dr. Magalhães Pessoa, Leiria, Portugal	Denmark	2–1	2–1	Friendly
14	2 June 2000	Estádio Municipal de Chaves, Chaves, Portugal	Wales	1–0	3–0	Friendly
15	12 June 2000	Philips Stadion, Eindhoven, Netherlands	England	1–2	3–2	UEFA Euro 2000
16	16 August 2000	Estádio do Fontelo, Viseu, Portugal	Lithuania	1–0	5–1	Friendly
17	3 September 2000	Kadriorg Stadium, Tallinn, Estonia	Estonia	2–0	3–1	2002 FIFA World Cup qualification
18	15 November 2000	Estádio 1º de Maio, Braga, Portugal	Israel	1–0	2–1	Friendly
19	28 February 2001	Estádio dos Barreiros, Funchal, Portugal	Andorra	2–0	3–0	2002 FIFA World Cup qualification
20	28 February 2001	Estádio dos Barreiros, Funchal, Portugal	Andorra	3–0	3–0	2002 FIFA World Cup qualification
21	28 March 2001	Estádio das Antas, Porto, Portugal	Netherlands	2–2	2–2	2002 FIFA World Cup qualification
22	2 June 2001	Lansdowne Road, Dublin, Republic of Ireland	Republic of Ireland	1–1	1–1	2002 FIFA World Cup qualification
23	15 August 2001	Estádio de São Luís, Faro, Portugal	Moldova	1–0	3–0	Friendly
24	15 August 2001	Estádio de São Luís, Faro, Portugal	Moldova	2–0	3–0	Friendly
25	15 August 2001	Estádio de São Luís, Faro, Portugal	Moldova	3–0	3–0	Friendly
26	6 October 2001	Estádio da Luz, Lisbon, Portugal	Estonia	5–0	5–0	2002 FIFA World Cup qualification
27	14 November 2001	Estádio José Alvalade, Lisbon, Portugal	Angola	1–1	5–1	Friendly
28	2 April 2003	Stade olympique de la Pontaise, Lausanne, Switzerland	Macedonia	1–0	1–0	Friendly
29	11 October 2003	Estádio do Restelo, Lisbon, Portugal	Albania	1–0	5–3	Friendly
30	19 November 2003	Estádio Dr. Magalhães Pessoa, Leiria, Portugal	Kuwait	3–0	8–0	Friendly
31	29 May 2004	Estádio Municipal de Águeda, Águeda, Portugal	Luxembourg	1–0	3–0	Friendly
32	3 June 2006	Stade Saint-Symphorien, Metz, France	Luxembourg	3–0	3–0	Friendly

== Honours ==
Sporting CP

- Taça de Portugal: 1994–95

Barcelona

- La Liga: 1997–98, 1998–99
- Copa del Rey: 1996–97, 1997–98
- Supercopa de España: 1996
- UEFA Cup Winners' Cup: 1996–97
- UEFA Super Cup: 1997

Real Madrid

- La Liga: 2000–01, 2002–03
- Supercopa de España: 2001, 2003
- UEFA Champions League: 2001–02
- UEFA Super Cup: 2002
- Intercontinental Cup: 2002

Inter Milan

- Serie A: 2005–06, 2006–07, 2007–08, 2008–09
- Coppa Italia: 2005–06
- Supercoppa Italiana: 2006, 2008

Portugal Youth

- UEFA European Under-16 Championship: 1989
- FIFA World Youth Championship: 1991

Portugal

- UEFA European Championship runner-up: 2004

Individual

- UEFA European Under-21 Championship Golden Player: 1994
- Portuguese Golden Ball: 1994
- Sporting CP Player of the Year: 1994
- Portuguese Footballer of the Year: 1995, 1996, 1997, 1998, 1999, 2000
- ESM Team of the Year: 1997–98, 1999–00
- La Liga top assist provider: 1998–99, 2000–01, 2002–03
- La Liga Foreign Player of the Year: 1999, 2000, 2001
- UEFA European Championship Team of the Tournament: 2000, 2004
- World Soccer Player of the Year: 2000
- Ballon d'Or: 2000
- FIFA World Player of the Year: 2001; silver award: 2000
- El País King of European Soccer: 2000
- RSSSF Player of the Year: 2000
- UEFA Champions League top assist provider: 2000–01, 2004–05
- UEFA Team of the Year: 2003
- FIFA World Cup All-Star Team: 2006
- Inter Milan Player of the Year: 2006
- FIFA 100
- Golden Foot: 2011, as football legend
- IFFHS Legends

Orders

- Officer of the Order of Prince Henry
- Knight of the Order of the Immaculate Conception of Vila Viçosa (House of Braganza)

== See also ==
- List of footballers with 100 or more UEFA Champions League appearances
- List of men's footballers with 100 or more international caps
