= Helen Svedin =

Swedish model

Helene Svedin
- Born: 21 October 1974 (age 51); Sollefteå, Sweden
- Spouse: Luís Figo
- Children: 3
- Modeling information
- Height: 1.76 m (5 ft 9 1/2 in)
- Hair color: Blonde
- Eye color: Blue
- Agency: Elite Model Management – New York City, SS&M Model Management, Munich Models, Wiener Models, Modelwerk, East West Models

Helene Svedin (born 21 October 1974) is a Swedish model known as the face of H&M. She is married to former Portuguese footballer Luís Figo. They met in 1996 at a Joaquín Cortés show in Barcelona. The couple had three daughters, Daniela (born 1999), Martina (born 2002) and Stella (born 2004). They live in Madrid.

Svedin has been in advertisements of Ana Sousa, Arena, Don Algodón, Friday's Project, Giorgio Armani, Guess, Isdin, Kia Motors, Land Rover, L'Oréal, Luciano Padovan, Nike, Vista Alegre, and Schwarzkopf. She has appeared on the covers of GQ, Elle, Telva, Marie Claire, and Woman.
