= Torsåker Parish, Diocese of Härnösand =

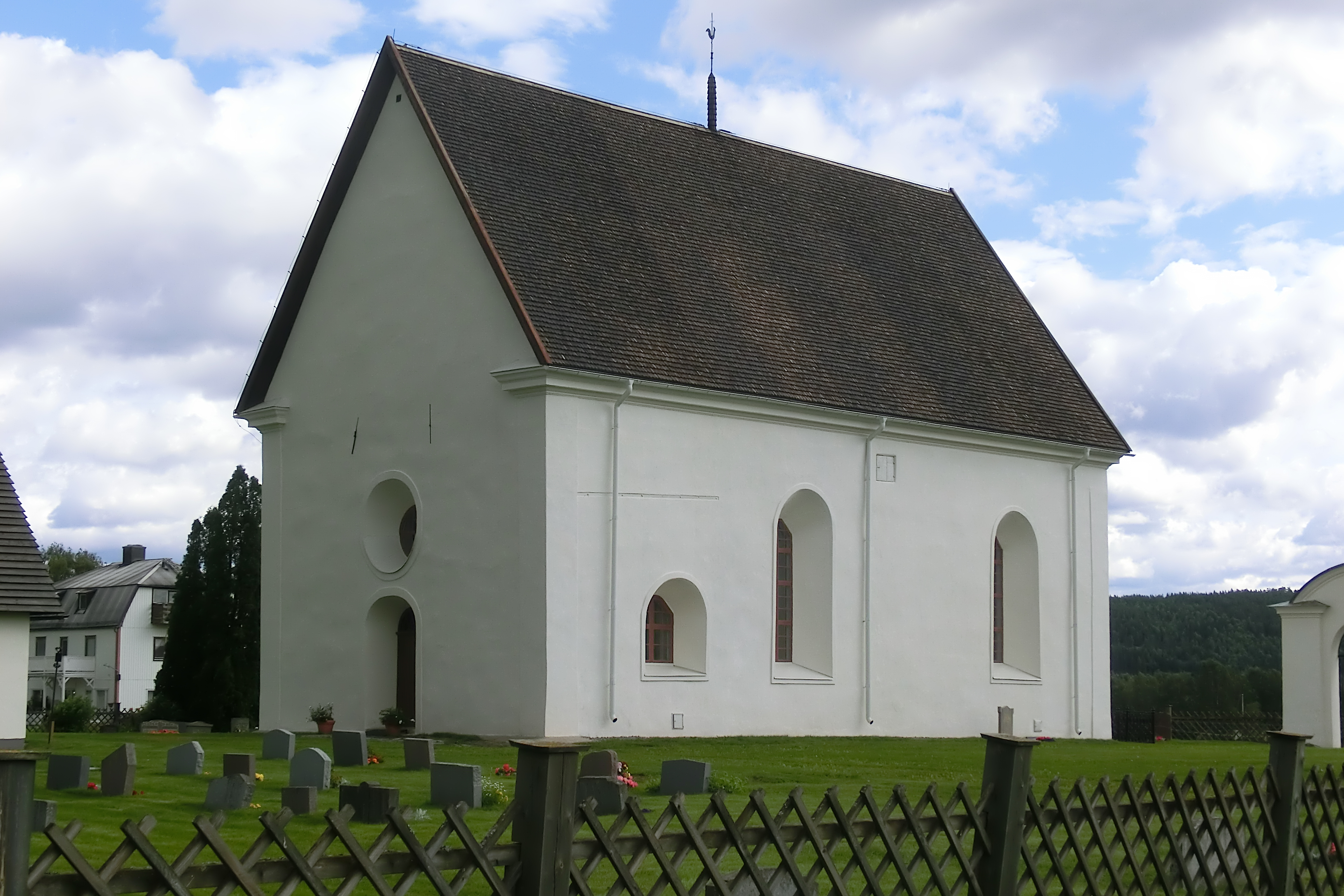
Torsåker Church

Torsåker parish (Swedish: Torsåkers församling) is in the Diocese of Härnösand in what is now Kramfors Municipality in Västernorrland County, Sweden.

Torsåker Church (Torsåkers kyrka) is a medieval church dating from ca. 1200. In its earliest stage, it had a Romanesque design. In the 15th century the choir was expanded and the church was extended to the west.

== History ==
The Torsåker witch trials took place in the parish during 1675. They began when Laurentius Christophori Hornæus of Ytterlännäs parish, was told by Johannes Wattrangius, of Torsåker parish, to investigate witchcraft in his parish. Ytterlännäs and Torsåker were both in the Diocese of Härnösand. Hornæus was zealous in his work, by time the witch hunt was complete, 71 people, 65 women, and six men, had been beheaded and burned. This was the largest witch hunt in Sweden. All the executions were held in a single day, making it one of the largest mass killings of accused witches in recorded history.

== Ministers ==
- 1. Dominus Suno [before 1341], he was minister in the 1330s and died before 1341. A letter to Archbishop Peter Filipson (1332–1341) from him is extant.
