= Sellaronda =

Ski resort in Northern Italy

Coordinates: 46.5093°N 11.7592°E

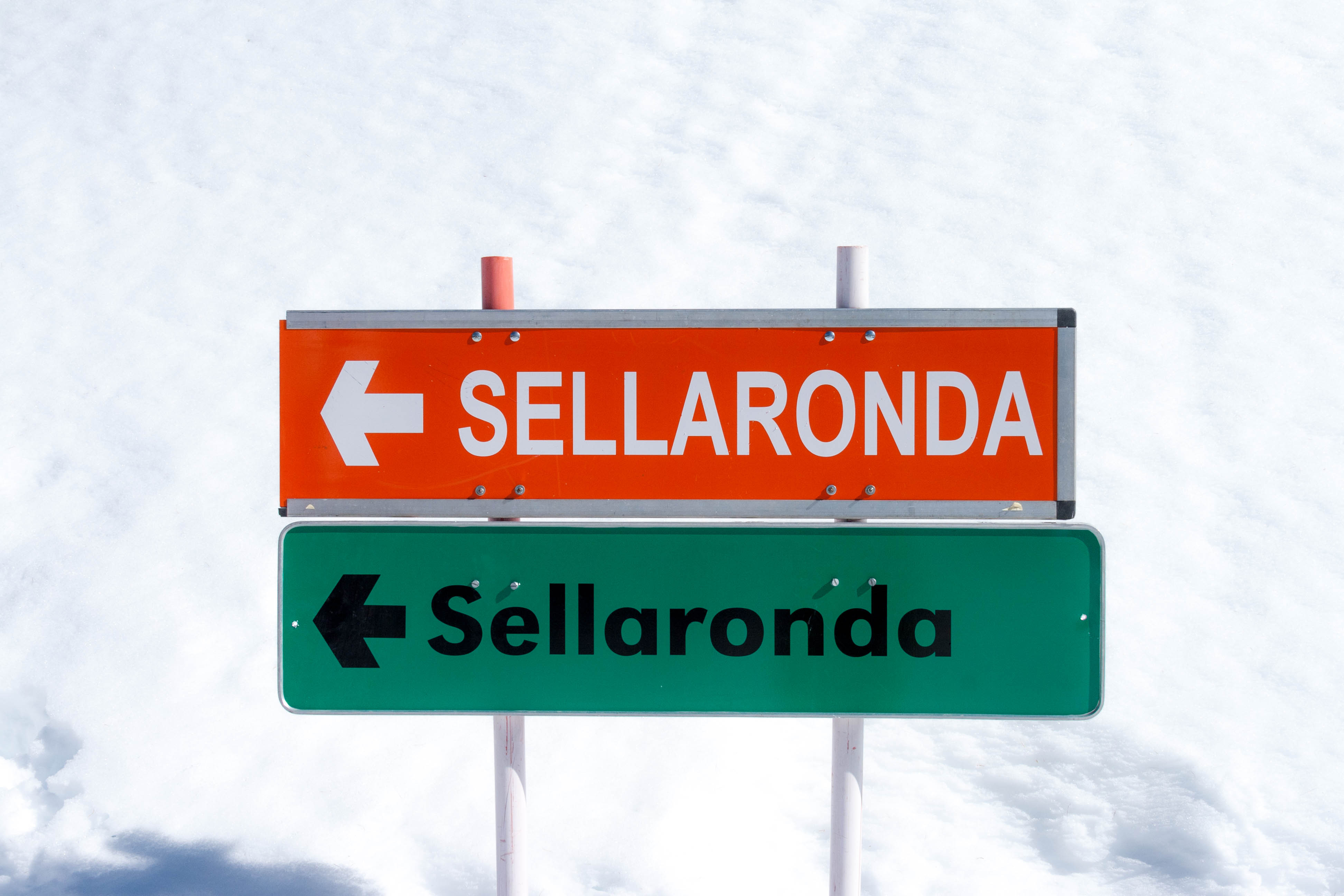

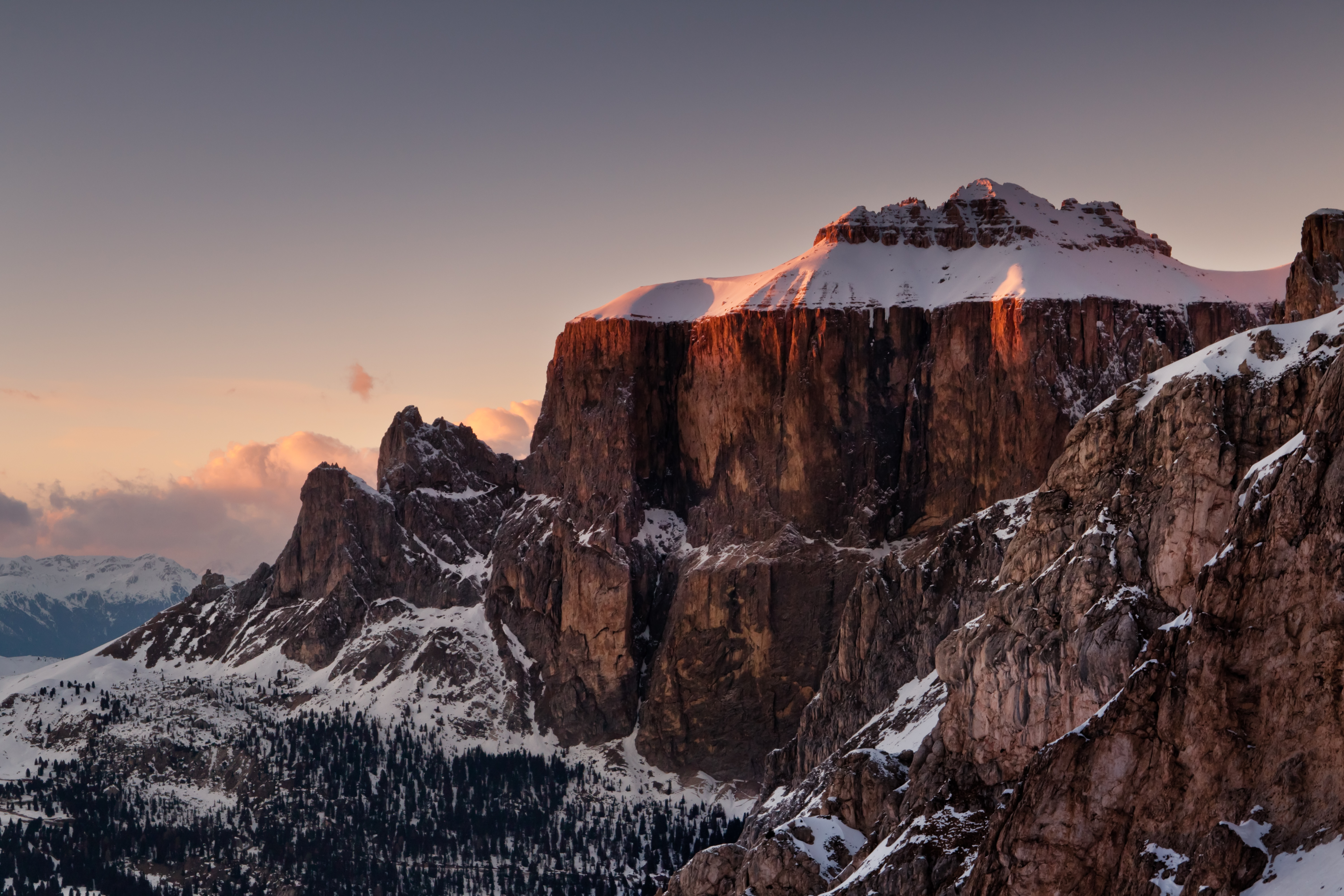
Sella group

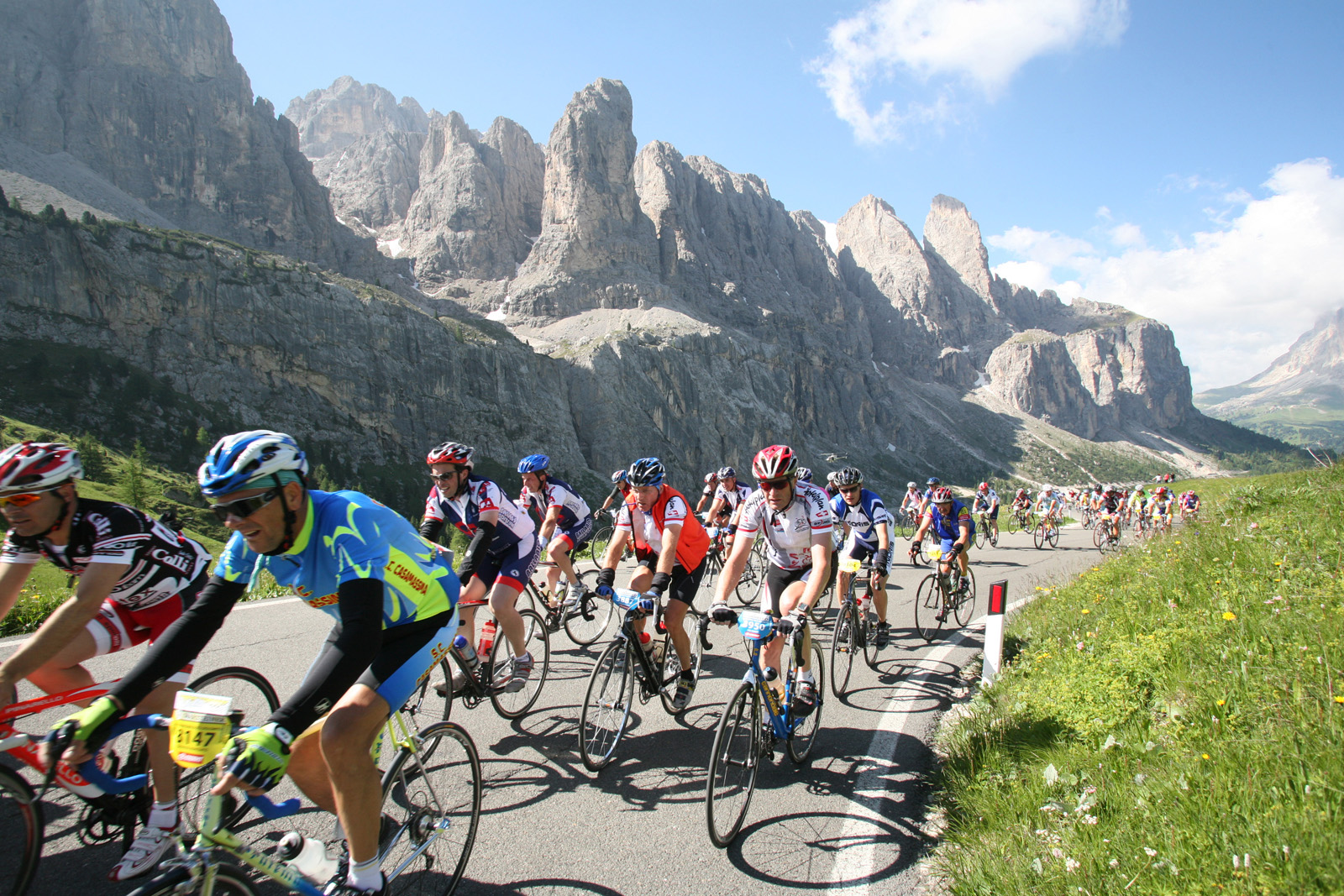
Maratona dles Dolomites

The Sellaronda is the ski circuit around the Sella group in the Dolomites mountains of Northern Italy.

The Sella massif lies between the four Ladin valleys of Badia, Val Gardena/Gröden, Fascia, and Fodom and is divided between the provinces of South Tyrol, Trentino and Belluno in the regions of Trentino-Alto Adige and Veneto. It can be driven around by motor vehicles crossing the Campolongo Pass, Pordoi Pass, Sella Pass, and Gardena Pass.

In winter it is possible to ski around the entire massif by using the Sellaronda ski lift carousel in a clockwise or counter-clockwise direction. Each winter the alpine touring ski Sellaronda Skimarathon race is held, which leads around the entire Sella and covers 42 km of mountain trails. Skiers are advised to set off before 10am to make sure they complete the circuit before the lifts close, as it can take up to six hours to complete depending on the weather and your ability. The Sella Ronda also gives access to more than 500 km of connected skiing with neighbouring resorts. The same trails can be ridden by mountain bike during the summer.
