= Maratona dles Dolomites =

Road bicycle race in Italy

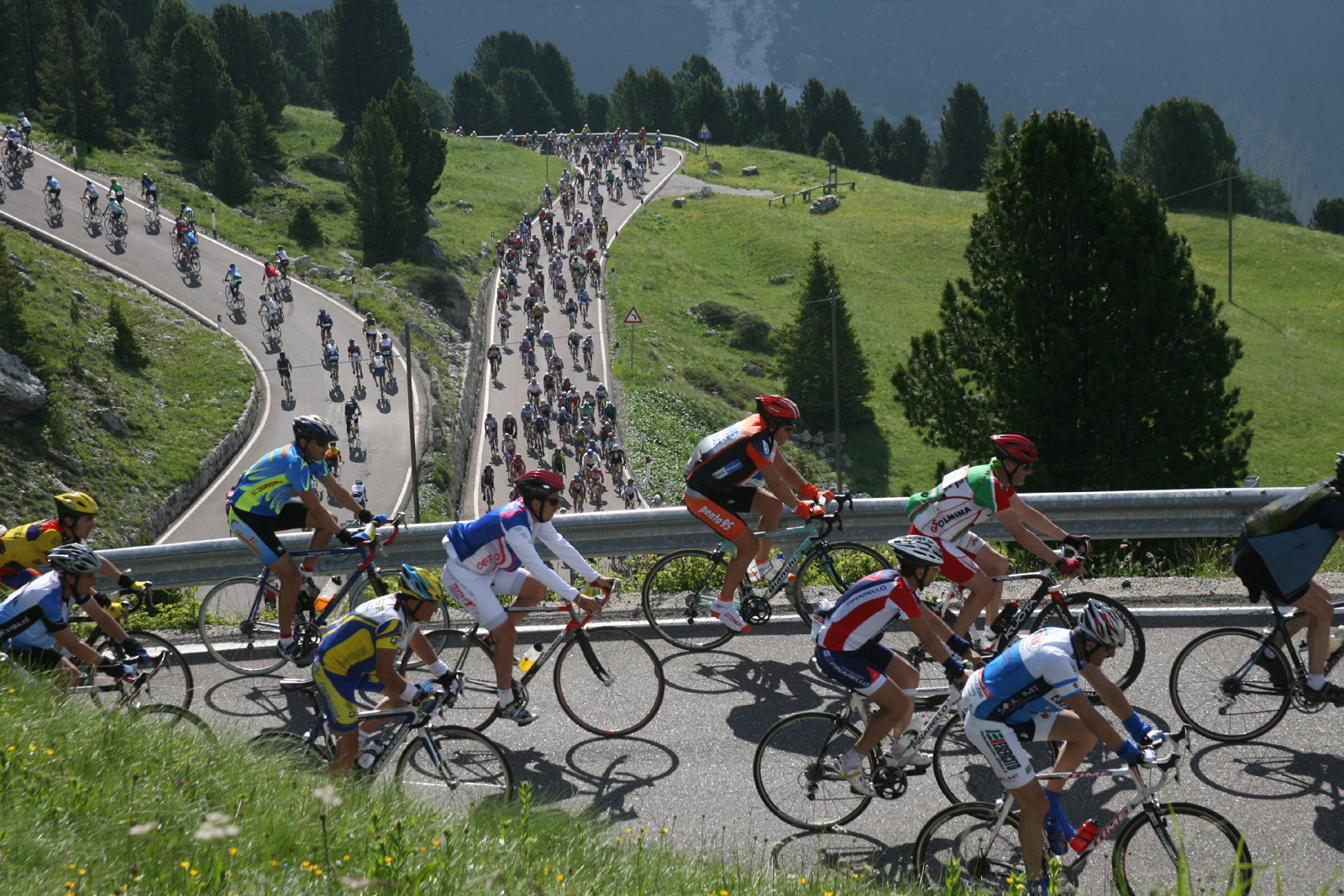

Race details
- Date: First week in July
- Region: Trentino-South Tyrol, Prov. Belluno Italy
- Nickname: Maratona dles Dolomites
- Discipline: Road
- Type: Granfondo: Single-day race
- Organiser: Maratona dles Dolomites Committee
- Race director: Michil Costa

History
- First edition: 12 July 1987
- Editions: 36 (as of 2023)
- First winner: Steinmair Wolfgang (M)

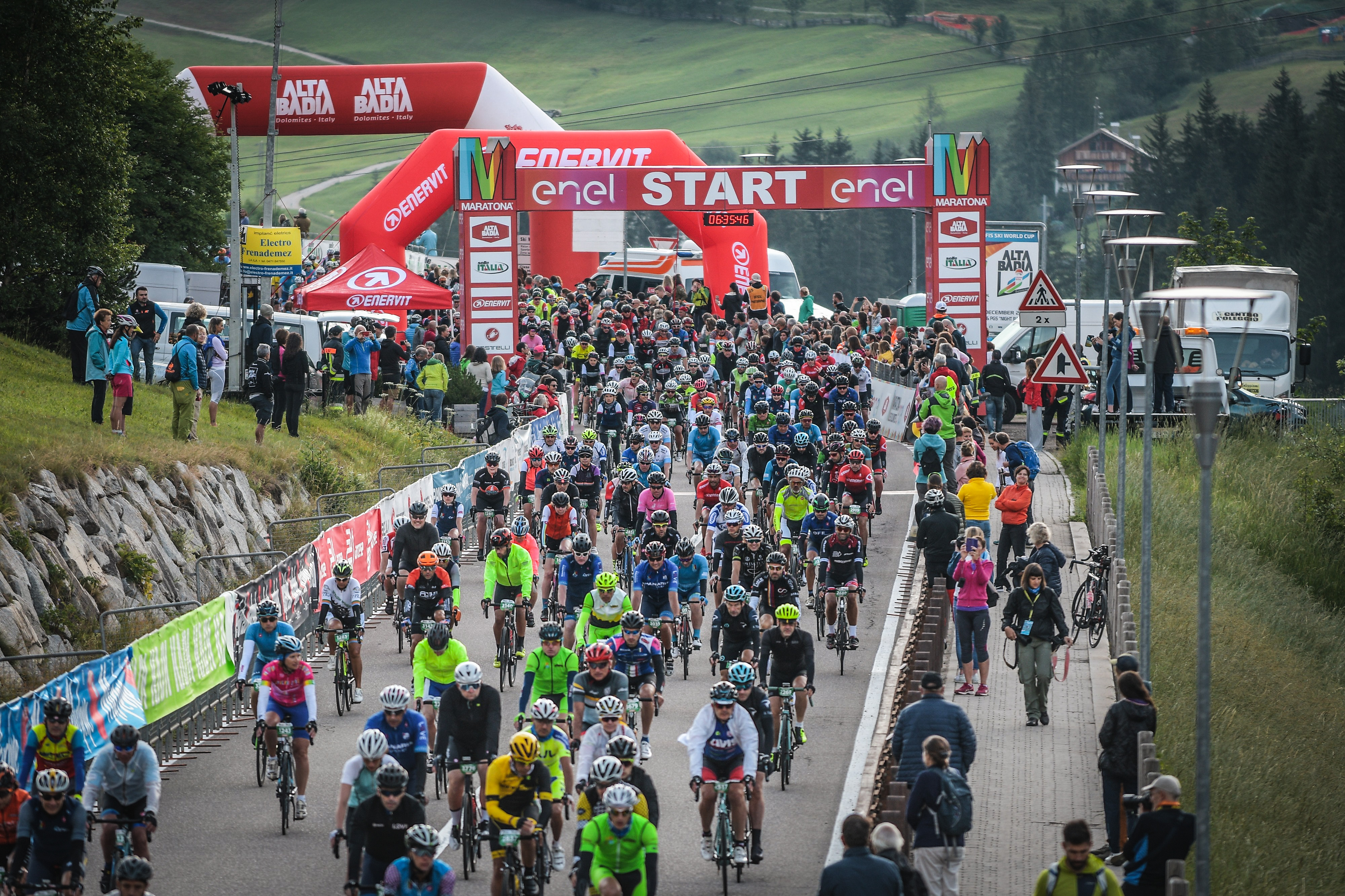
Start of the race in La Villa

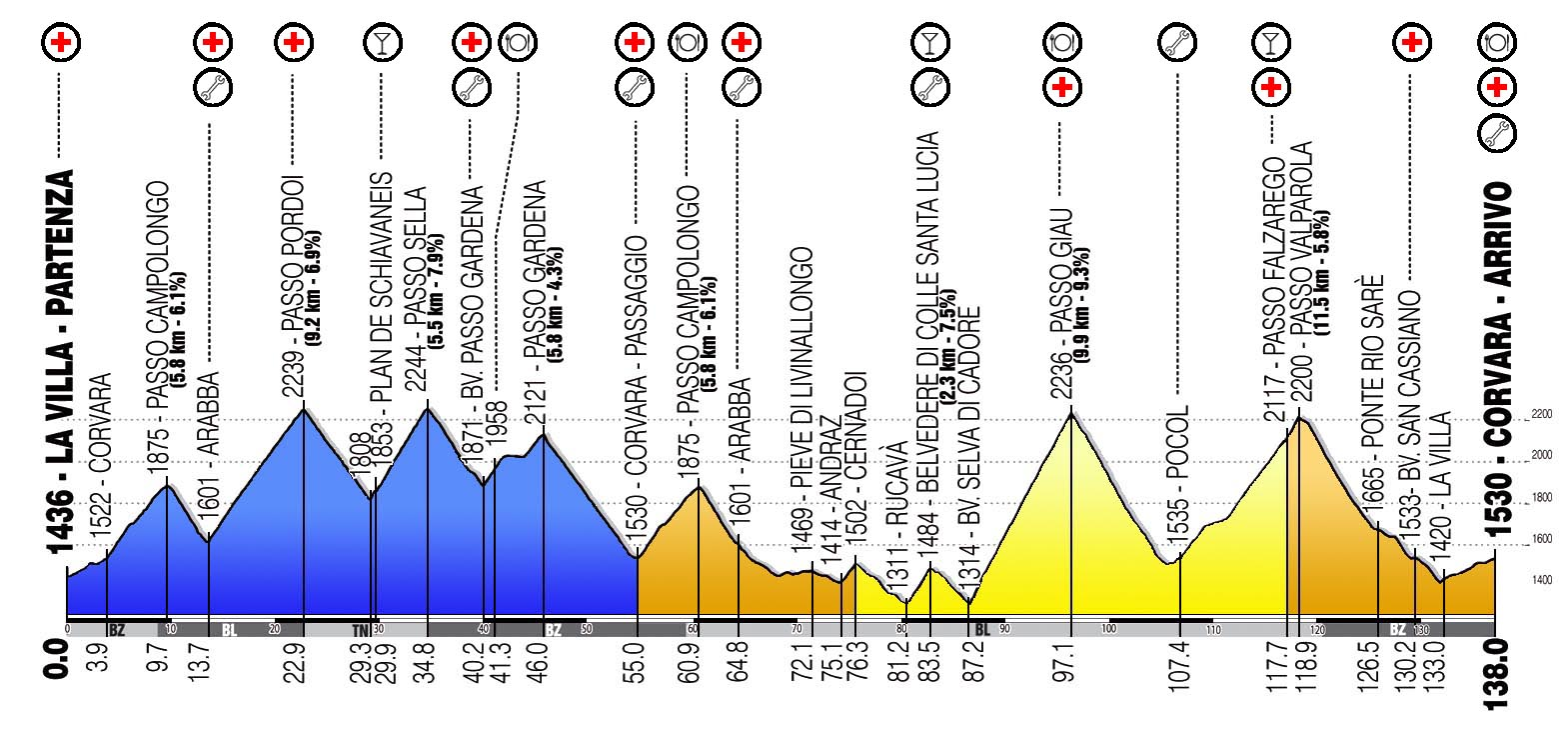
Altitude profile of the courses: Sellaronda in blue, the middle course in orange and the additional pass of the full Maratona in yellow

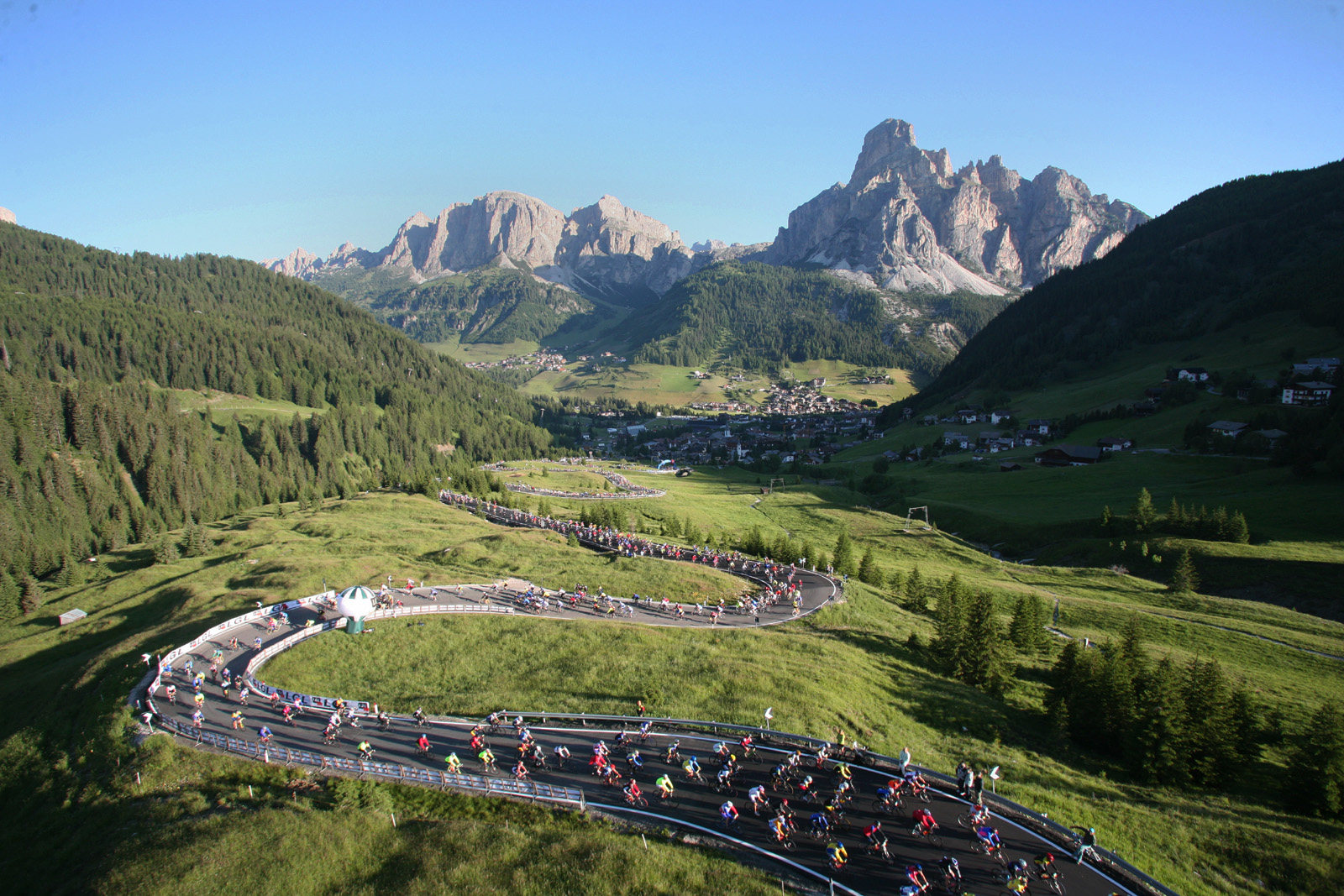
The first pass of the day

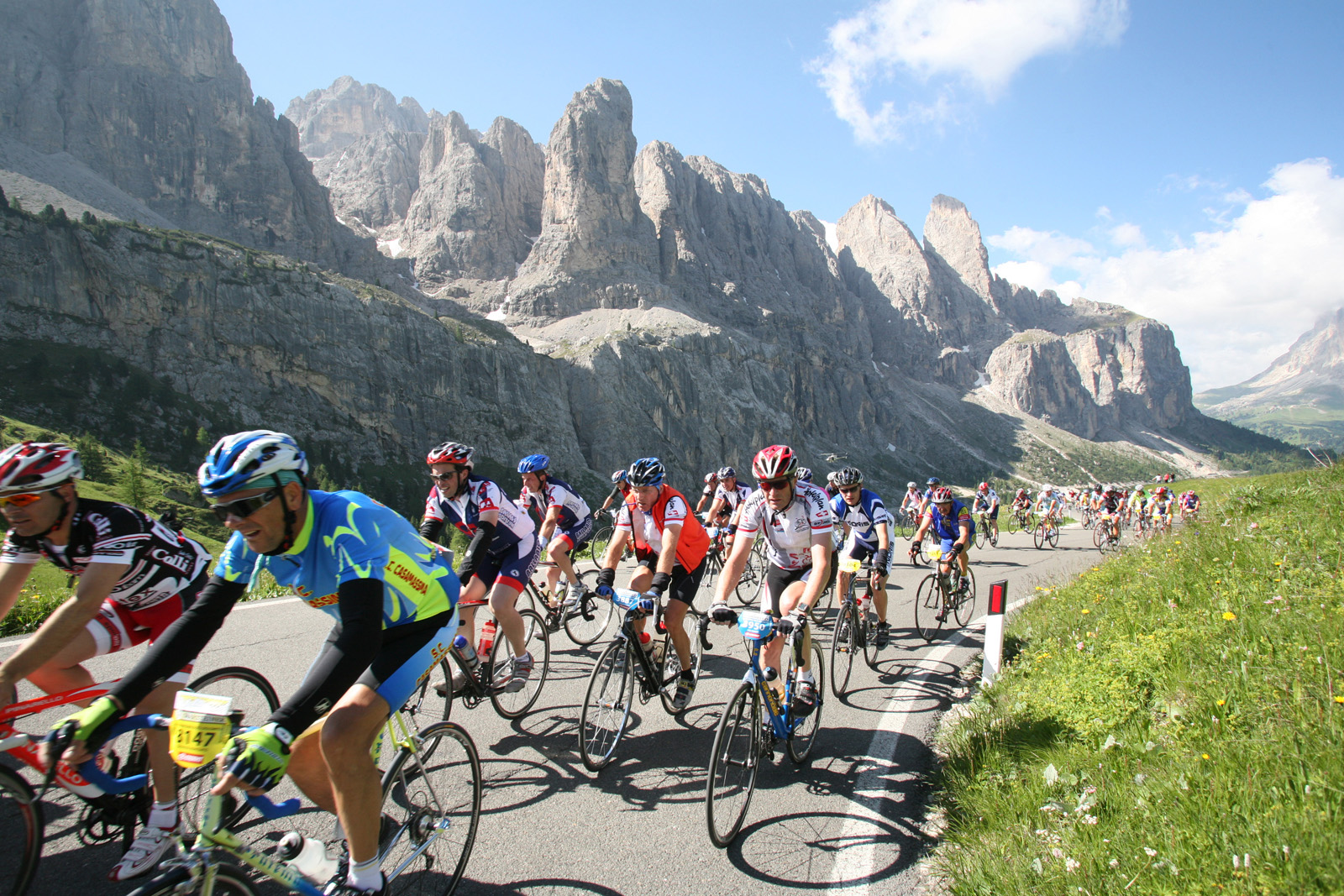
In the heart of the Dolomites

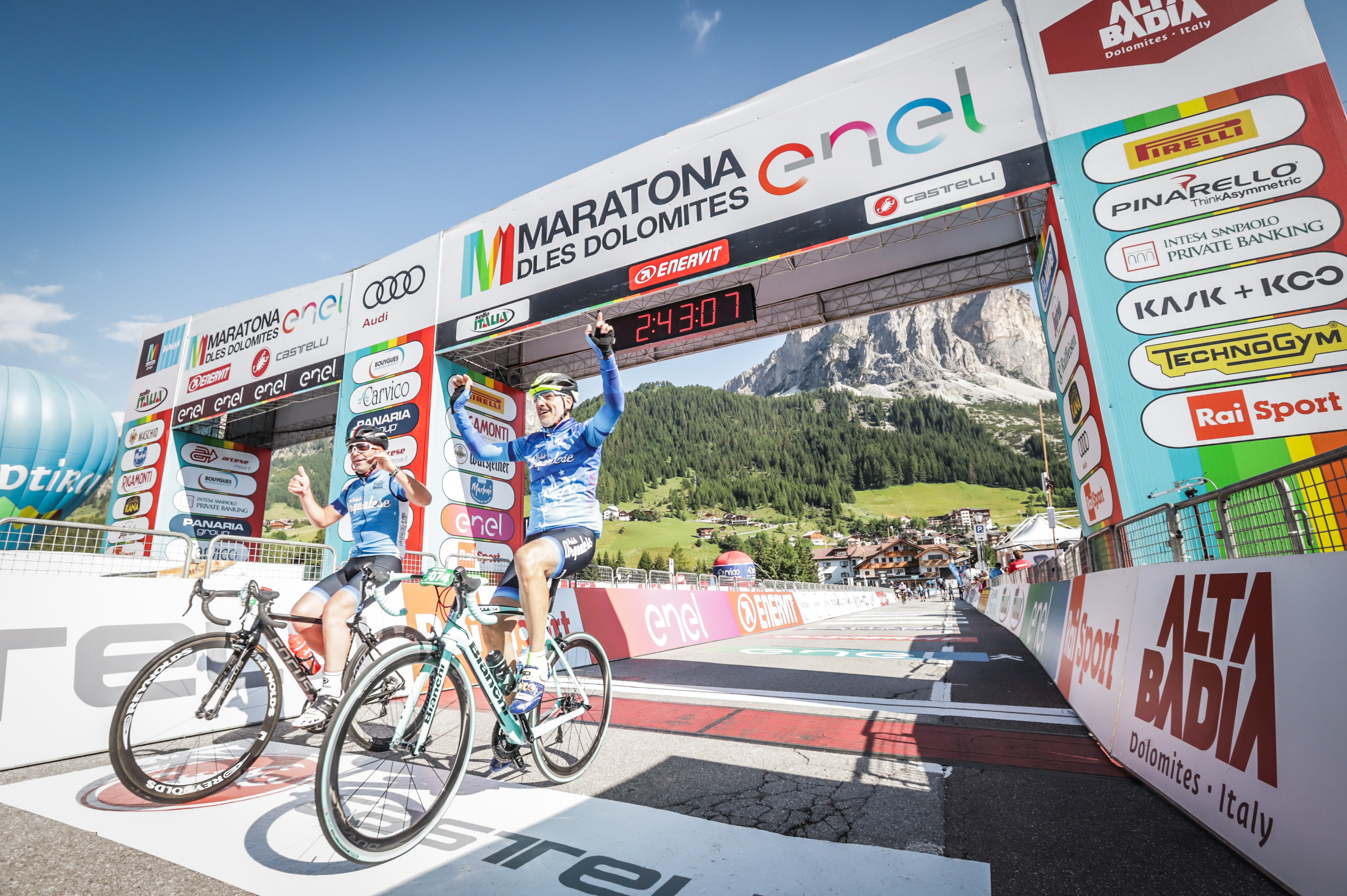
The Finish in Corvara

The Maratona dles Dolomites (Ladin for "Dolomites Marathon"; Italian: Maratona delle Dolomiti), is an annual single-day road bicycle race covering seven mountain passes in the Dolomites. Open to amateur cyclists, the Maratona—with 9,000 riders chosen from 30,000 applicants, from over 70 nations—is one of the biggest Italian Granfondo bicycle races. National Geographic described it as "one of the biggest, most passionate, and most chaotic bike races on Earth."

== History ==
=== 1987 - 1993 : The pioneers of Pedraces ===
1987

The first Maratona dles Dolomites was run on 12 July 1987. This was a celebration of the first ten years of the cycling club Societá Ciclistica Alta Badia-Raiffeisen. The route was unique and snaked through seven Dolomite passes: Gardena, Sella, Fedaia, Duran, Forcella Staulanza, Falzarego and Valparola over 175 kilometres (109 mi). It started and ended in Pedraces. There were 166 participants. The first to pass the finish line was the Austrian Wolfgang Steinmayr who rode for over ten hours. There was also a single woman: Trui Beemsterboern from Holland, who arrived one hour after the winner.

1988

There were two routes: the first was 184 kilometres (114 mi) long and mainly followed the roads of the first edition. The second was shorter. The cold, rainy day created quite a few problems for the 440 competitors. 417 people started the race. At the Duran Pass they stopped to decide what to do. The competition times were cancelled, but the race continued. The last competitor arrived at 21:00 hours, virtually frozen to death. A tub of boiling water awaited him in the hotel.

1989

It was also very cold the following year, which featured the Maratona pennant for the first time. The number of competitors continued to increase to 541. The starter was an exceptional professional, Flavio Giupponi, who had come second in the Giro d’Italia the year before. The day was so cold that the organisers decided to end the race at the Giau Pass.

1990

The route changed, and the Maratona was 184 kilometres (114 mi) long and included the Valparola Pass, descended to Cortina, the Tre Croci Pass, Misurina Lake, the Cimabanche watershed, Cortina, the Giau Pass, Colle Santa Lucia, Caprile, the Fedaia Pass, Canazei, the Pordoi Pass, Arabba and the Campolongo Pass. There were 5,000 metres (16,000 ft) of difference in altitude. There was also a shorter, more manageable route. There were 951 participants, including the first American. It was also the year of the first Maratona jersey that was given to all competitors.

1991

There were 1,292 participants of whom 32 were women and the Maratona finish line became electronic. The passages and times of competitors were recorded by a sign on the rear numbers and registered by IT systems. The weather was bad once again: it poured down from Lake Misurina to Cortina. The hail was painful. Then the sun returned to shine on the winner, Rainer Emerich of Dobbiaco on the short route and Pasquale Fiscato, from Veneto, on the long route.

1992

In the saddest year in the history of the Maratona, 2583 signed up but only 1897 took part. The cold was biting and it rained heavily. A serious road accident cost Luigi Nagler his life and injured Giovanni Fedrizzi.

1993

The Maratona's success continued to grow exponentially. With 3,095 participants including 138 women, for logistical reasons it was the last Maratona that left from Pedraces. It was the end of the pioneering era and a new modern era began for the most fascinating race in the world. This edition's route was 160 km long, without the Giau Pass.

=== 1994 - 1999 : The modern age ===
1994

There was such an increase in participants that the organisers decided to move the start of the race to Corvara. 5,031 people took part – almost 2,000 more than the previous year. There was a start time difference of over 16 minutes between the front of the group and the rear. It was a lovely day and the competitors felt the heat. 111 riders were caught without a helmet and were disqualified.

1995

The Maratona continued to grow as 6,674 people signed up - 1,500 more than the year before. There weren't enough numbers (6,500 had been ordered) or jerseys: the former were printed hurriedly on a computer, while the latter were posted to competitors’ homes. There were starting grids, with three groups of riders starting at different times.

1996

The Maratona dles Dolomites Committee was formed and substituted the Rodes Alta Badia, with the arduous task of organising and foreseeing the ‘future’ of what was becoming a special event as part of a gran fondo cycle race. 6,463 people signed up. There was bad weather; it rained and was cold on the Sella.

1997

The first decision of the Maratona dles Dolomites Committee was to combine the race, on 28 September the same year, with the first edition of The Terrific Alta Badia Race, named after local champion Maria Canins. A brochure was printed for the first time and the week before the competition was filled with many events – not only linked to cycling.

1998

The growing success of the Maratona led the new committee to think of limiting numbers, although the competition retained the same format.

1999

The introduction of the Datasport precision timing system, with Datachips that took readings in real time from start to finish. The formula of a cyclists’ week gained even more ground, thanks to sports and entertainment events, as well as collateral events to the Maratona, including the Tenerific Maria Canins, a cycle race for children aged 4 to 12.

=== 2000 - 2005 : The Maratona begins to speak ===
2000

Some new features included that each edition would have a motto, a key word, theme or special dedication. It began with ‘Living is an Art’. The start was moved to La Villa and the Fedaia Pass was no longer part of the route. The committee established a fixed number of 6,000 participants. Over thirty nationalities took part. However, the edition was marked by a terrible accident: a competitor died while coming down the Giau Pass.

2001

The theme was ‘Magic Lives in Us‘. The fixed number of participants was raised to 7,000.

2002

The edition was dedicated to women and was broadcast live for the first time on RAI3. It was an unexpected success: millions of people discovered the wonders of the route wedged between the Dolomites. All future editions of the Maratona dles Dolomites would be broadcast live on T.V.

2003

The Maratona was dedicated to the disabled and was twinned with the New York Marathon. Organisers introduced anti-doping tests.

2004

The family was the focus of the edition. All three routes were closed to traffic for the first time. The maximum number of participants was increased to 8,000 and registration ended in one week.

2005

The edition of the Maratona was dedicated to ‘angels’. There was also another new feature: given the growing number of participants and requests to take part, the committee introduced a draw system, so participants could only take part if their name was drawn.

=== 2006 - 2010 : The modern age ===
2006

The edition took place over three routes that would now become the usual ones. The Maratona was dedicated to ‘colours’ and had a special guest: Jetsum Pema, the sister of the Dalai Lama, representing the Tibetan Children's Village Association. The maximum number of participants was increased to 8,500 competitors, but requests to take part were almost double that.

2007

‘Gotes’- ‘drops’, was the theme. There were 8,500 participants from 39 countries. As in previous years there were famous names from the sports and business world at the starting line. The children's cycle race changed its name and became the "Maratona for Kids", still organised by Maria Canins.

2008

The success of the Maratona continued, known as ‘Fostüs’, ‘traces’. The race was broadcast live from the start and for the first time there was a YouTube film contest dedicated to the Maratona.

2009

Energy was the theme. A shuttle service was set up to avoid polluting roads in Alta Badia. The number of requests to take part increased continually, but the maximum number remained fixed. There was a surprise at the finish line: one of the first competitors to arrive was disqualified because he was caught throwing waste away during the race.

2010

The ecological focus of the Maratona is increasingly central and evident, and edition was entitled ‘Eco?Logical!’. The event boasted 70% carbon neutral certification. The idea was to gain international recognition for the event that managed to reduce all kinds of pollution. Closing the race routes to cars made an important contribution to this.

=== 2011 - 2022 : An aware Maratona ===
2011

‘Giulan’ – ‘thanks’ was the title of the edition, now in its 25th year. 9,131 days had passed since 1987 when the first Maratona was staged with 166 cyclists over 177 kilometres (110 mi). Some of these, like Giorgio Apolloni with bib no. 1 and Roberto Della Noce, no. 2, still race today with the same enthusiasm as in the past. Olympic champions, Italian and international managers and famous people, also ride the race. ENEL became a title sponsor of the event.

2012

The year of the ‘Smile’, 8,703 cyclists competed, 746 of whom were women. There were many well-known figures and it was a marvellous day. New features in 2012 included: official jerseys no longer wrapped individually in plastic packages (eliminating a ton of useless waste – around 2,000 metres (6,600 ft) of plastic), the eco-pocket on the side of the jersey, the use of completely recyclable propylene cups and plates at the finish line refreshment point and a 60% reduction in paper inside the race packs, thanks to the help of partners and sponsors. Numbered slips were also given out to all riders at the finish line who, once they had received a drink, gave the plastic bottle back for collection in a recycling bin. Among the slips given out, some were chosen for free registration in the next Maratona dles Dolomites. There was once again a free shuttle bus to take cyclists to the expo and bib distribution area. Finally, the cleaning staff saw a 50% reduction in waste on the Maratona roads. The event's "Carbon Neutrality" index in 2012 was 80%.

2013

Cold, snow, sun and dedication followed in perfect ‘Harmony’ - the theme of the edition. There were 9,143 cyclists of the 9,339 selected by lottery, from 52 countries. The race started at 6:30 am with an air temperature of 5 °C (41 °F). Michil Costa, the event organiser, described the day after six hours of live TV broadcasting as "…an important page in a book of wonders, the ideal combination of nature, culture and plenty of heart".

2014

‘Time’ was the main theme. 8,969 riders left La Villa in a 36-minute long train, the time it took the cyclists to enter the competition to the rhythm of live music and encouragement. There were large numbers and a huge demand for participation (32,600 people), with the usual formula: a fixed number of participants, car-free Dolomite passes, charity initiatives and eco-sustainability, with the use of electric cars and motorbikes to transport the jury and the race organisers. The "mür dl giat" was the great new feature. All cyclists on the medium and long route, during the second passage through La Villa, were asked to face a final tough challenge: 200 metres (660 ft) after the turn for Corvara, then had to climb the "mür dl giat" (the cat's wall), as the inhabitants of La Villa are known as ‘cats’. This was a deviation with a 19% grade that crossed La Villa. At the top it re-joined the main route to the finish line in Corvara.

2015

9,302 athletes from 64 countries participated in the 2015 event. The theme of the race ‘Forgiveness’, demonstrated that it was a far-ranging event with features beyond cycling.

2016

8,903 cyclists started participated in the 2016 event. Half the cyclists were Italian, the other half are a heterogeneous group from five different continents: Germany, Great Britain, the Netherlands and Belgium represented Europe; Qatar, Japan, Korea, Colombia and Kazakhstan, are only some of the nationalities of the cyclists travelling from afar. The theme chosen was ‘the journey’.

2017

The theme chosen was LOVE. 9,129 cyclists (962 women) from 69 countries started at 6:30 am from La Villa. That's a high numbers’ mechanism with more than 33,500 pre-registrations but a limited numbers race; the Dolomite passes closed for all the race long; charity's objective and eco-sustainable way to live the race with electrical cars and motorbikes for internal use. Among the participants was Sir Bradley Wiggins who completed the race for the first time and stated, "I really enjoyed it although it was very tough". The route comprised twists and turns through the seven Dolomite passes: Pordoi, Sella, Campolongo, Falzarego, Gardena, Valparola, Giau, starting from La Villa and finishing to Corvara. Three levels of competition were available: the long route of 138 kilometres (86 mi) and 4,230 metres (13,880 ft) of altitude; the medium route of 106 kilometres (66 mi) and 3,130 metres (10,270 ft) of altitude; and Sella Ronda of 55 kilometres (34 mi) and 1,780 metres (5,840 ft) of altitude.

2018

The theme chosen was EQUILIBRIUM. 9,239 cyclists (including 978 women) participated in the event. The traditional starting pistol was fired by Eddy Merckx. There are always many flags flying at the queen of the international granfondo sportives: 68 different countries (from the five continents) were represented. In 2018 4,900 cyclists participated for the first time. And their total number was equally subdivided between Italians (50%) and foreigners (50%). There were three courses over the passes, closed to traffic, that made history in cycling: Pordoi, Sella, Campolongo, Falzarego, Gardena, Valparola, Giau, all of them strictly closed to traffic. The distances and altitudes were the same as the 2017 race. For the second year in a row, the male winner was Tommaso Elettrico from Matera in 4h38’13" followed by Igor Zanetti and Paolo Castelnovo, both after 50". The female winner was Christina Rausch from Germany.

2019

The theme chosen was DUMAN, TOMORROW. 9,038 cyclists, including 926 women, from 69 countries participated. For more than half an hour, racers paraded on the road from La Villa to Corvara and then they tackled the first difficulty of the race, i.e. the Campolongo. It was a colourful procession that painted the hairpin turns and that then grew thinner and thinner as the road climbed to the mountain pass. These emotions were described live on TV, on the RAI 2 channel, that followed the entire race in a six-hour long sequence of images. Participants came from 72 different countries and five continents and were equally subdivided between Italians (50%) and foreigners (50%). The theme highlighted the charity initiatives that have been characteristic of the Maratona dles Dolomites-Enel. Tomorrow is closely linked to today, as evidenced by the initiatives of solidarity in favour of the Colle Santa Lucia and Livinallongo municipalities, through which the Maratona cyclists have raced for years. On 29 October 2018 a storm caused huge damage and destroyed millions of trees, roads and paths. For this reason, the Committee of the Maratona dles Dolomites - Enel organized a fund-raising initiative for the two Municipalities using special entries to the race. Many Italian celebrities cycled this year including: Martina Colombari, Nicola Savino, Paolo Bettini, Davide Cassani, Robert Kubica, Alex Zanardi, Carlos Checa, Filippo Pozzato, Dorothea Wierer, Lisa Vittozzi, Sofia Goggia, Kristian Ghedina, Vittorio Brumotti, Federico Pellegrino, Maria Canins and others. For the third year in a row, the male winner was the Italian Tommaso Elettrico in 4h36’20" followed by Fabio Cini and Vincenzo Pisani, both after 4'. The female winner was again Christina Rausch from Germany, followed by Martha Maltha and Simona Parente.

2020

Due to the COVID-19 pandemic, the organizing committee decided to cancel the event and return in 2021. However, the organizers launched the MyMdD initiative, which allowed cyclists to ride the Maratona individually through the summer and autumn. Each cyclist received a customized finisher cap as a gift.

2021

It was supposed to be a rainy, cold, and gloomy day but at 6.30 a.m. a pale sun, which gradually became brighter and brighter, welcomed the 5.615 cyclists ready to start the 34th edition of Maratona dles Dolomites-Enel, this year dedicated to Art. A smaller number than usual, due to the pandemic. Fabio Cini and Marta Maltha won the long course of 138 kilometres and over 4,000m altitude gain in the Ladin Dolomites.

2022

Almost seven thousand cyclists participated in the 35th edition of the Maratona dles Dolomites – Enel. This edition was dedicated to "Ciüf" – Flora. The Maratona is an event that for years has been committed to combining sport and care for the environment. One of the objectives for the 2022 race was to drastically reduce the use of plastic at the final refreshment area. Thanks to a major investment, 16,000 glass-ceramic plates and reusable crockery were purchased, thus reducing the use of plastic by 70 percent. Stefano Stagni and Marta Maltha were the winners of the long race. Stefano Stagni was accused of cheating in the race and using a motorized bike, however, it was not proven.

2023

Inspired by the theme Umanité (humanity), the 36th edition of the Maratona dles Dolomites-Enel offered a spectacle on the Dolomite passes, which were closed to traffic for one day. Loïc Ruffaut and Samantha Arnaudo won the longest stage, 138 kilometres long and over 4.000 metres in altitude. But the race confirmed an aspect that has always characterised it: it is in the community that one can find the great humanity that the whole world needs.

2024

The sky was cloudy when the 8.050 cyclists started the 37th edition of the Maratona dles Dolomites - Enel, dedicated to Mutatio, the constant metamorphosis that characterises today's world. Even the weather was changeful, with rain at times, but this did not spoil the festive atmosphere, in fact it made the day even more epic. The winners of the 138 km course were Giuseppe Orlando in the men's race and Laura Simenc in the women's race.

== The race ==
The race is divided into three courses of varying difficulty: the Sellaronda course, the Middle course and the Maratona course. All riders start at 6:30 am in the village of La Ila and complete the four pass Sellaronda course first. After completing the Sellaronda course riders can either choose to finish the race or proceed directly onwards with the Middle course. As the Maratona course is an extension of the preceding shorter Middle course, riders doing the full Maratona dles Dolomites have to proceed with the Middle course. All three courses go through the Dolomite mountains around the Sella Group and over roads on which the Giro d'Italia has taken place. The roads are lined with thousands of spectators and the event is broadcast live on Italian national broadcaster RAI. Multiple refreshment stations along the course are staffed by volunteers offering foods and drinks, varying from sports drink to coffee to Strudel or Speck sandwiches.

== Riders' Week ==
The week prior to the Maratona is an event called "Riders' Week". Group rides, training rides, cycling events, and parties are organized and held daily. Many racers therefore spend the entire week preceding the Maratona in the Val Badia.

== The courses ==
(see also: external map of the courses)

=== Overview ===
Pass name	Distance		Gradient	Courses			Notes
Pass name	km	mi	Gradient	Maratona	Middle	Sellaronda	Notes
Campolongo	5.8	3.6	6.1%	Yes	Yes	Yes	
Pordoi	9.2	5.7	6.9%	Yes	Yes	Yes	
Sella	5.5	3.4	7.9%	Yes	Yes	Yes	
Gardena	5.8	3.6	4.3%	Yes	Yes	Yes	
Campolongo (2)	5.8	3.6	6.1%	Yes	Yes	No	
Giau	9.9	6.2	9.3%	Yes	No	No	
Falzarego / Valparola	11.5	7.1	5.8%	Yes	Yes	No	

=== Sellaronda course ===
The Sellaronda course starts in the village of La Ila and finishes in the village of Corvara. The course goes clockwise around the Sella mountain group. Four passes must be surmounted to finish the course. After the start the course follows the main road through the Val Badia to the village of Corvara. The ascent to Campolongo Pass begins immediately behind the village. After crossing Campolongo Pass the course descends to the village of Arabba in the Fodom valley; from there it climbs to the Pordoi Pass and then descends into the Fassa valley. There the climb to the Sella Pass begins, from which the riders descend into Gardena valley. The last pass the Sellaronda course traverses is the Gardena Pass. From it the course begins its final descent towards the finish at Corvara.

- Total distance: 55 km (34 mi)
- Total altitude difference: 1,780 m (5,840 ft)

=== Middle course ===
The Middle course follows immediately after the Sellaronda course. Riders wishing to tackle it, do not stop after the Sellaronda's finish line, but directly proceed to ascend Campolongo Pass a second time. In Arabba the middle course deviates from the earlier course and follows the road out of the Fodom valley to the village of Cernadoi. Here the course splits: rider choosing to do the entire Maratona proceed to the village of Colle Santa Lucia, while the remaining riders begin the ascend to the Falzarego Pass. At the top of the pass riders climb further 80m to reach the Valparola Pass. From there the road descends to the village of San Ćiascian and passing through La Ila reaches the finishing line in Corvara.

- Total distance: 106 km (66 mi)
- Total altitude difference: 3,130 m (10,270 ft)

=== Maratona course ===
Riders who have chosen to do the Maratona course split off from the Middle course in the village of Cernadoi. The Maratona dles Dolomites proceeds from there to the village and uncategorised climb of the Colle Santa Lucia, after which the steepest of all climbs begins: the climb to Giau Pass. From Giau Pass the road goes down to Pocol, from where the course rises to the Falzarego Pass. There it reunites with the Middle course and having crossed Valparola Pass follows the same road through San Ćiascian and La Ila to the finish line in Corvara.

- Total distance: 138 km (86 mi)
- Total altitude difference: 4,230 m (13,880 ft)

== Recent results ==
Year	Distance		Participants	Winners						Notes
Year	km	mi	Participants	Male	Nationality	Time	Female	Nationality	Time	Notes
1987	175	109	166	Steinmair Wolfgang	AUT	10:15	Trui Beemsterboern	NLD		
1988	184	114	440	without time measurement						
1989	184	114	541	race stopped at Passo Giau due to bad weather						
1990	184	114	951	Anderlini Giuliano	ITA	7:19				
1991	184	114	1,292	Fiscato Pasquale	ITA	7:02				
1992	194	121	2,583	Esser Peter	GER	6:14				
1993	185	115	3,095	Anderlini Giuliano	ITA	6:51				
1994	185	115	5,031	Anderlini Giuliano	ITA	6:25				
1995	185	115	6,674	Bertozzi Daniele	ITA	6:10				
1996	185	115	6,463	Bertozzi Daniele	ITA	6:22				
1997	185	115	5,808	Paganessi Alessandro	ITA	6:02				
1998	174	108	6,097	Paganessi Alessandro	ITA	5:43				
1999	174	108	6,394	Moretti Roberto	ITA	5:28				
2000	147	91	7,058	Bruseghin Marzio	ITA	4:38				
2001	147	91	7,000	Puglioli Mirko	ITA	4:38				
2002	147	91	7,565	Bachini Maurizio	ITA	4:32				
2003	147	91	8,119	Negrini Emanuele	ITA	4:38				
2004	147	91	8,338	Negrini Emanuele	ITA	4:31				
2005	147	91	8,820	Negrini Emanuele	ITA	4:28				
2006	138	86	8,864	Negrini Emanuele	ITA	4:23				
2007	138	86	8,993	Jones Timothy	ZIM	4:32				
2008	138	86	9,409	Negrini Emanuele	ITA	4:29				
2009	138	86	9,171	Burrow Jamie	GBR	4:37				
2010	138	86	9,066	Kairelis Dainius	LTU	4:35				
2011	138	86	9,121	Sorrenti Mazzocchi Giuseppe	ITA	4:33				
2012	138	86	8,705	Burrow Jamie	GBR	4:38				
2013	138	86	9,143	Snel Michel	NLD	4:43				
2014	138	86	8,969	Cecchini Stefano	ITA	4:44				
2015	138	86	9,302	Salimbene Luigi	ITA	4:44				
2016	138	86	9,302	Nardecchia Cristian	ITA	4:40	Lancioni Barbara	ITA	5:14	
2017	138	86	9,305	Elettrico Tommaso	ITA	4:37	Magnaldi Erica	ITA	5:16	
2018	138	86	9,382	Elettrico Tommaso	ITA	4:38	Rausch Christina	GER	5:19	
2019	138	86	9,192	Elettrico Tommaso	ITA	4:36	Rausch Christina	GER	5:22	
2020	Event cancelled due to COVID-19 pandemic									
2021	138	86	5,818	Fabio Cini	ITA	4:31	Martha Maltha	NED	5:17	
2022	138	86	8,036	Stagni Stefano	ITA	4:27	Maltha Martha	NED	5:12	
