= Badia, South Tyrol =

Badia
- Comune
- Comun de Badia; Comune di Badia; Gemeinde Abtei
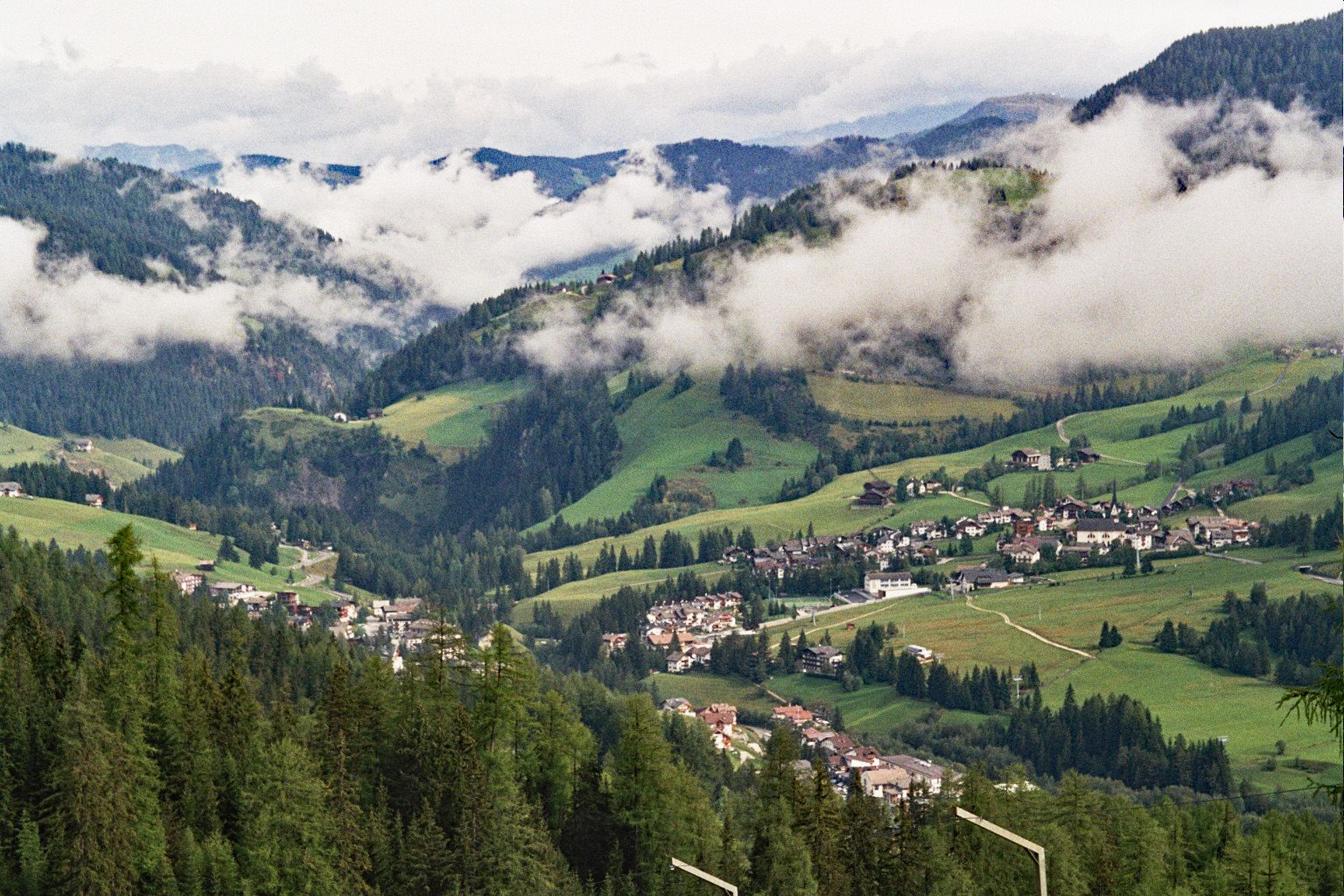
- View of Badia (Abtei)

- Coat of arms

- Location within Italy Location within Trentino-Alto Adige/Südtirol
- Coordinates: 46°35′N 11°54′E
- Country: Italy
- Region: Trentino-Alto Adige/Südtirol
- Province: South Tyrol (BZ)
- Frazioni: La Ila (La Villa, Stern), San Ciascian (San Cassiano, Sankt Kassian)

Government
  - Mayor: Christian Pedevilla

Area
  - Total: 82 km^{2} (32 sq mi)
- Elevation: 1,315 m (4,314 ft)

Population (Nov. 2010)
  - Total: 3,356
  - Density: 41/km^{2} (110/sq mi)
- Demonyms: Badioć, Badiotti, Abteier
- Time zone: UTC+1 (CET)
  - Summer (DST): UTC+2 (CEST)
- Postal code: 39036
- Dialing code: 0471
- Patron saint: Saint Leonard
- Website: Official website

Badia (Italian pronunciation: [baˈdiːa]; German: Abtei [abˈtaɪ̯]) is a comune (municipality) in South Tyrol, northern Italy. It is one of the five Ladin-speaking communities of the Val Badia which is part of the Ladinia region.

== Geography ==
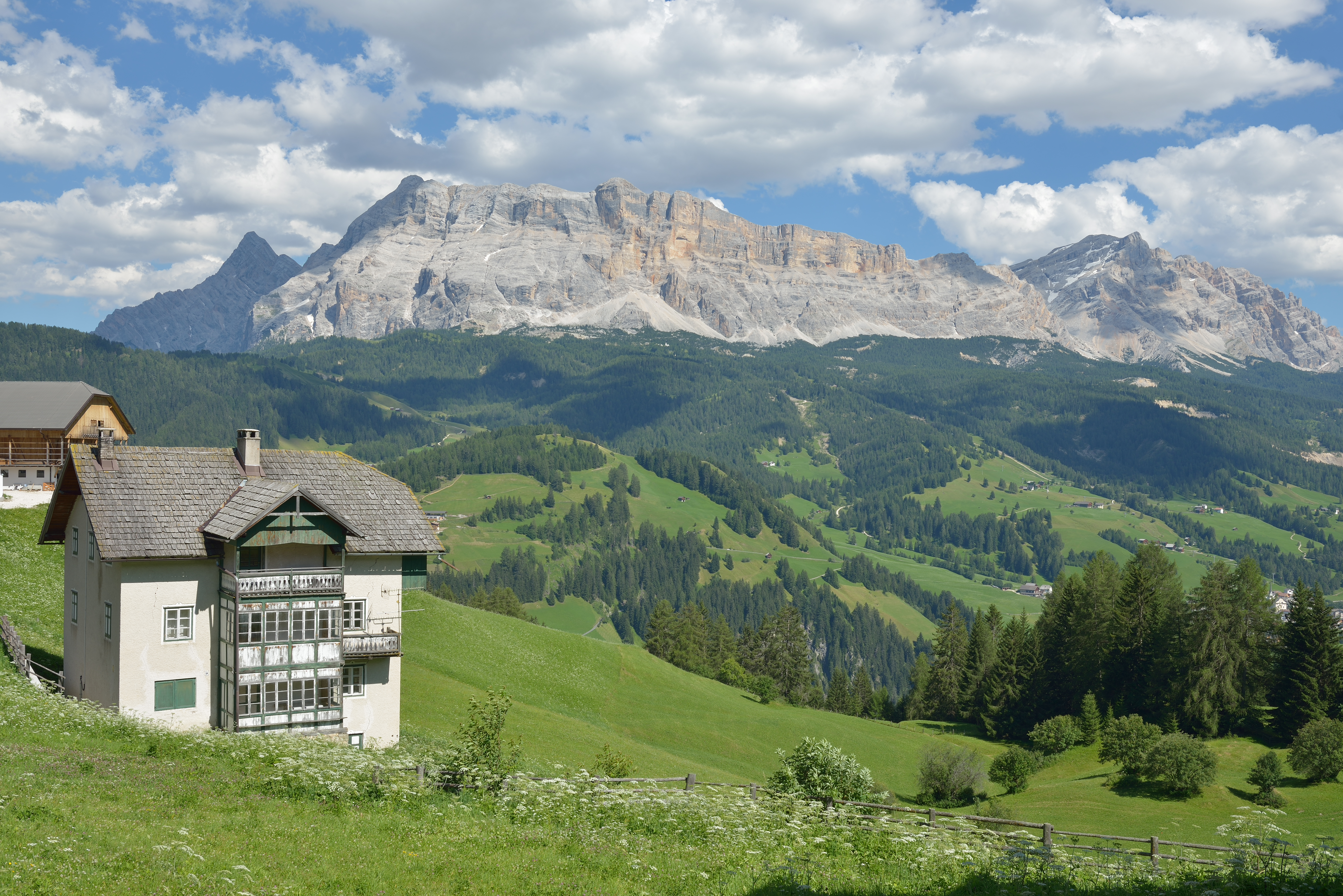
View to Sas dla Crusc massif

The municipal area stretches on the Gran Ega river in the southern, upper part of the Val Badia (Abteital). It is surrounded by the steep limestone peaks of the scenic Dolomites mountain range. Part of the comune lies in Alta Badia, a ski resort at the top end of the Val Badia valley.

Badia is accessible by road from La Val (Wengen) in the north, located about half-way down to the Puster Valley at Bruneck. In the south, the valley road leads up to three mountain passes: Valparola Pass, connecting Badia with Cortina d’Ampezzo, Campolongo Pass linking the neighbouring comune of Corvara with the Arabba ski resort, and Gardena Pass leading to Val Gardena (Gröden). All pass roads may be temporarily closed during harsh winter conditions.

=== Neighbouring municipalities ===
The following communities neighbour Badia: Cortina d'Ampezzo, Corvara, Mareo, Livinallongo del Col di Lana, San Martin de Tor, La Val and Sëlva.

=== Frazioni ===
The municipality of Badia contains the frazioni (subdivisions, mainly villages and hamlets) La Ila (La Villa, Stern), San Ciascian (San Cassiano, St. Kassian), and Badia proper consisting of Pedraces (Pedratsches) and San Linêrt (San Leonardo, St. Leonhard) west and east of the Gran Ega river.

== History ==
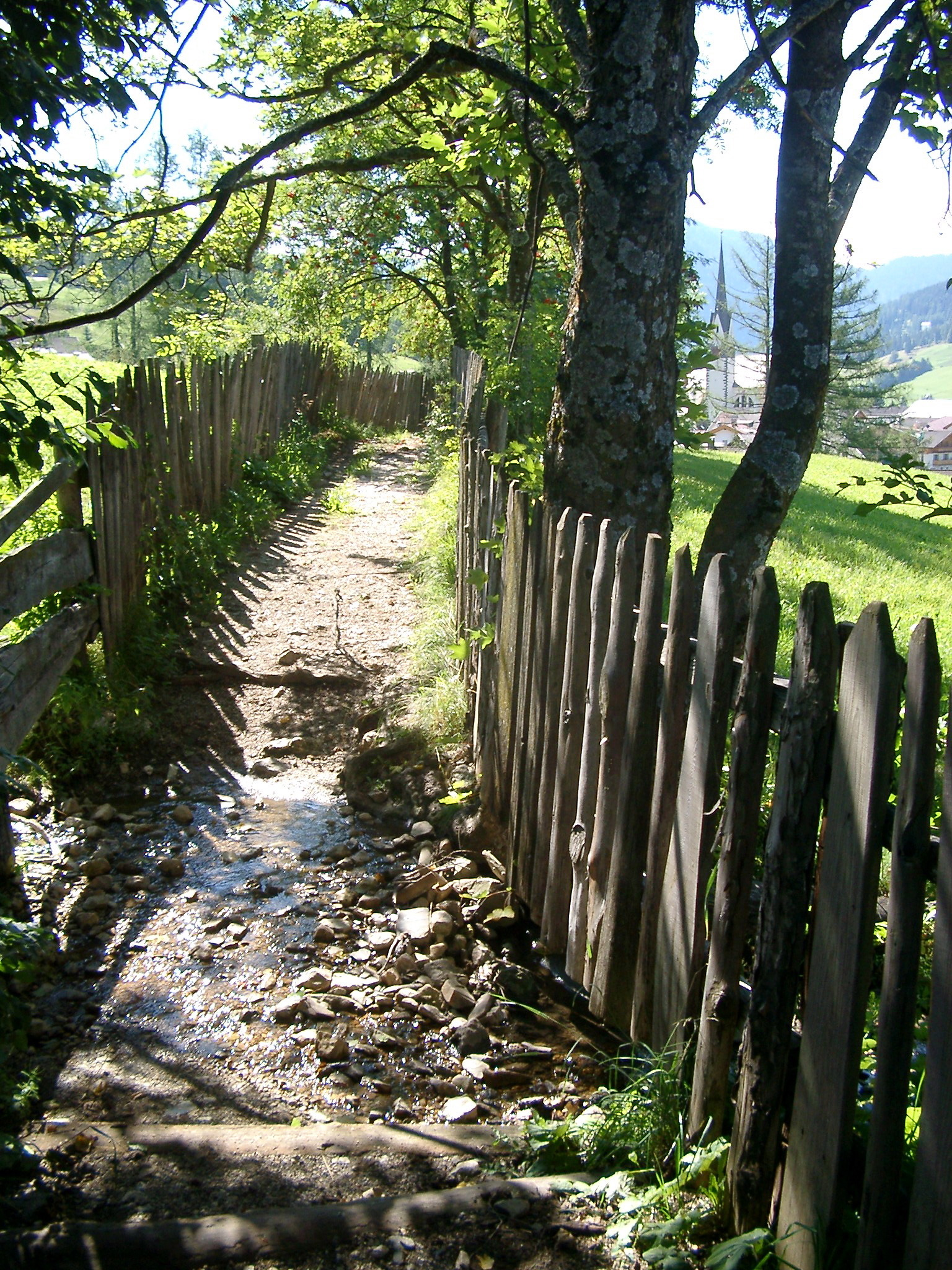
Old path above San Linêrt in Badia

Since the 12th century, the valley estates belonged to the possessions held by the Benedictine nunnery of Sonnenburg near St. Lorenzen, hence the name Abtei ("abbey") first mentioned in a 1325 deed. The nuns had received the lands from the Aribonid counts, who formerly ruled as count palatines in Bavaria. A first parish church was erected in 1347.

While the Puster Valley in the south was held by the Counts of Görz at Lienz, the Ladin language and culture in the Val Badia, due to the remote location, have been preserved up to today. Upon the extinction of the House of Görz in 1500, the estates were inherited by the Austrian House of Habsburg. The Sonnenburg monastery was secularised by order of Emperor Joseph II in 1785. The valley road, originally a bridle path, was rebuilt from 1885 onwards and opened in 1892.

=== Coat of arms ===
The emblem is that of the Winkler von Colz zu Rubatsch noble family which, in the 16th and 17th century, had property and the castle at La Ila. The shield is party per fess, at the top is represented a sable steinbock, holding with the front hoofs a red broken branch on an or background. The lower part is divided into three, with vertex at the top, alternating gules and argent with a rose in the center; every rose has the central petal in or. The emblem was granted in 1967.

== Population ==
=== Linguistic distribution ===
According to the 2024 census, 91.67% of the population speak Ladin, 6.05% Italian and 2.28% German as first language.

Language	1991	2001	2011	2024
Ladin	95.55%	93.43%	94.07%	91.67%
Italian	2.07%	3.88%	4.17%	6.05%
German	2.38%	2.69%	1.76%	2.28%

== Main sights ==
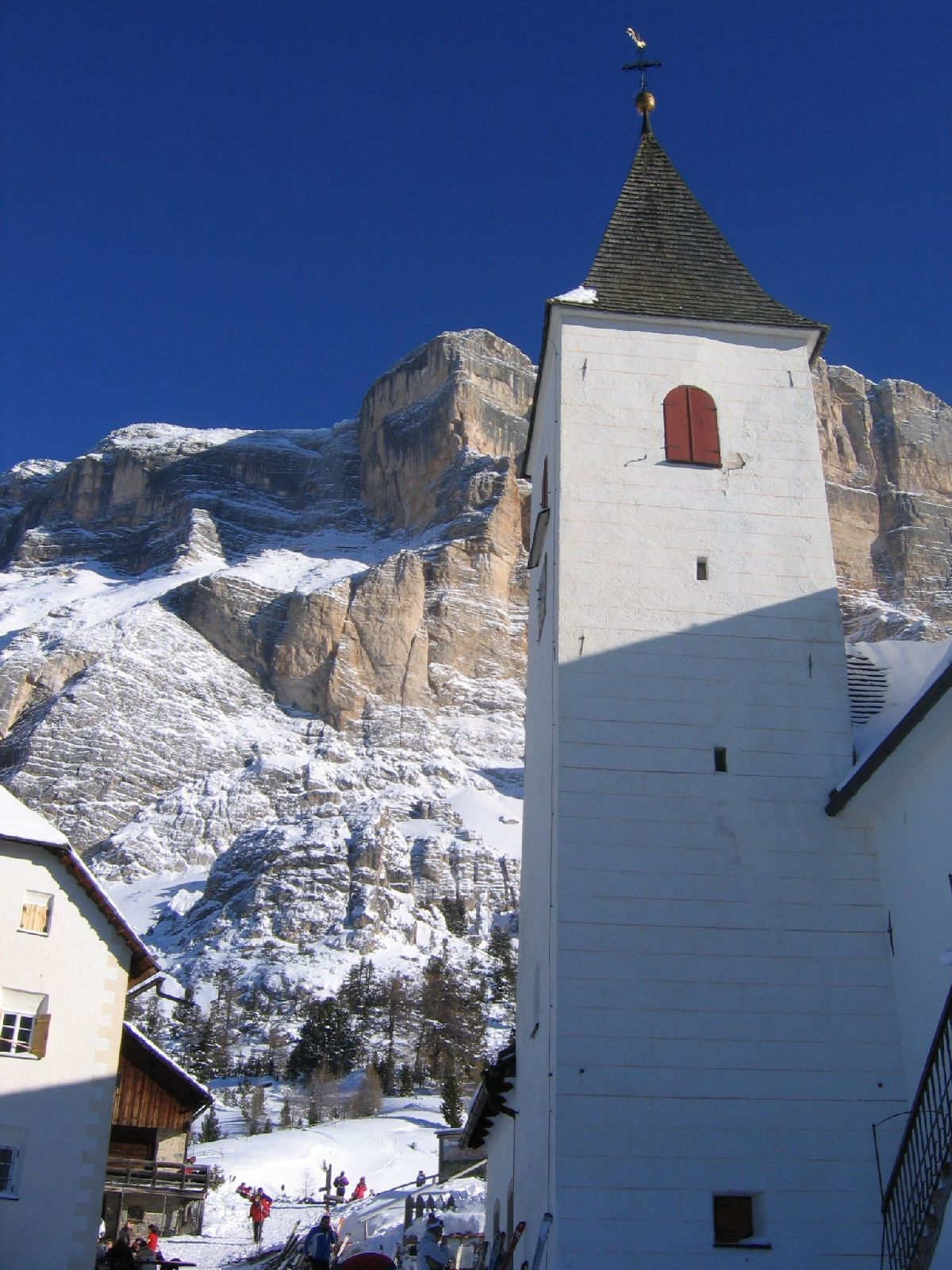
Holy Cross Church and Sas dla Crusc

A pilgrimage church, the Church of the Holy Cross, is located beneath the steep slopes of the Sas dla Crusc massif near the birthplace of Saint Josef Freinademetz. It was consecrated in 1484, the adjacent refuge was erected in 1718.

The parish church of San Ćiascian, dedicated to Saint Cassian of Imola, was consecrated in 1782. Nearby the small Museum Ladin Ursus ladinicus cover the Ladin history of the area and exhibits the skeleton of a cave bear, living here in the glacial period more than 90,000 years ago.

=== Natural areas ===
The massifs in the east and south are part of the Fanes-Sennes-Prags Nature Park, with the notable summit of Sas dla Crusc rising up to 2,907 m (9,537 ft); the chains in the west belong to the Puez-Geisler Nature Park. Badia is also near the mountains of Lagazuoi (2,778 m), Conturines (3,064 m), La Varela (3,055 m), L'Ciaval (Kreuzkofel) (2,907 m) and Gardenaccia (2,500 m).

== Notable people ==
- Micurà de Rü (1789–1847), born in Rü near San Ćiascian, Ladin linguist.
- Joseph Freinademetz (1852–1908), born in the hamlet of Oies, Catholic saint and missionary to China.
- Maria Canins (born 1949), born in La Villa, Alta Badia, an Italian racing cyclist, rode at the 1984 and 1988 Summer Olympics.

== Economy ==
As in other Ladin-speaking communities in South Tyrol, tourism is the most important contributor to Badia's economy. Around 69% of the population work in the service sector, around 21% work in production, and around 10% work in agriculture, however most of these hold other jobs as well and farm on the side.

== Sport ==
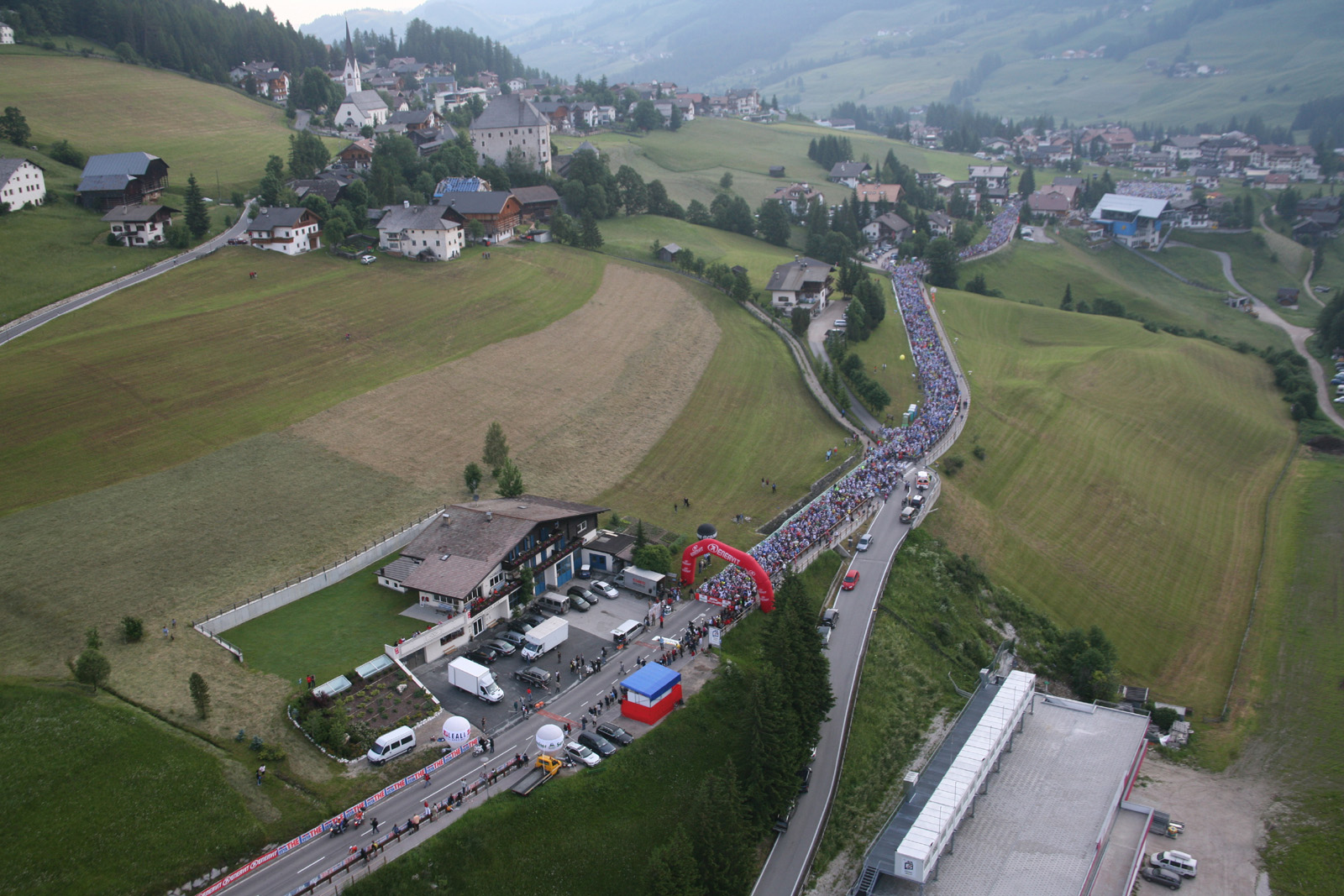
Maratona dles Dolomites start in La Ila

=== Maratona dles Dolomites ===
The start of the annual single-day seven mountain passes crossing Maratona dles Dolomites bicycle race is every year in La Ila.
