= Gardena Pass =

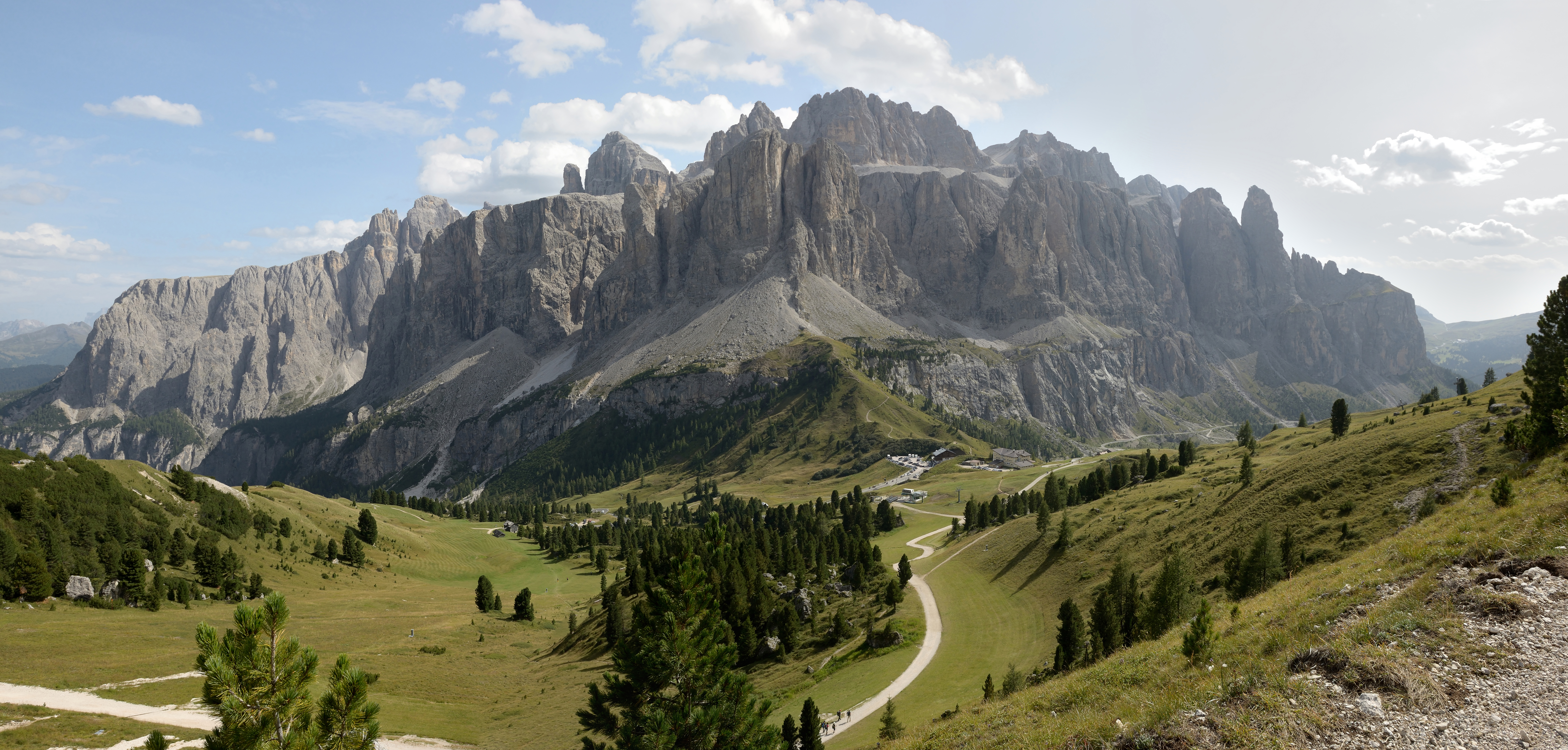
- View of Gardena Pass and Sella group from Pizes de Cir

- Location within Alps
- Elevation: 2,136 metres (7,008 ft)

Third Approach
- Location: South Tyrol, Italy
- Range: Dolomites
- Coordinates: 46°33′0″N 11°48′34″E

Gardena Pass (Italian: Passo Gardena; German: Grödnerjoch; Ladin: Ju de Frara or Jëuf de Frea) is a high mountain pass in the Dolomites of the South Tyrol in northeast Italy.

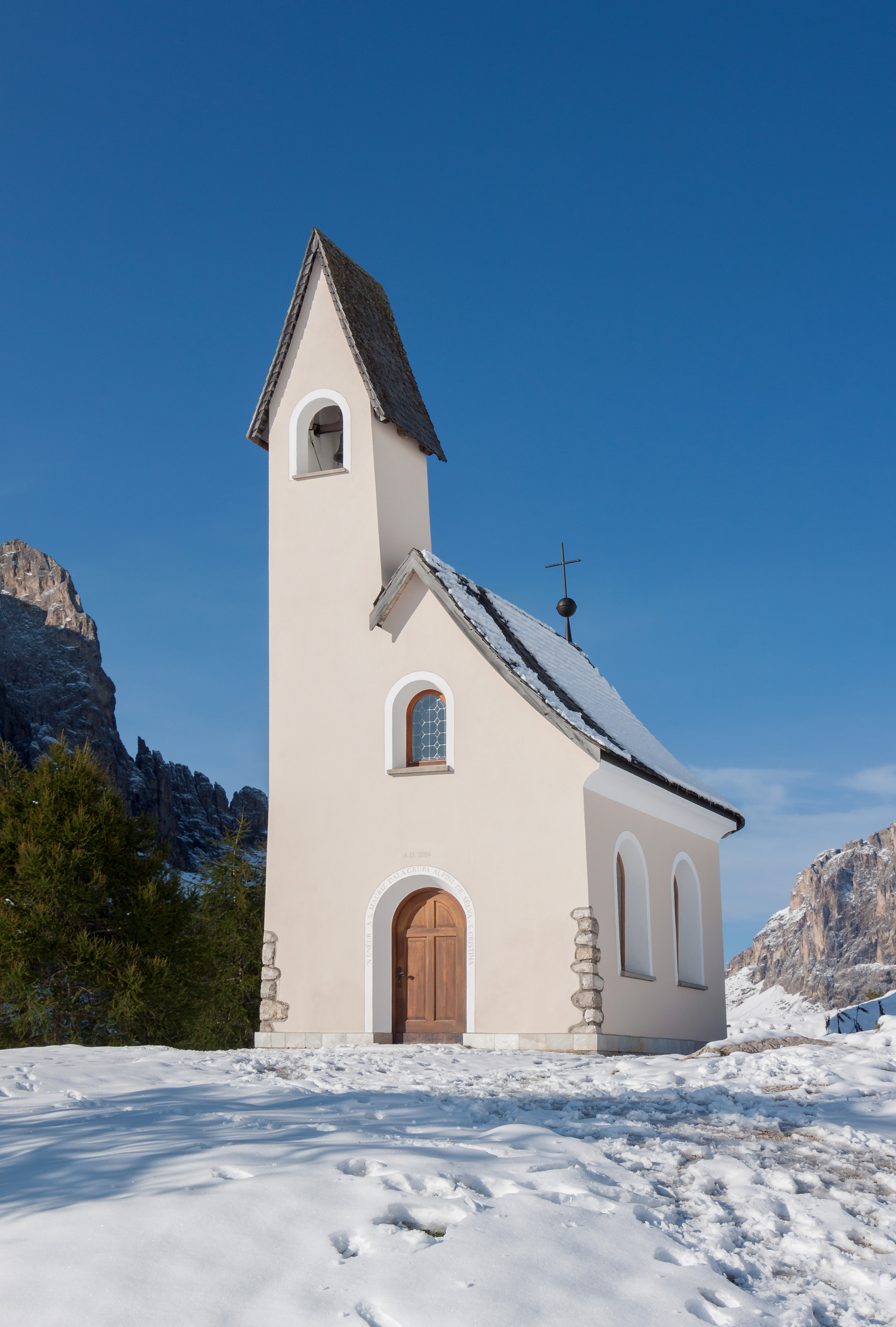
Cappella di San Maurizio

At an elevation of 2,136 m (7,008 ft) above sea level, the pass connects Sëlva in the Val Gardena on the west side with Corvara in the Val Badia. The road over it comprises part of the famous Sella Ring, in which four linked passes (Gardena, Sella, Pordoi, and Campolongo) encircle the spectacular Sella group. The pass has 19 unnumbered hairpin bends. The route becomes busy with tourists, motorcyclists, and cyclists during the summer. There are tourist accommodations on the pass itself, and hikers visit the pass to access the dramatic Dolomite mountains.

== Pizes de Cir ==
North of the pass in the direct vicinity, the mountain range Pizes de Cir with 2592 meter high peak the Gran Cir can be seen.

== Maratona dles Dolomites ==
The Gardena Pass is the fourth of seven Dolomite mountain passes which riders cross in the annual Maratona dles Dolomites single-day bicycle race.

== World Cup ski racing ==
Men's World Cup alpine ski races are held annually in mid-December on both sides of the pass, with a downhill at Val Gardena and the classic Gran Risa giant slalom at Alta Badia.

== See also ==
- List of highest paved roads in Europe
- List of mountain passes
