= Sella Pass =

Mountain pass in Italy

- Sella Pass

- Location within Alps
- Elevation: 2,218 metres (7,277 ft)

Third Approach
- Location: South Tyrol, Trentino, Italy
- Range: Dolomites
- Coordinates: 46°30′31″N 11°45′46″E

The Sella Pass (German: Sellajoch; Ladin: Jëuf de Sela or Jouf de Sela; Italian: Passo Sella) (2218 m) is a high mountain pass between the provinces of Trentino and South Tyrol in Italy.

It connects the Val Gherdëina in South Tyrol and Canazei in the Fascia Valley in Trentino.

With Pordoi Pass, Gardena Pass, and Campolongo Pass, this pass forms a quadrangle around the Sella group. In the winter, ski trails are prepared that make the entire round in both directions, known as the Sella Ronda.

== Maratona dles Dolomites ==
The Sella Pass is the third of seven Dolomites mountain passes riders cross in the annual Maratona dles Dolomites single-day bicycle race. It is also on the route of the Dolomites Gold Cup Race.

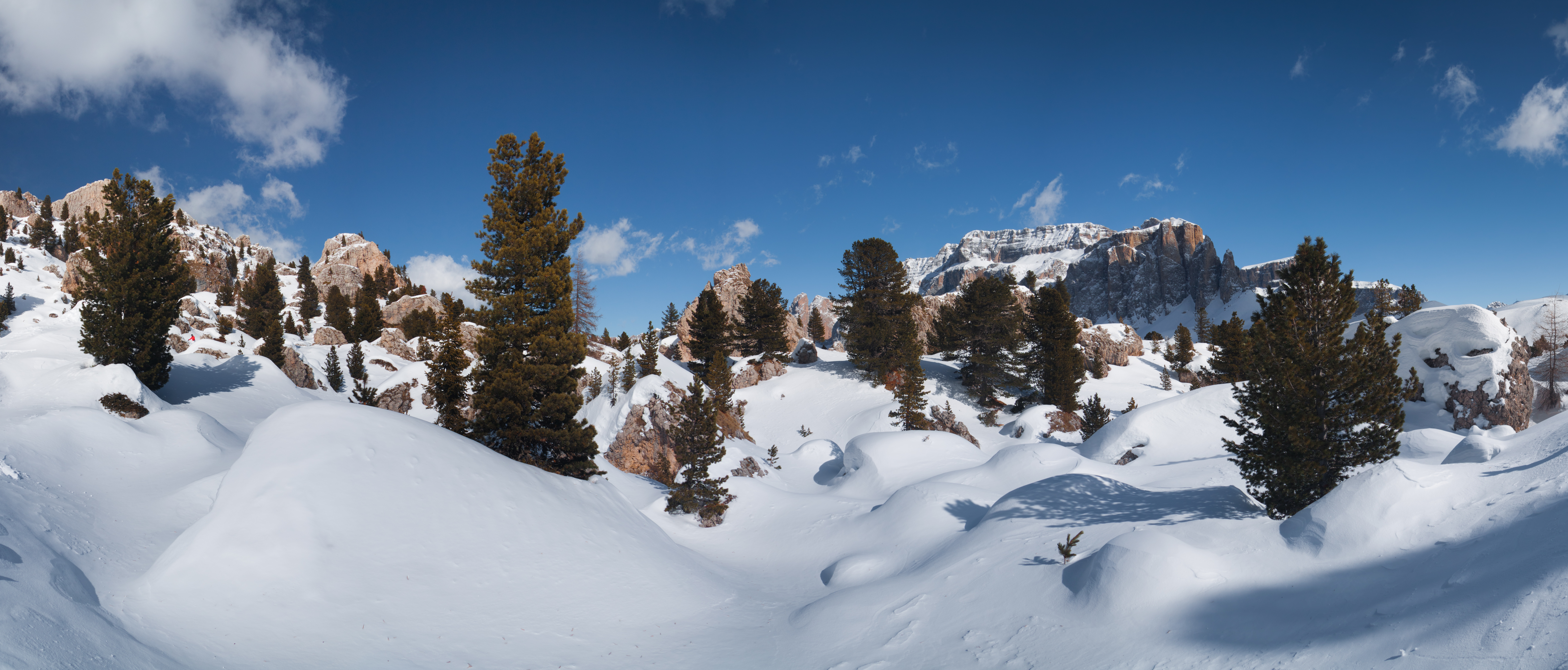
Sella Pass

== See also ==
- List of highest paved roads in Europe
- List of mountain passes
