= Pordoi Pass =

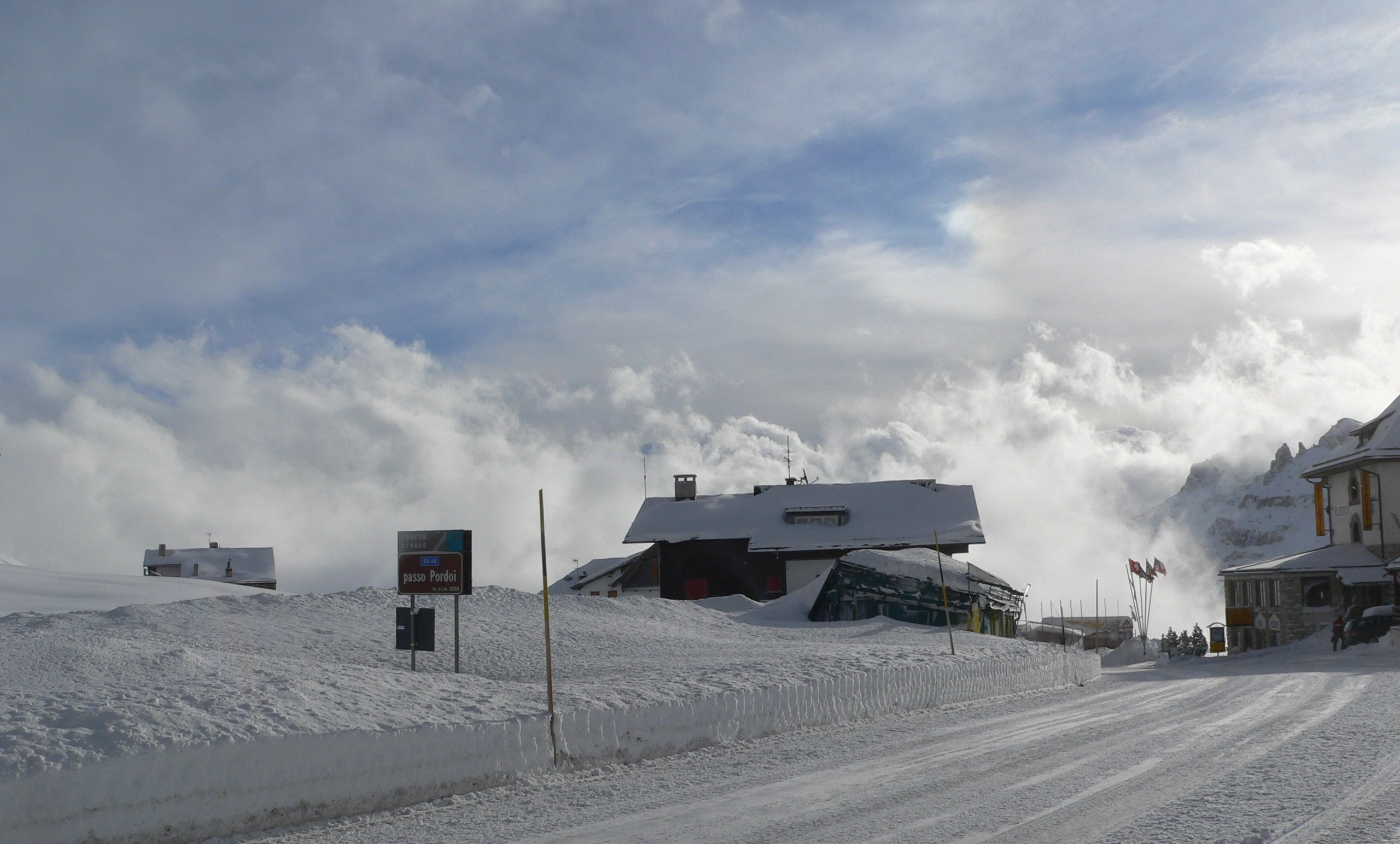
- Pordoi Pass in February.

- Location within Alps
- Elevation: 2,239 metres (7,346 ft)

Third Approach
- Location: Italy
- Range: Dolomites
- Coordinates: 46°29′04.92″N 11°50′09.96″E

Pordoi is a pass in the Dolomites in the Alps, located between the Sella group in the north and the Marmolada group in the south. The pass is at an altitude of 2,239 m (7,346 ft), and the road crossing the pass connects Arabba (Livinallongo del Col di Lana) with Canazei (Fassa Valley). It is the second highest surfaced road traversing a pass in the Dolomites, after the Sella Pass.

Starting from Arabba, the ascent to the top is 9.4 km (5.84 mi) long. Over this distance, the elevation gain is 637 m (2,090 ft), with the average percentage of 6.8%.

== Maratona dles Dolomites ==
Pordoi Pass is the second of seven Dolomite mountain passes that cyclists cross in the annual Maratona dles Dolomites single-day bicycle race.

A memorial to Fausto Coppi stands at the summit of the pass that commemorates the world-renowned Giro d'Italia tour.

== Gallery ==
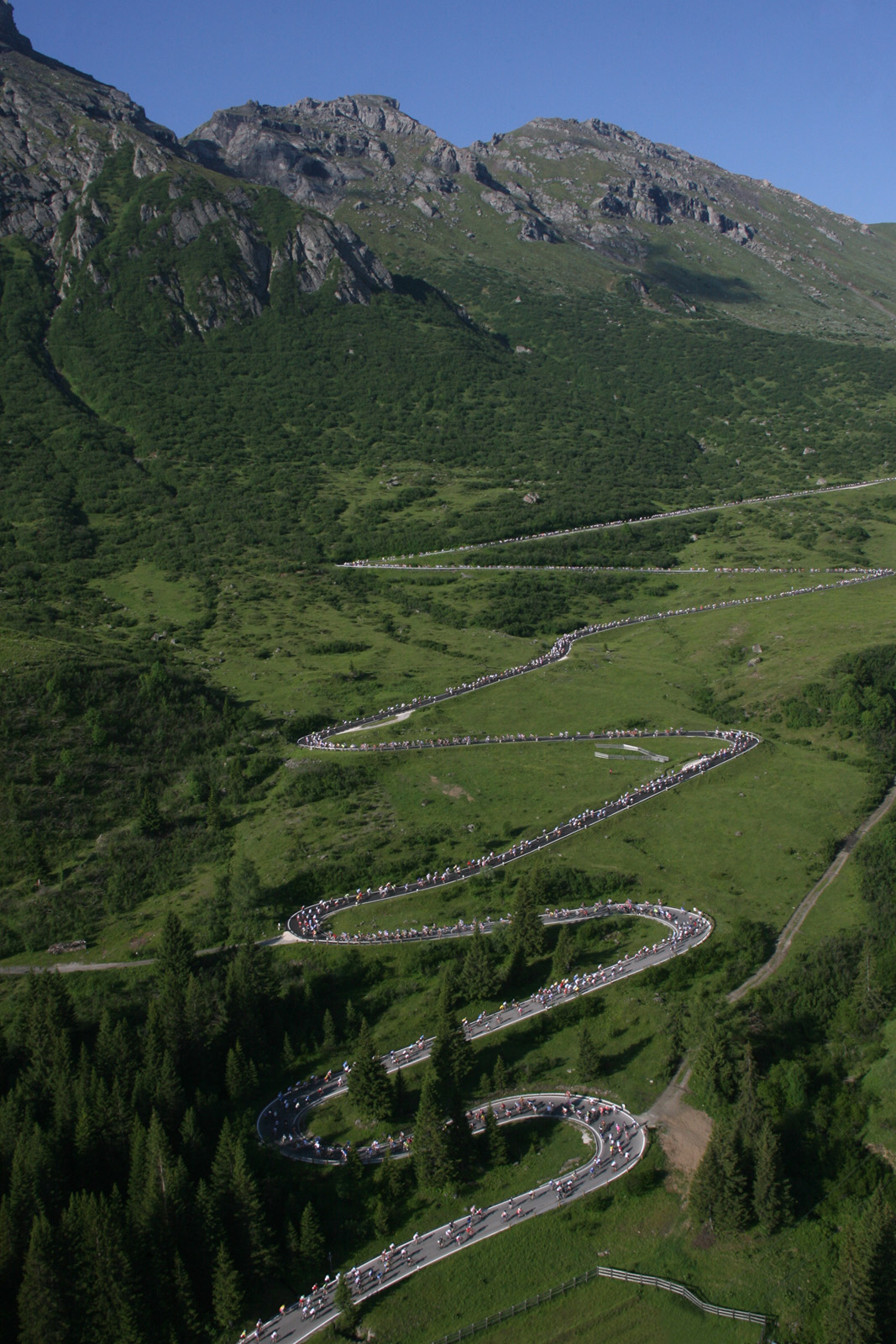
Maratona dles Dolomites ascent to Pordoi Pass

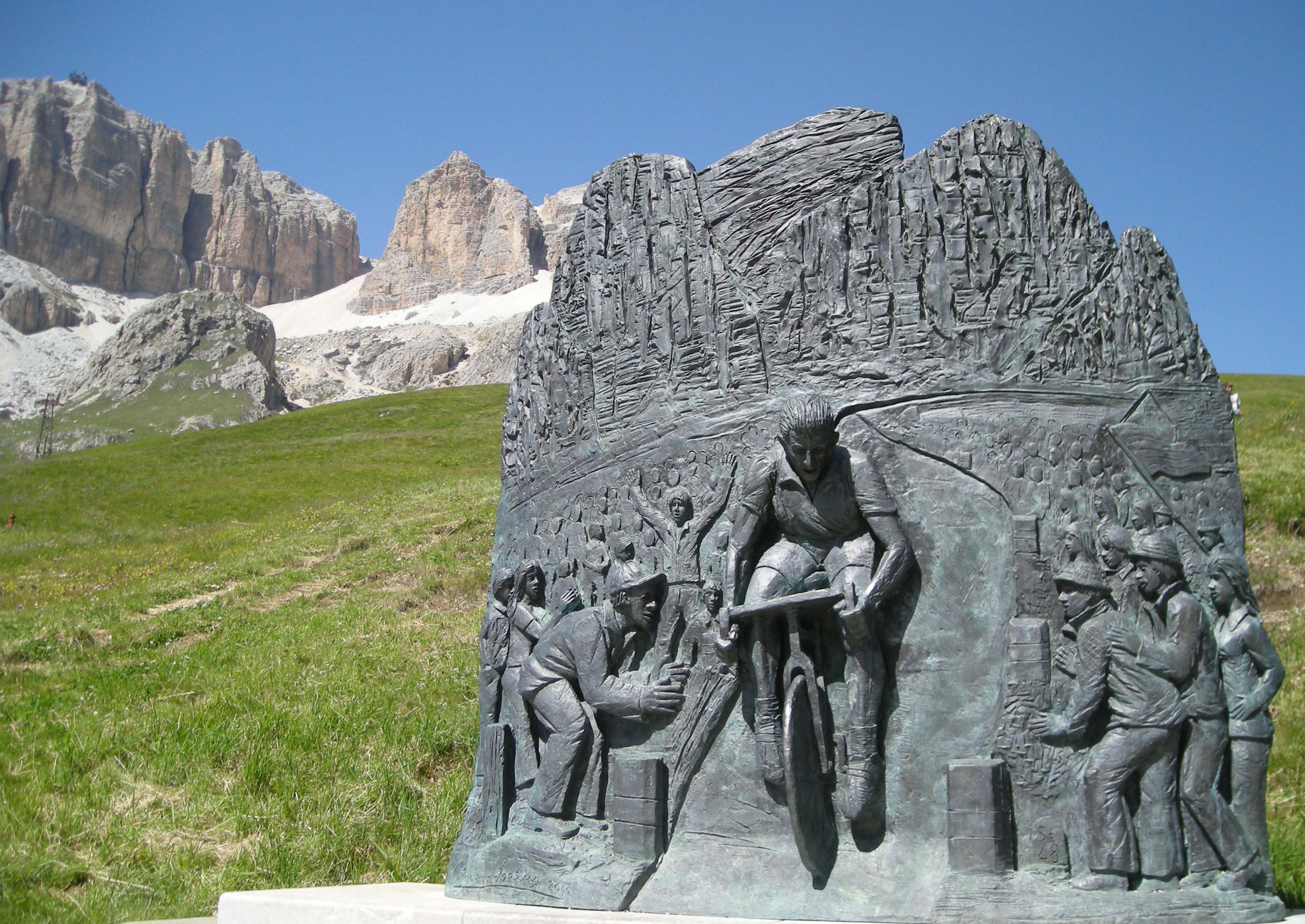
Memorial to Fausto Coppi in the Pordoi Pass

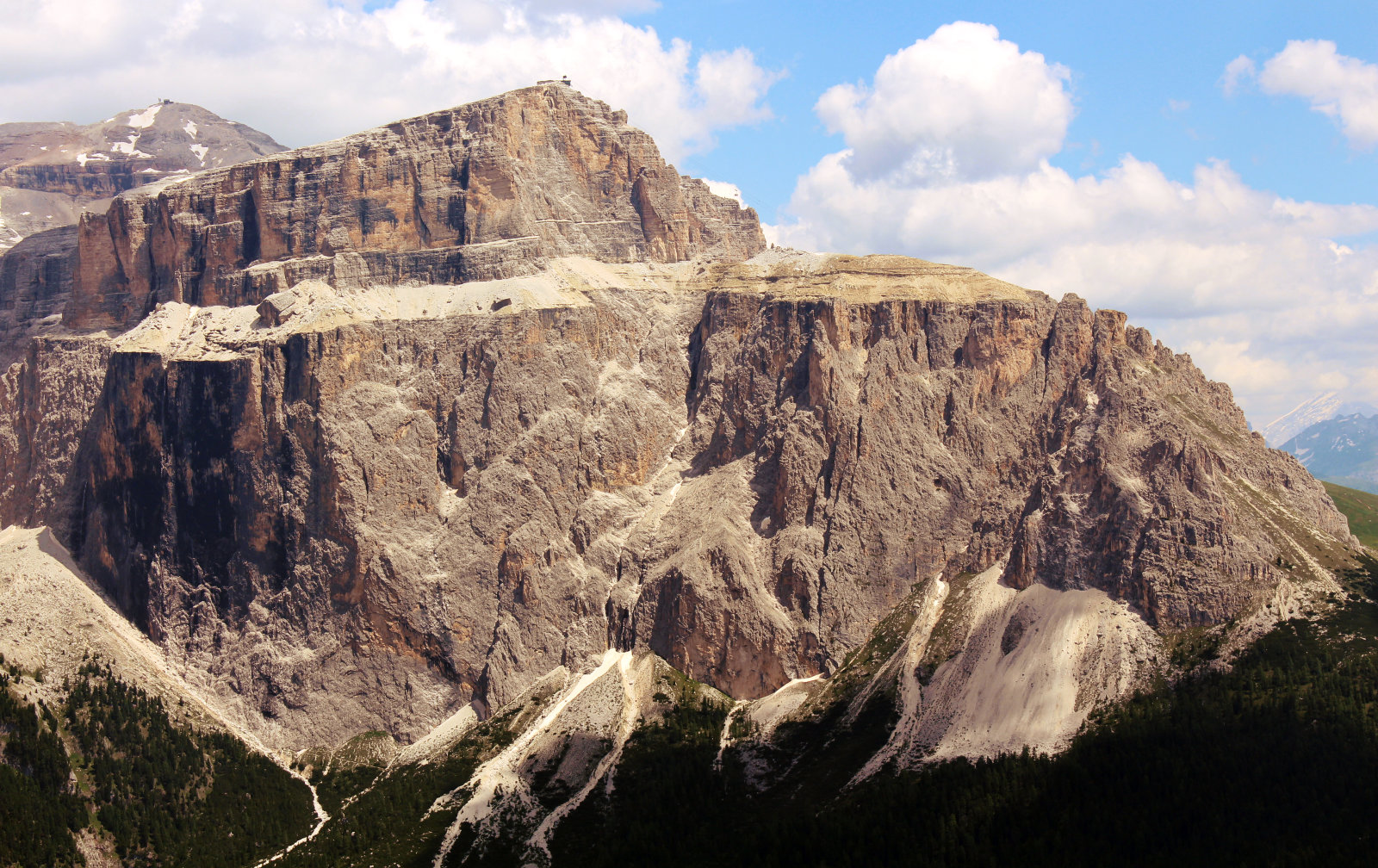
A view of Sass Pordoi

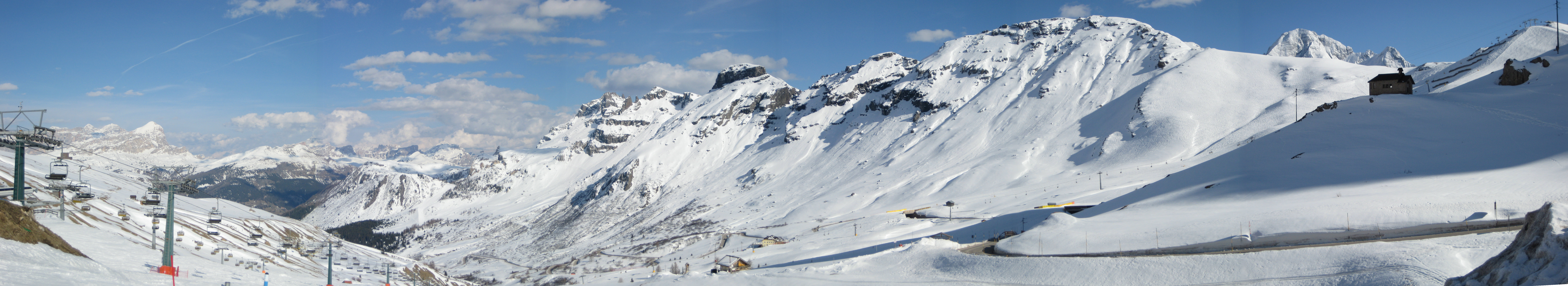
View from Pordoi Pass looking east

== See also ==
- List of highest paved roads in Europe
- List of mountain passes
