= Campolongo Pass =

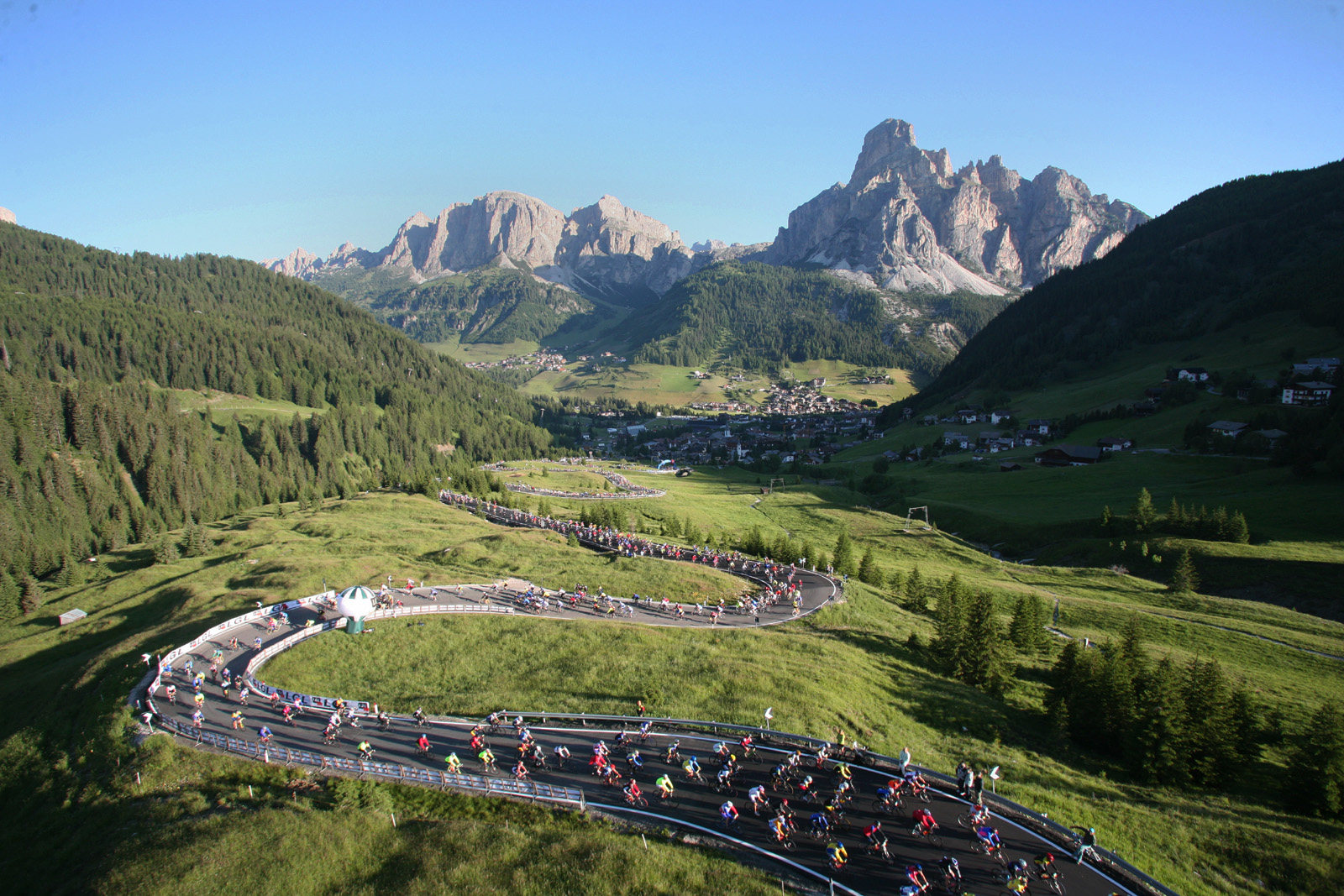
- Maratona dles Dolomites ascent to Campolongo Pass (Corvara in the background)

- Location within Alps
- Elevation: 1,875 metres (6,152 ft)

Third Approach
- Location: Trentino, Italy
- Range: Dolomites
- Coordinates: 46°31′12″N 11°52′27″E

The Campolongo Pass (German: Campolongo-Pass, Italian: Passo Campolongo, Ladin: Ju de Ćiaulunch) (1875 m) is a high mountain pass in the Dolomites in South Tyrol in Italy.

It connects Corvara in the Val Badia and Arabba.

The pass can be crossed in winter on skis.

== Maratona dles Dolomites ==
The Campolongo Pass is the first of seven Dolomites mountain passes riders cross in the annual Maratona dles Dolomites single-day bicycle race. The Campolongo is the only one of the seven passes to be ascended twice.

== See also ==
- List of highest paved roads in Europe
- List of mountain passes
