= Val Badia =

Italian valley

Coordinates: 46°41′N 11°54′E

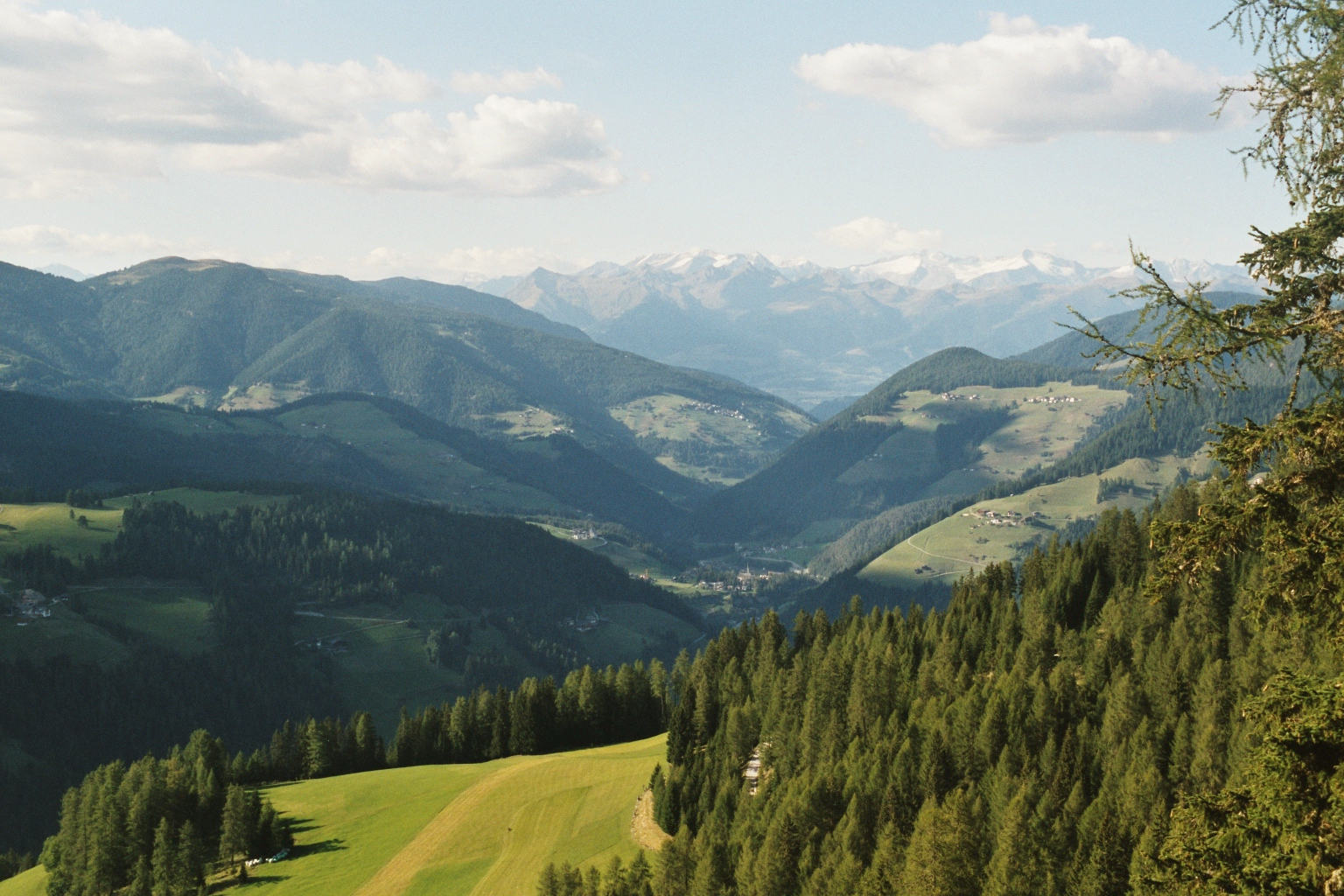
View northwards to San Martin de Tor

The Val Badia (English: Badia Valley, Ladin: Val Badia; Italian: Val Badia; German: Gadertal) is the valley of the Gran Ega river in South Tyrol, Italy. It stretches from the Sella massif northwards to the Puster Valley. The villages in the Val Badia, whose population are predominantly Ladin-speaking, belong to the following municipalities: Badia, Corvara, La Val, Mareo and San Martin de Tor.

Piza Scotoni and Piza Fanes de Medo peaks

The upper part of the valley, starting from the village San Linêrt and including Badia, Corvara and La Val, is called in German Abteital. The same area is under the name Alta Badia a renowned ski resort.

Conturines, Piza Scotoni and Piza Fanes de Medo peaks
