= Livinallongo del Col di Lana =

Livinallongo del Col di Lana Fodóm (Ladin)
- Comune
- Comune di Livinallongo del Col di Lana
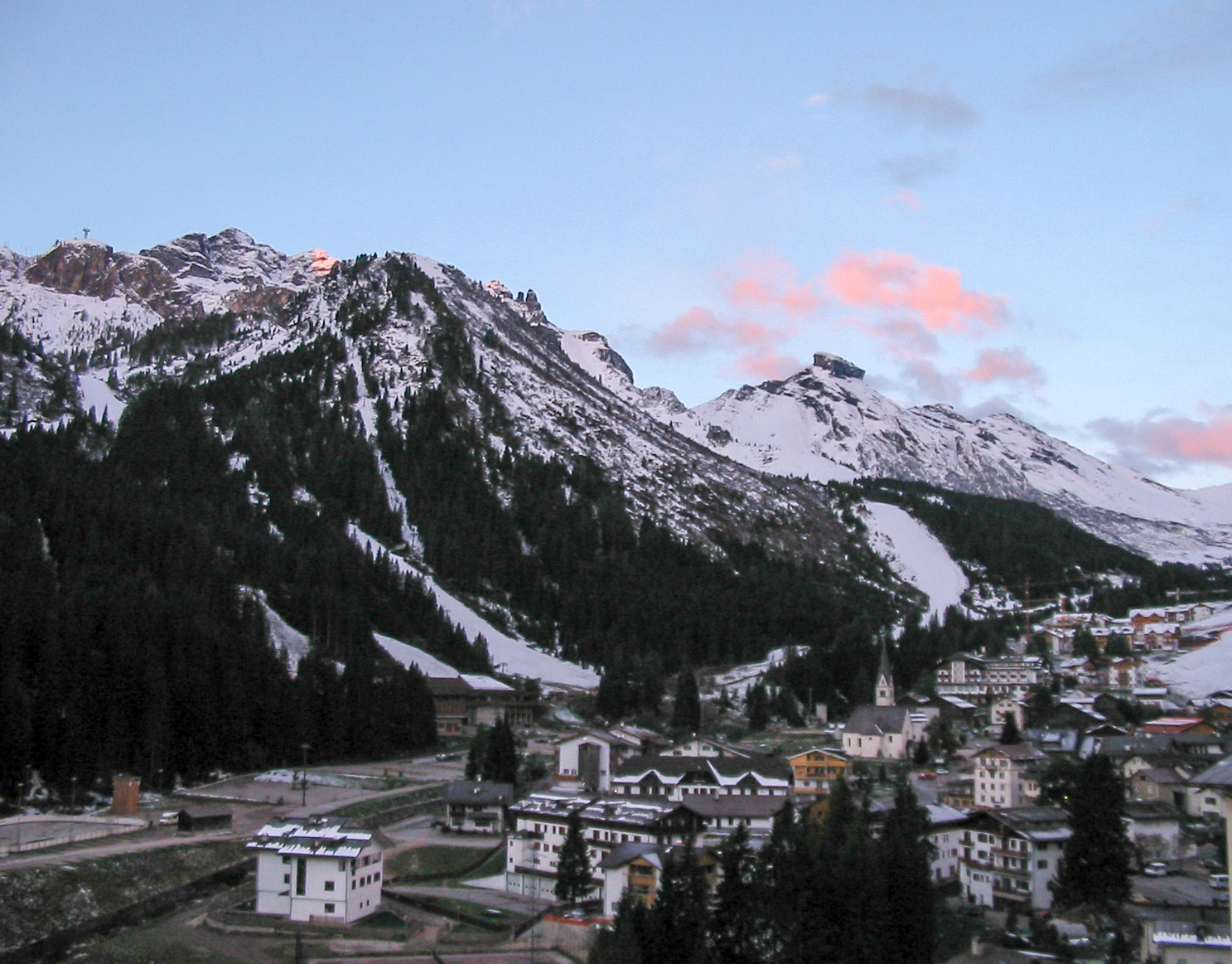

- Location within Italy Location within Veneto
- Coordinates: 46°29′N 11°57′E
- Country: Italy
- Region: Veneto
- Province: Belluno (BL)
- Frazioni: Arabba

Government
  - Mayor: Ugo Ruaz

Area
  - Total: 99.1 km^{2} (38.3 sq mi)
- Elevation: 1,645 m (5,397 ft)

Population (2007)
  - Total: 1,443
  - Density: 14.6/km^{2} (37.7/sq mi)
- Demonym: Fodomi
- Time zone: UTC+1 (CET)
  - Summer (DST): UTC+2 (CEST)
- Postal code: 32020
- Dialing code: 0436
- Patron saint: Saint James
- Saint day: 25 June
- Website: http://www.comune.livinallongo.bl.it

Livinallongo del Col di Lana (pronounced [livinalˈloŋɡo del ˌkɔl di ˈlaːna]; Ladin: Fodóm; German: Buchenstein) is a comune (municipality) in the Province of Belluno in the Italian region Veneto, located about 120 kilometres (75 mi) north of Venice and about 45 kilometres (28 mi) northwest of Belluno.

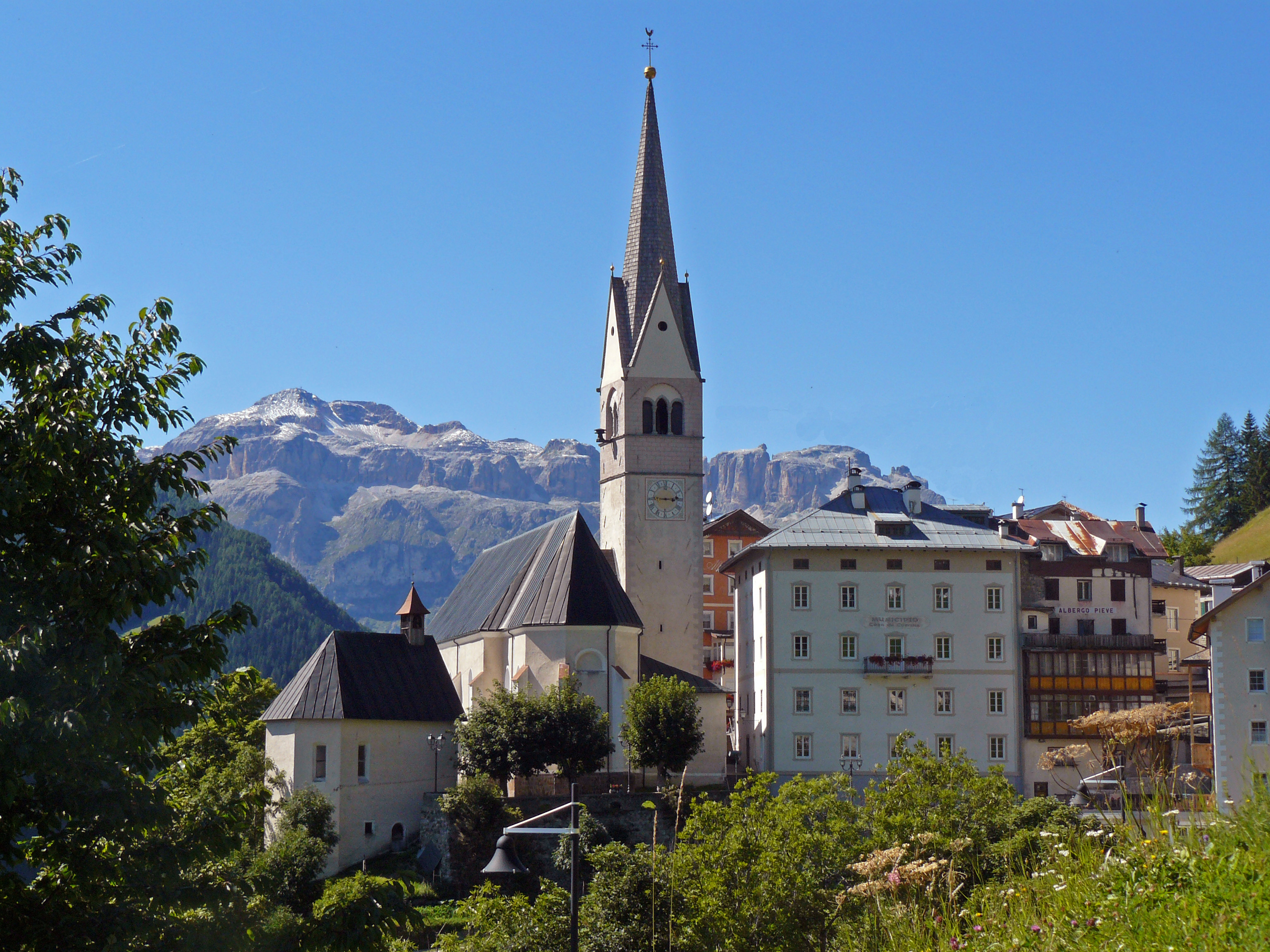
the Parish Church

Approximately half of the population speak Ladin as their native language.

== Twin towns ==
Livinallongo del Col di Lana is twinned with:

- Gubbio, Italy, since 2014
