= Sella group =

Mountain range in the Dolomites of Italy

Coordinates: 46°30′N 11°50′E

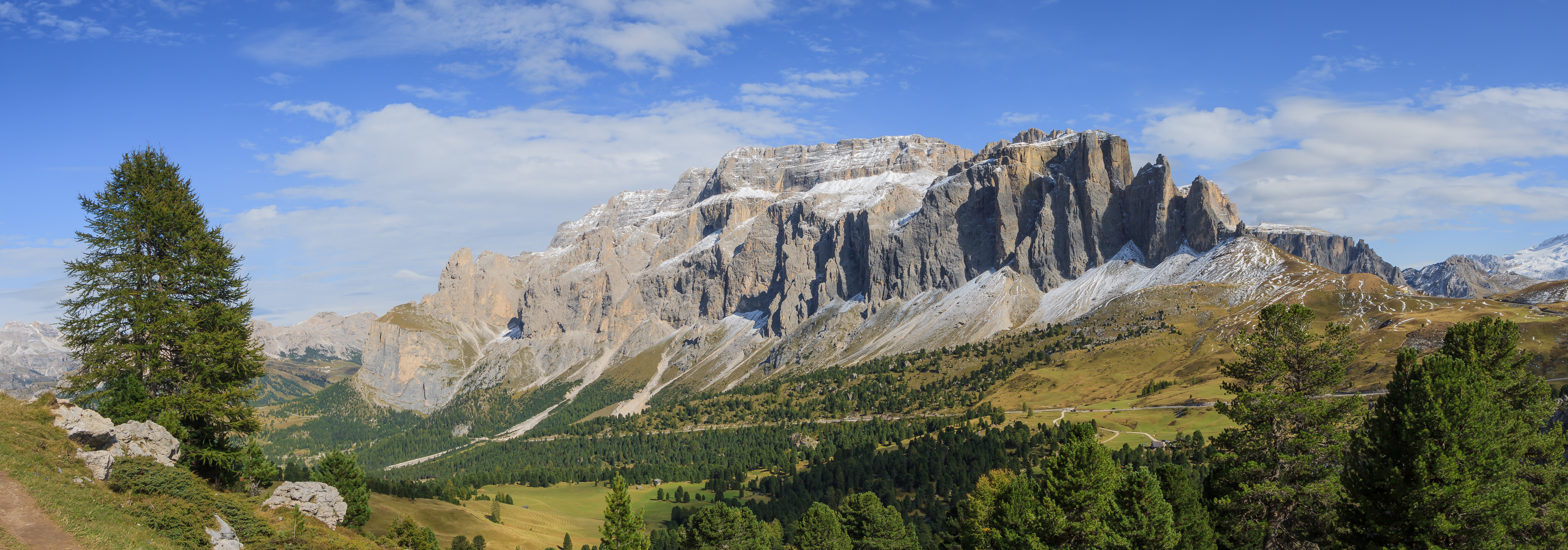
View from west to the Sella group

The Sella group (German: Sellagruppe; Ladin: Mëisules or L Sela) is a plateau-shaped massif in the Dolomites mountains of northern Italy. The Sella lies north of the Marmolada and east of the Langkofel. The highest peak is Piz Boè at 3,151 m (10,338 ft) above sea level.

== Climate ==
The plateau of the Sella Group is characterized by a tundra climate with average temperatures above 0 °C only during the summer months. Average data at the weather station on Piz Pisciadù at 2,985 m (9,793 ft) measured between 2004 and 2020 shows that the average temperature in summer lies around +3 °C and +5 °C, while in winter it ranges between -8 and -10 °C.

Climate data for Piz Pisciadù (period: 2004–2020; altitude: 2,985 m)
Month	Jan	Feb	Mar	Apr	May	Jun	Jul	Aug	Sep	Oct	Nov	Dec	Year
Record high °C (°F)	4.6 (40.3)	5.8 (42.4)	5.6 (42.1)	9.5 (49.1)	13.2 (55.8)	16.1 (61.0)	16.0 (60.8)	16.8 (62.2)	12.4 (54.3)	11.9 (53.4)	7.4 (45.3)	6.5 (43.7)	16.8 (62.2)
Mean daily maximum °C (°F)	−7.1 (19.2)	−7.3 (18.9)	−5.1 (22.8)	−1.5 (29.3)	1.4 (34.5)	5.9 (42.6)	8.3 (46.9)	8.1 (46.6)	4.4 (39.9)	1.2 (34.2)	−2.7 (27.1)	−5.9 (21.4)	0.0 (32.0)
Daily mean °C (°F)	−9.8 (14.4)	−10.2 (13.6)	−8.2 (17.2)	−4.6 (23.7)	−1.5 (29.3)	2.9 (37.2)	5.1 (41.2)	5.2 (41.4)	1.8 (35.2)	−1.2 (29.8)	−5.0 (23.0)	−8.4 (16.9)	−2.8 (27.0)
Mean daily minimum °C (°F)	−12.4 (9.7)	−12.8 (9.0)	−10.9 (12.4)	−7.2 (19.0)	−4.1 (24.6)	0.3 (32.5)	2.4 (36.3)	2.6 (36.7)	−0.6 (30.9)	−3.5 (25.7)	−7.3 (18.9)	−10.9 (12.4)	−5.4 (22.3)
Record low °C (°F)	−25.1 (−13.2)	−28.0 (−18.4)	−24.5 (−12.1)	−19.1 (−2.4)	−13.8 (7.2)	−11.8 (10.8)	−6.4 (20.5)	−7.1 (19.2)	−11.3 (11.7)	−17.1 (1.2)	−22.5 (−8.5)	−26.2 (−15.2)	−28.0 (−18.4)
Source: Landeswetterdienst Südtirol

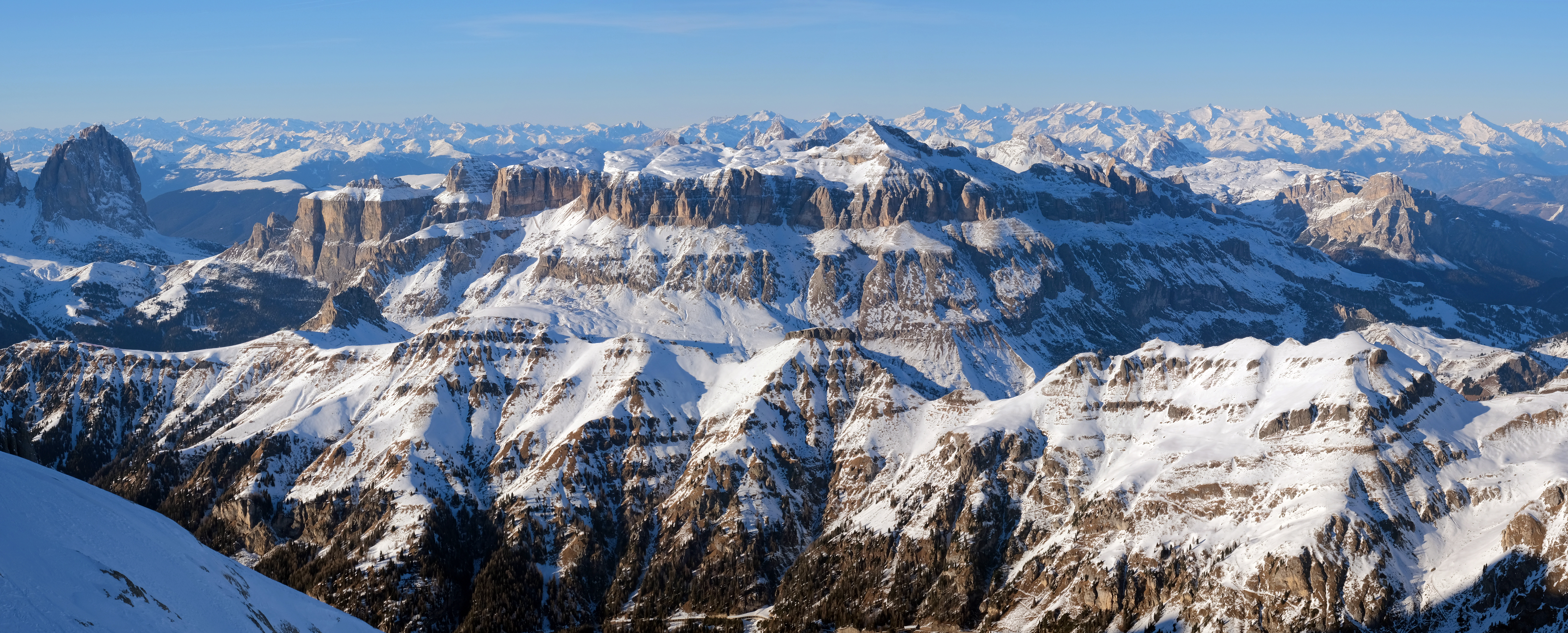
Winter view of Sella group from Marmolada.

== Gallery ==
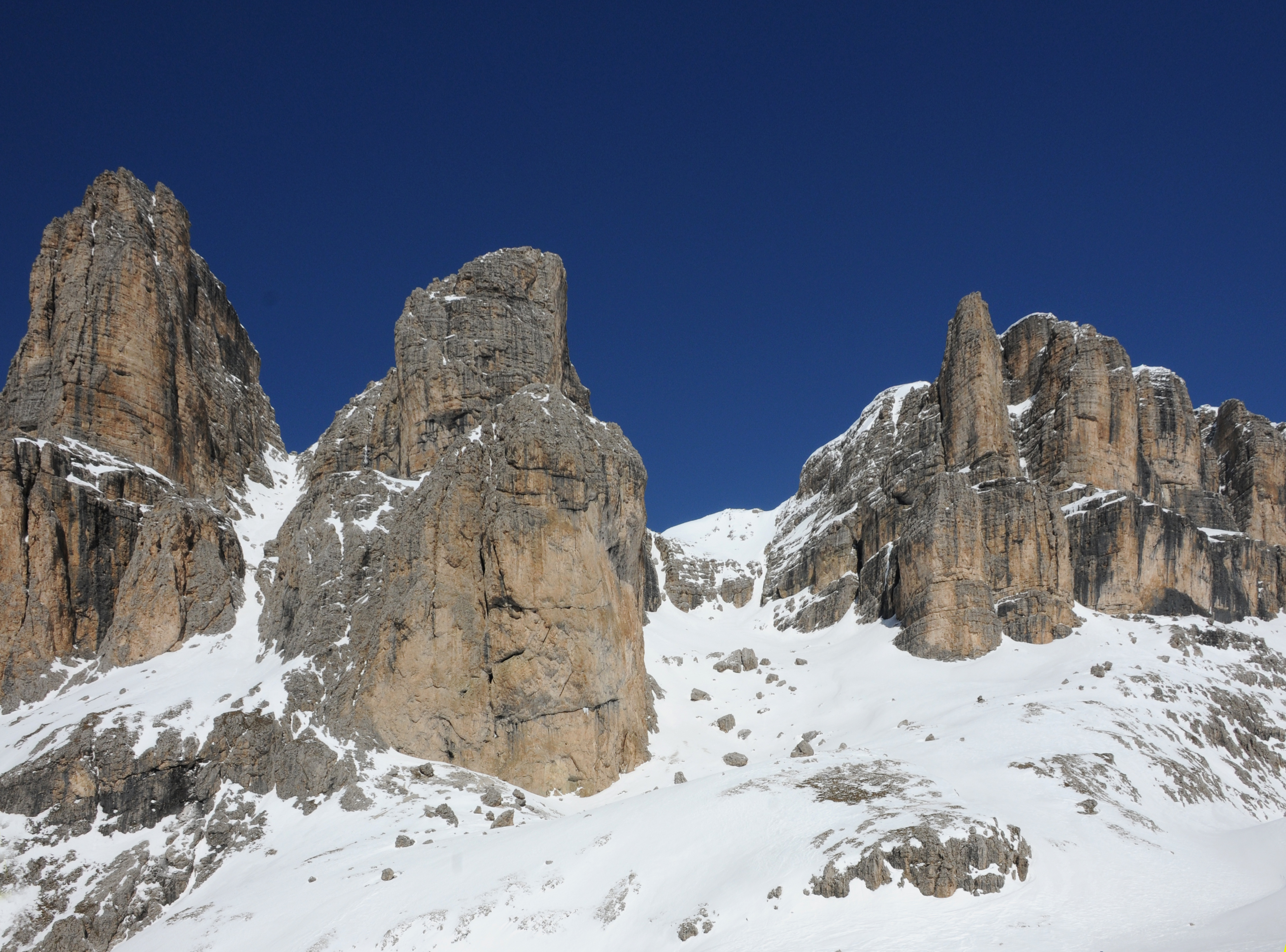
Sella group from the Lasties Valley

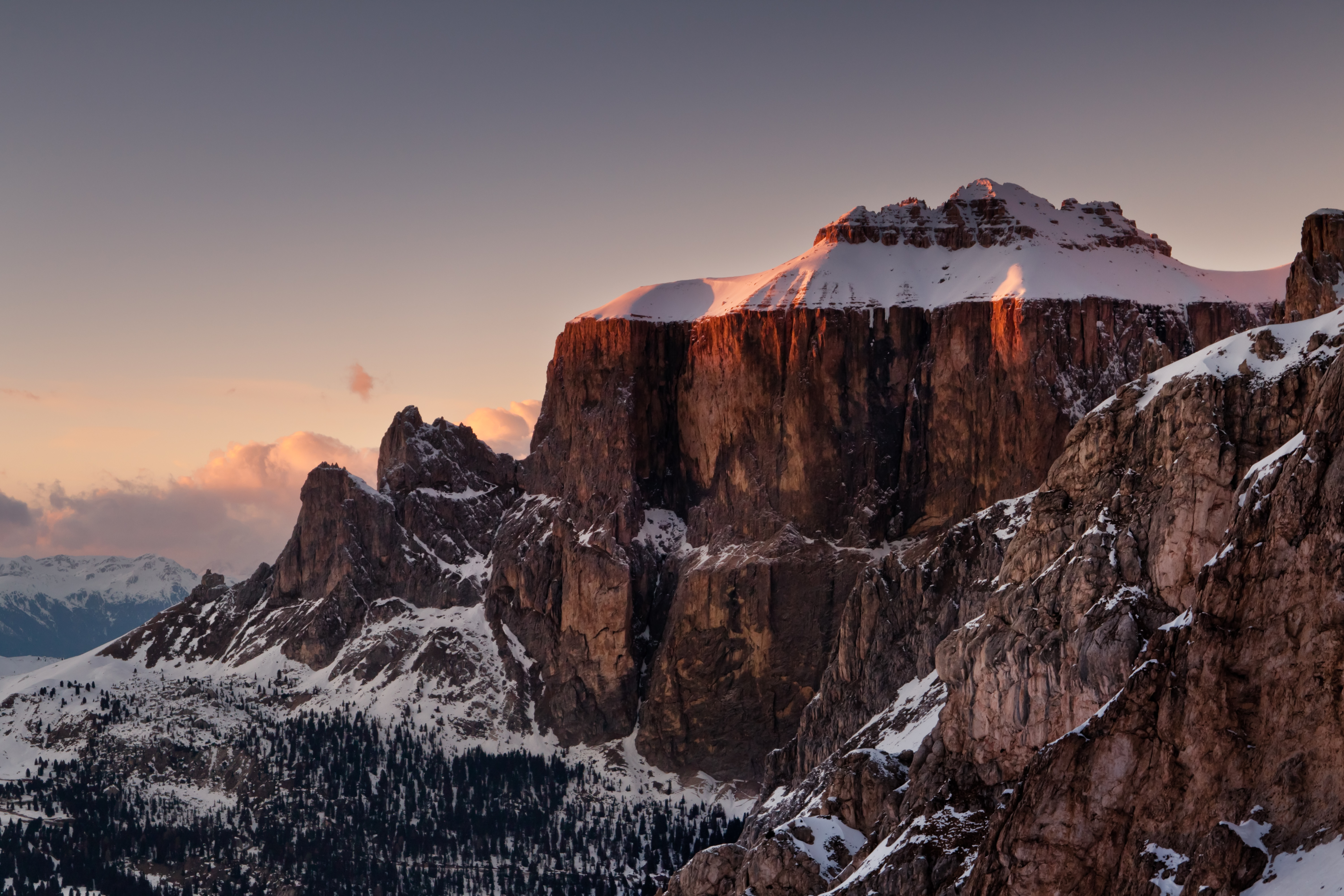
Sella group in the evening

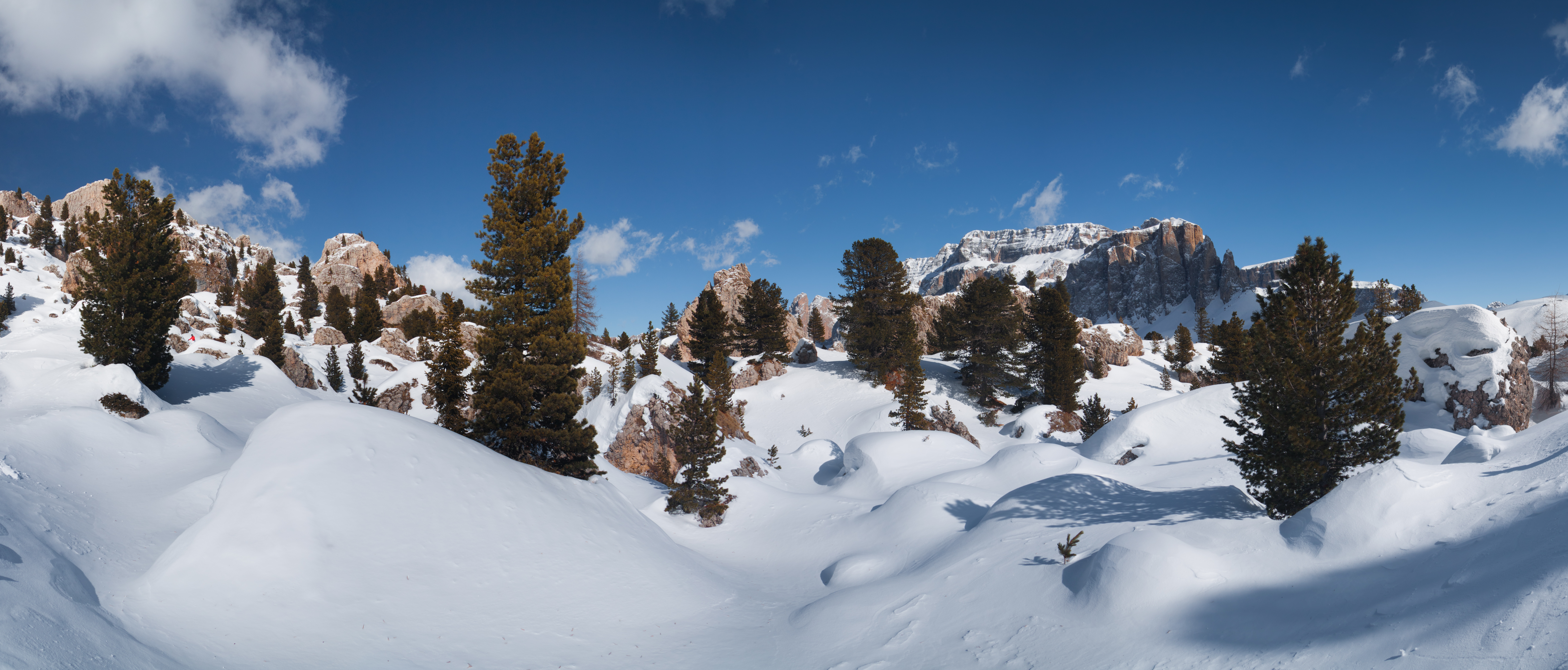
The Sella group seen from Sella Pass

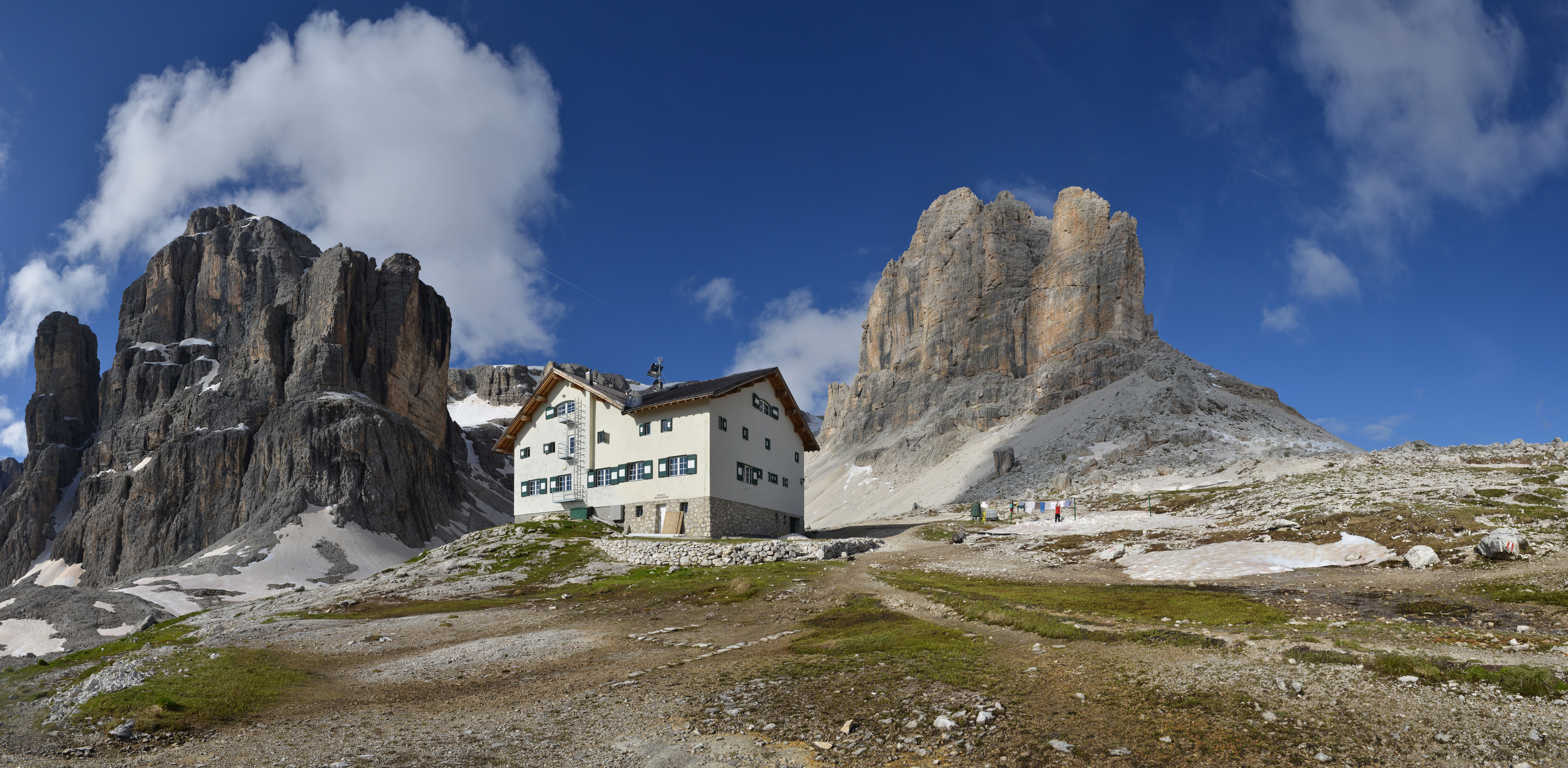
Pisciadùhütte (2587 m)

== See also ==
- Ladinia
