= Ladinia =

- Flag

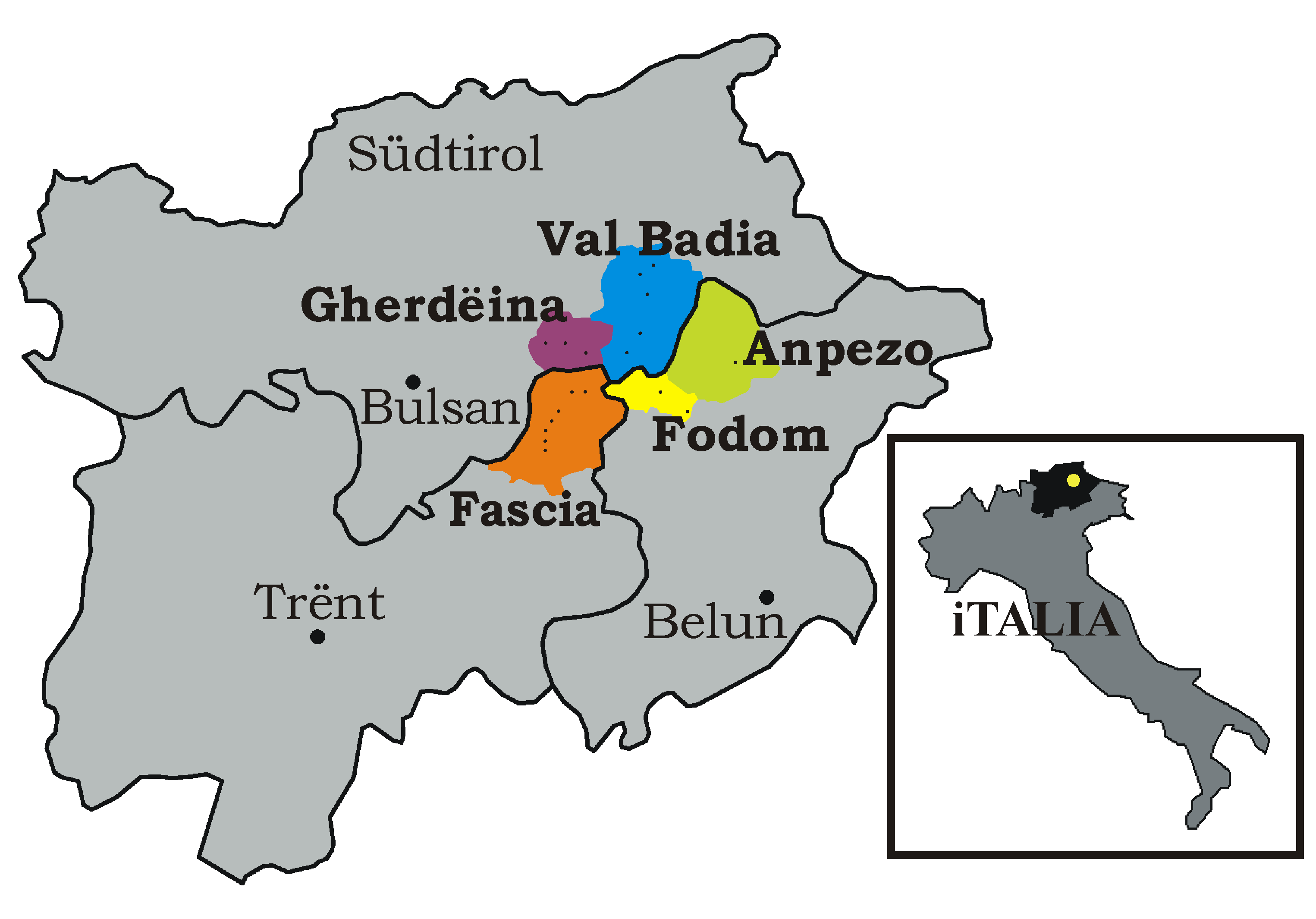
- Distribution of Ladin speakers
- Country: Italy
- Regions: Trentino-Alto Adige/Südtirol, Veneto
- Provinces: South Tyrol, Trentino, Belluno

Area
  - Total: 1,191 km^{2} (460 sq mi)

Population
  - Total: 36,613
  - Summer (DST): UTC +1

Ladinia is an Alpine region in the Dolomites mountain range of Northern Italy, divided between the Italian provinces of Belluno, South Tyrol, and Trentino. The area takes its name from its inhabitants, the Ladin people, a Romance-speaking ethnic group. Their Ladin language is generally considered a Rhaeto-Romance language, though there is a scientific debate if it forms part of a wider northern Italian dialect continuum.

== History ==
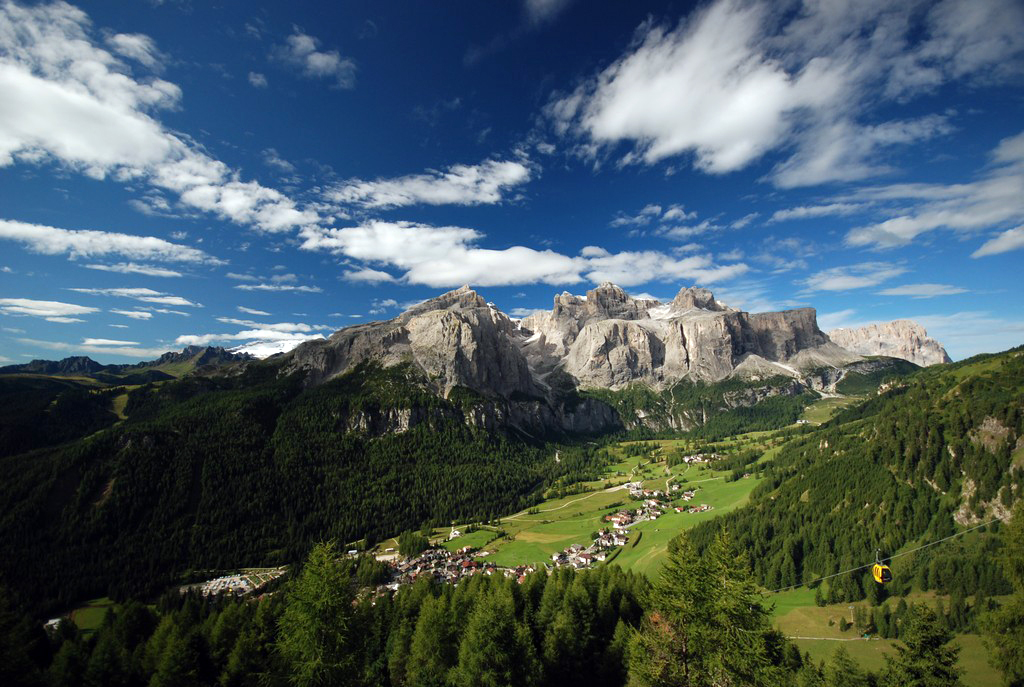
Sella group, view from Calfosch (Corvara)

As a Rhaeto-Romance language, Ladin was part of a large area, which about 1000 AD stretched from Ticino (Tessin) and Grisons in the Swiss Alps to the Julian Alps (in present-day Slovenia) in the east.

The Ladin people developed a national identity during the 19th century, when most of the area—except for the Venetian parts—was incorporated into the Princely County of Tyrol and, as part of the Austrian Empire, underwent a process of Germanisation. The local peasants were called Welsche by Germans (similar to Wenden or Windische for Slavs), while they called themselves "Latin" (Ladin). The Ladin movement was sparked by the Tyrolean Rebellion during the Napoleonic Wars; in 1833, the Ladin language was codified by Micurà de Rü (alias Nikolaus Bacher, 1789–1847), a priest from Badia. A Naziun Ladina association was established in 1870 by several seminarists in Brixen, among them Saint Joseph Freinademetz; followed by the Uniun Ladina, founded in 1905 at Innsbruck, which also maintained relations with Romansh and Friulian organisations.

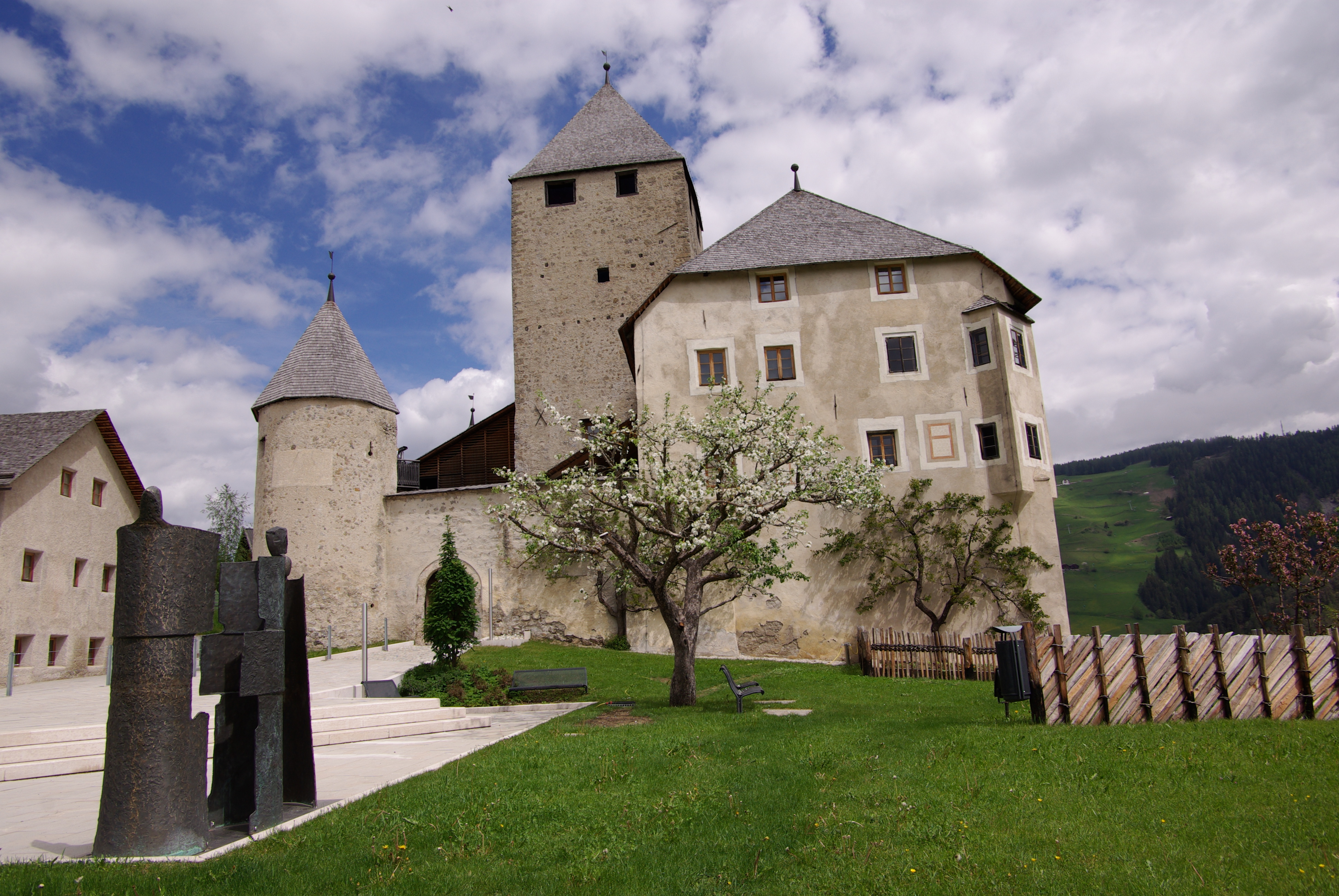
Tor Castle

Ceded to Italy after World War I, the Ladin community, in spite of its high level of identification with the land, did not enjoy any official recognition. On 5 May 1920, representatives from the Ladin valleys met at Gardena Pass to protest against the resolutions of the Treaty of Saint-Germain-en-Laye and to demand their rights of self-determination according to the Fourteen Points outlined by US President Woodrow Wilson. A blue-white-green flag was adopted, symbolising Ladinia's forests, the snow-covered peaks, and the blue sky above. The Ladin movement was suppressed under the Italian Fascist regime, when many Ladin citizens joined the German emigrants under the terms of the 1939 South Tyrol Option Agreement.

After World War II, an Uniun Generela was re-established and the Ladin flag was again occasionally displayed. In 1976, the Istitut Ladin Micurà de Rü was founded at San Martin de Tor for the promotion of the Ladin culture. The Museum Ladin opened in 2001 at nearby Tor Castle.

== Territory ==
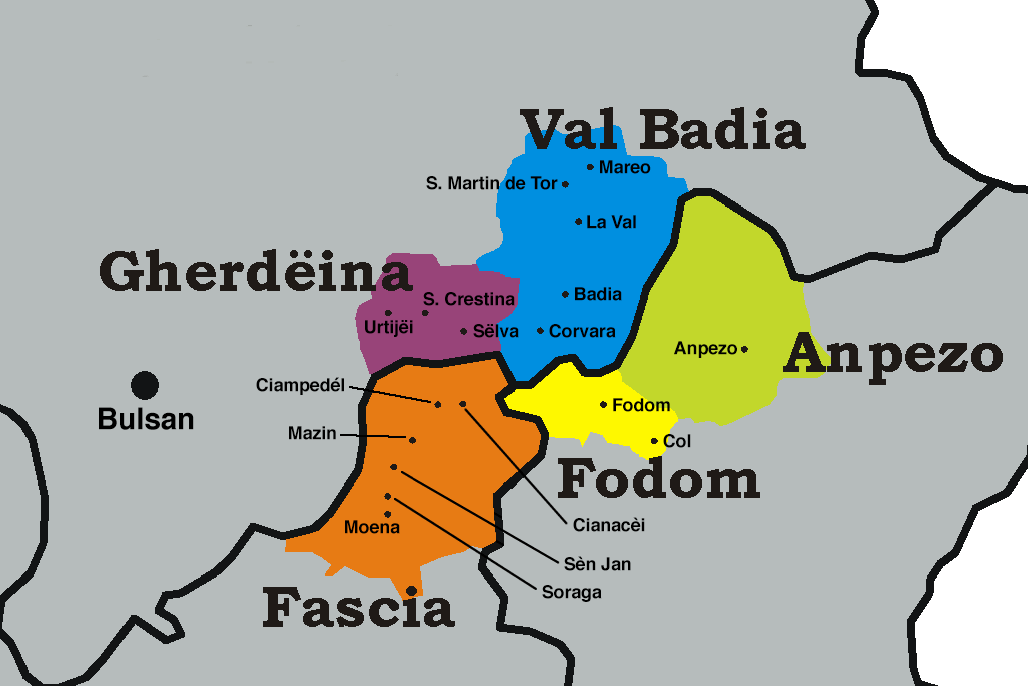
Ladin communities in the core area

The territory occupies approximately 1,200 square kilometers (460 sq. mi), encompassing five valleys in the Dolomite Alps centred around the Sella massif:

- Fascia Valley (Val de Fascia) in Trentino
- Val Gardena (Gherdëina) and Val Badia in South Tyrol
- Livinallongo (Fodom) and Ampezzo (Anpezo) in Veneto.

Other notable peaks in the region include Marmolada at 3,343 m (10,968 ft) and Antelao, the "King of the Dolomites" at 3,263 m (10,705 ft). The main rivers are the Avisio stream, a tributary of the Adige rising from the Marmolada Glacier and running through the Fascia Valley, the Boite in Ampezzo, a tributary of the Piave. Other creeks include the Gran Ega in Val Badia and the Derjon in Val Gardena.

Administratively, Ladinia is divided between two Italian regions, three provinces, and 18 small municipalities:

Ladin name	Italian name	German name	Province	Area (km^{2})	Population
Anpezo	Cortina d’Ampezzo	Hayden	Belluno	255	6,150
Urtijëi	Ortisei	St. Ulrich in Gröden	South Tyrol	24	4,569
Badia	Badia	Abtei	South Tyrol	82	3,237
Mareo	Marebbe	Enneberg	South Tyrol	161	2,684
Moéna	Moena	Moena	Trentino	82	2,628
Sëlva	Selva di Val Gardena	Wolkenstein in Gröden	South Tyrol	53	2,589
Poza	Pozza di Fassa	Potzach im Fassatal	Trentino	73	1,983
Cianacei	Canazei	Kanzenei	Trentino	67	1,844
Santa Cristina Gherdëina	Santa Cristina Valgardena	St. Christina in Gröden	South Tyrol	31	1,840
San Martin de Tor	San Martino in Badia	St. Martin in Thurn	South Tyrol	76	1,727
Fodom	Livinallongo del Col di Lana	Buchenstein	Belluno	99	1,436
Corvara	Corvara	Kurfar	South Tyrol	42	1,266
La Val	La Valle	Wengen	South Tyrol	39	1,251
Vich	Vigo di Fassa	Vig im Fassatal	Trentino	26	1,142
Ciampedèl	Campitello di Fassa	Kampidel im Fassatal	Trentino	25	732
Sorèga	Soraga	Überwasser	Trentino	19	677
Mazin	Mazzin	Mazzin	Trentino	23	440
Col	Colle Santa Lucia	Verseil	Belluno	15	418

Furthermore, the Ladin language is officially recognised in 53 comuni within Belluno, South Tyrol and Trentino.

== See also ==
- Friuli
