= Ladins =

Ethnic group in northern Italy

- Flag of Ladins

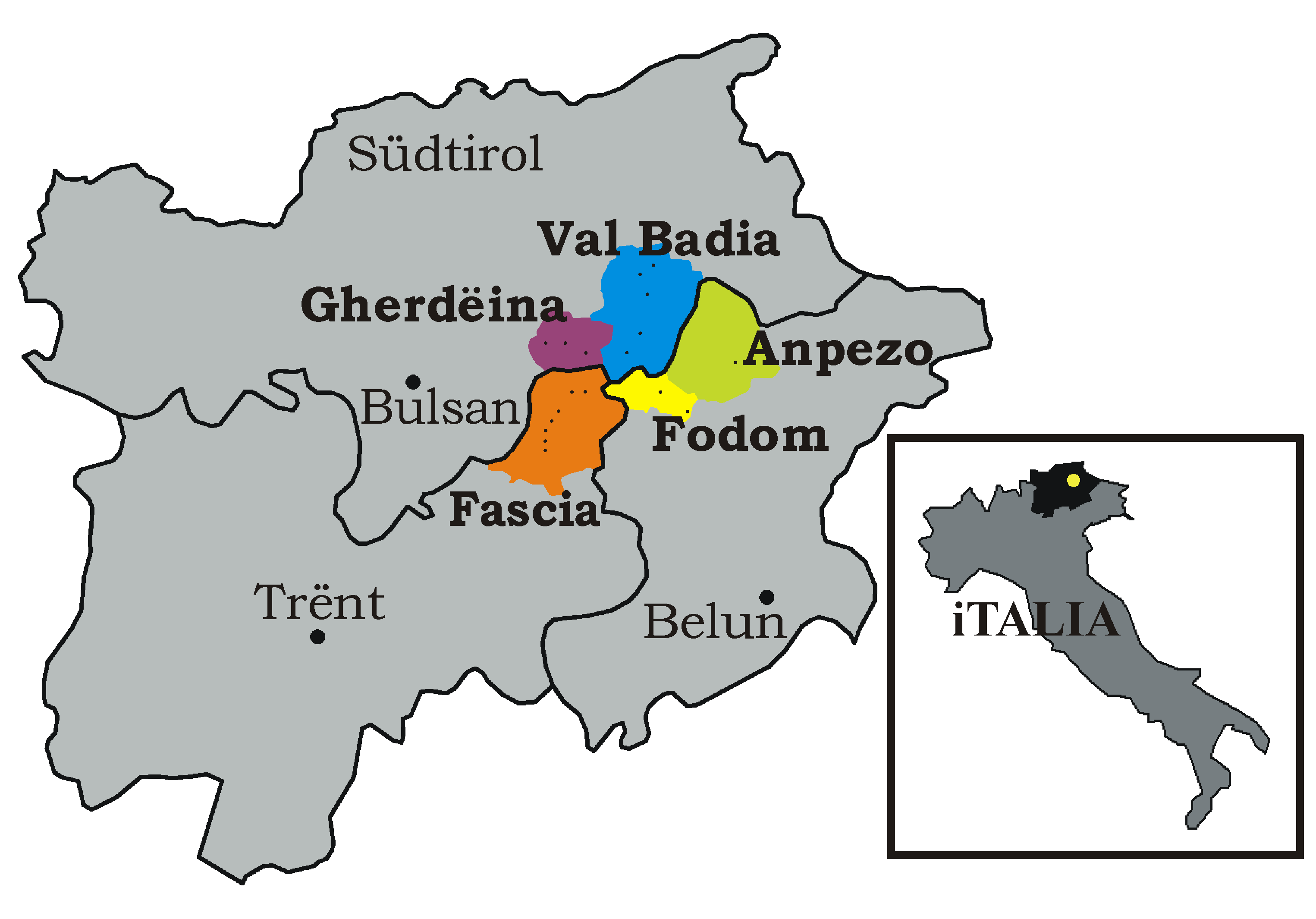
- The Ladin-speaking valleys of Val di Fassa, Val Gardena, Val Badia, Livinallongo and Ampezzo and their locations in northern Italy

Total population
- ≈31,000 (2011, est.)

Regions with significant populations
- Ladinia

Languages
- Ladin, Italian, Austrian German, Venetian

Religion
- Roman Catholicism

Related ethnic groups
- Friulians, Romansh

The Ladins are a Romance ethnolinguistic group of northern Italy. They are distributed in several valleys, collectively known as Ladinia. These valleys include the valleys of Badia and Gherdëina in South Tyrol, of Fassa in Trentino, and of Livinallongo (also known as Buchenstein or Fodom) and Ampezzo in Belluno. Their native language is Ladin, a Rhaeto-Romance language related to the Swiss Romansh and Friulian languages. Ladinia is located in the historical region of Tyrol, and Ladins share that region's culture, history, traditions, environment and architecture.

== History ==
Ladins are thought to be related to Rhaetian people who probably represent the most ancient settlers of the Alps. Around 1000 AD, the Rhaeto-Romance language area was vast, stretching continuously from the Swiss Alps in the west to the Julian Alps in modern-day Slovenia. As Germanic and Slavic populations migrated into the Alps, this large cultural territory was fragmented. Over the centuries, the Ladin people were pushed into high-altitude, isolated mountain valleys, which physically separated them from their linguistic cousins in Switzerland (who speak Romansh) and northeastern Italy (who speak Friulian). Today, the Dolomitic Ladins are one of the last surviving remnants of this once-expansive Alpine population.

Ladins developed a formal national identity in the 19th century. Micurà de Rü undertook the first attempt to develop a written form of the Ladin language. Ladin culture is promoted by the government-sponsored cultural institute Istitut Ladin Micurà de Rü in the South Tyrolean municipality of San Martin de Tor. There is also a Ladin museum in the same municipality. The Ladins of Trentino and Belluno have their own cultural institutes: Majon de Fascegn in Vigo di Fassa, Cesa de Jan in Colle Santa Lucia and Istituto Ladin de la Dolomites in Borca di Cadore.

The Ladin people constitute 4.53% of the population of South Tyrol.

== Communities ==
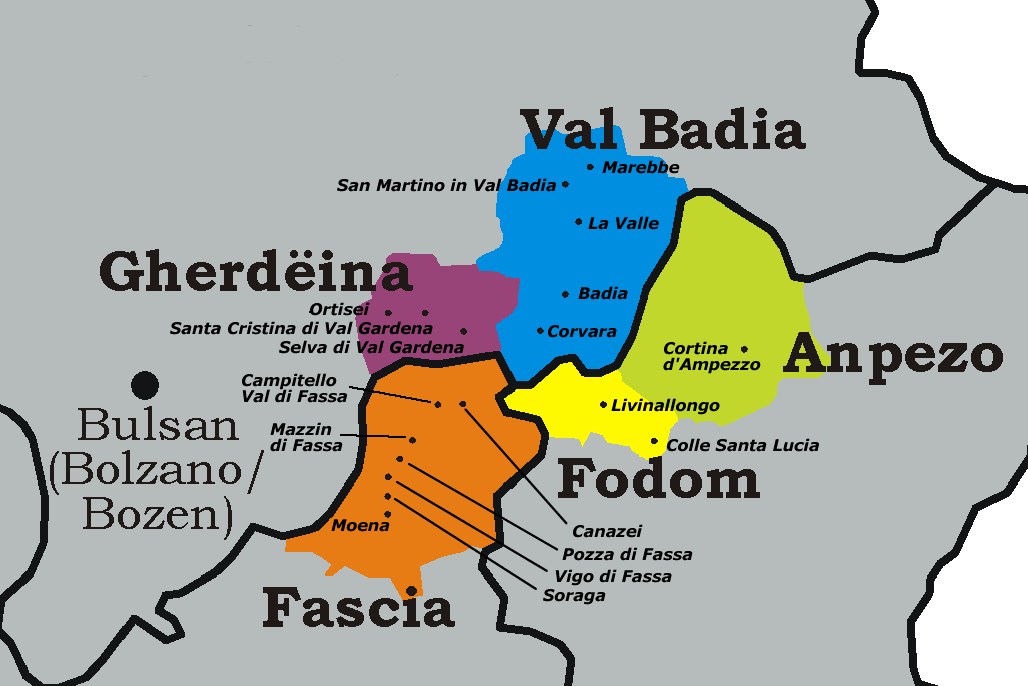
Ladin communities in the core area

Ladin Name	Italian Name	German Name	Province	Area (km^{2})	Population
Anpezo	Cortina d’Ampezzo	Hayden	Belluno	255	6,150
Urtijëi	Ortisei	St. Ulrich in Gröden	South Tyrol	24	4,569
Badia	Badia	Abtei	South Tyrol	82	3,237
Mareo	Marebbe	Enneberg	South Tyrol	161	2,684
Moéna	Moena	Moena	Trentino	82	2,628
Sëlva	Selva di Val Gardena	Wolkenstein in Gröden	South Tyrol	53	2,589
Poza	Pozza di Fassa	Potzach im Fassatal	Trentino	73	1,983
Cianacei	Canazei	Kanzenei	Trentino	67	1,844
Santa Cristina Gherdëina	Santa Cristina Valgardena	St. Christina in Gröden	South Tyrol	31	1,840
San Martin de Tor	San Martino in Badia	St. Martin in Thurn	South Tyrol	76	1,727
Fodom	Livinallongo del Col di Lana	Buchenstein	Belluno	99	1,436
Corvara	Corvara	Kurfar	South Tyrol	42	1,266
La Val	La Valle	Wengen	South Tyrol	39	1,251
Låg	Laghetti	Laag	South Tyrol	23	1,284
Vich	Vigo di Fassa	Vig im Fassatal	Trentino	26	1,142
Ciampedèl	Campitello di Fassa	Kampidel im Fassatal	Trentino	25	732
Sorèga	Soraga	Überwasser	Trentino	19	677
Mazin	Mazzin	Mazzin	Trentino	23	440
Col	Colle Santa Lucia	Verseil	Belluno	15	418

== Gallery ==
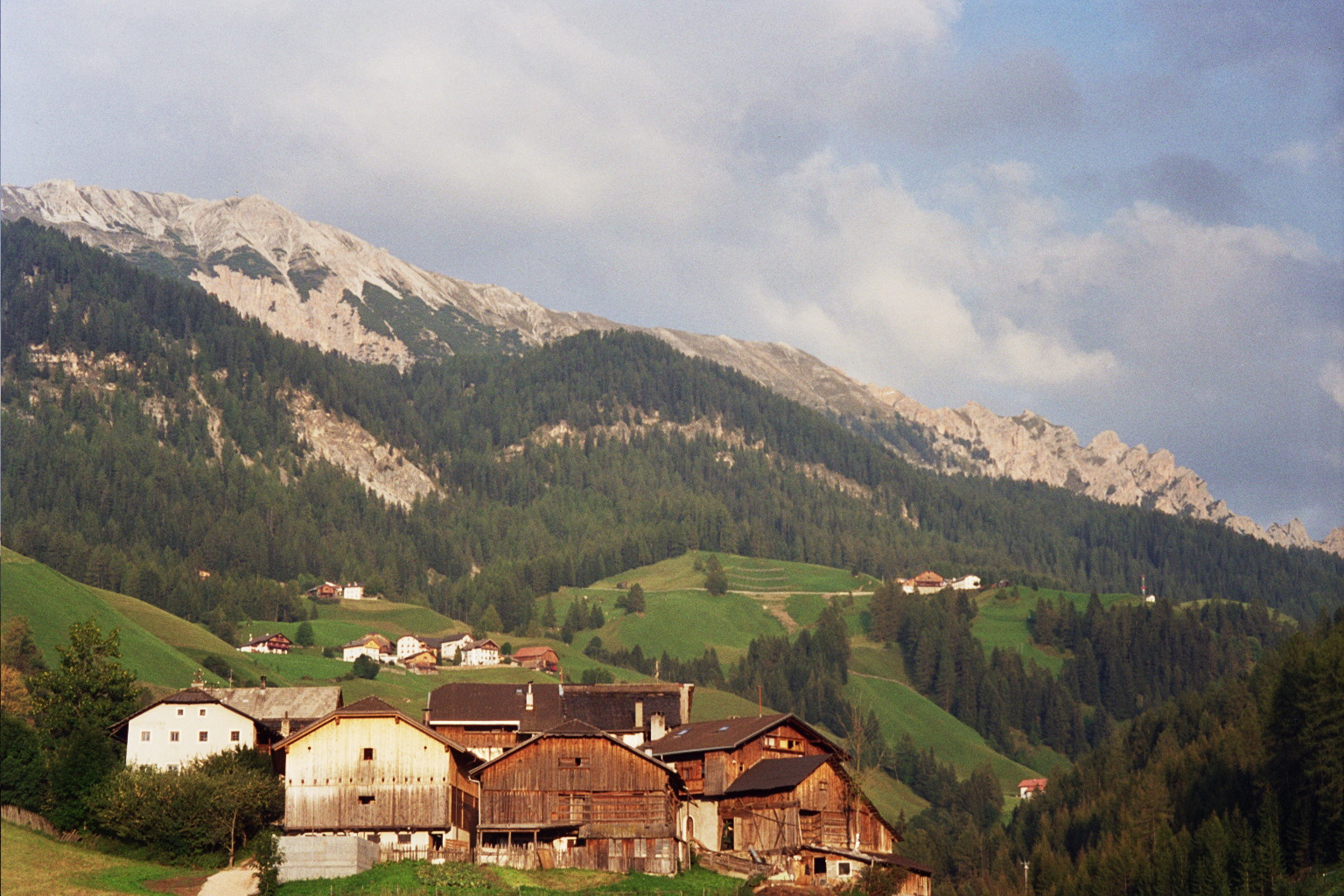
Ladin farms in La Val

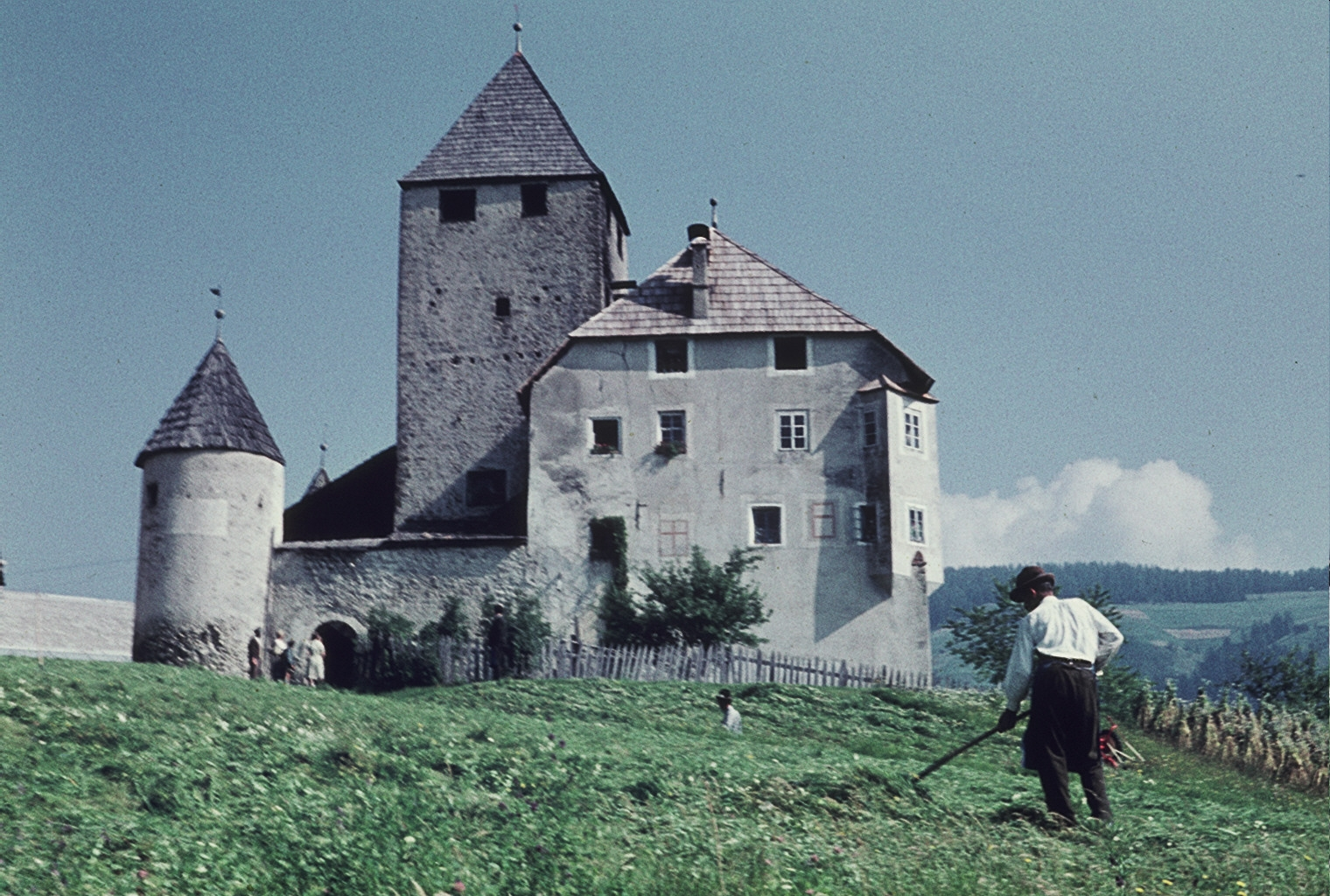
Castle Thurn, San Martin de Tor in the 1960s

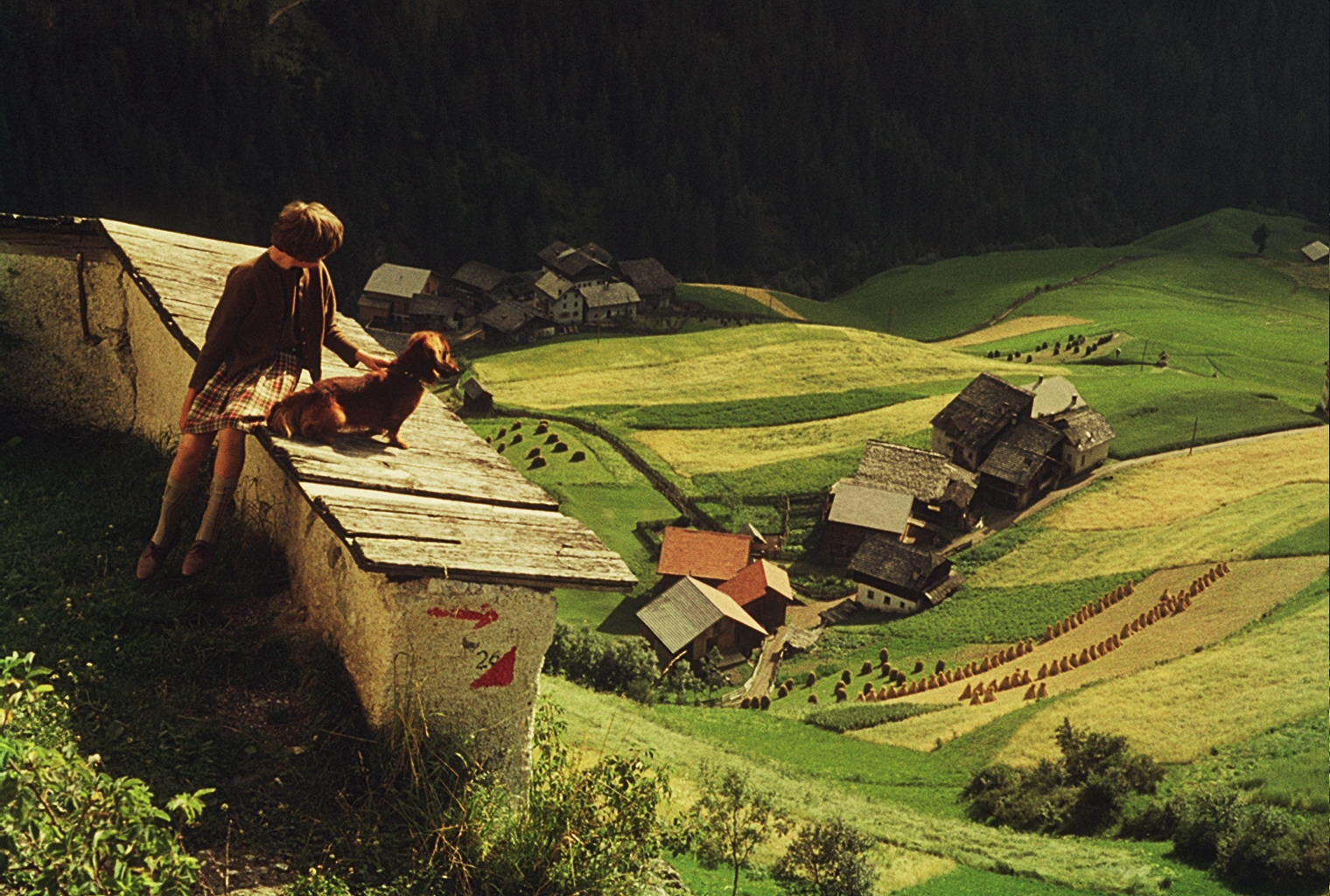
Tavella and Lunz in La Val in the 1960s.

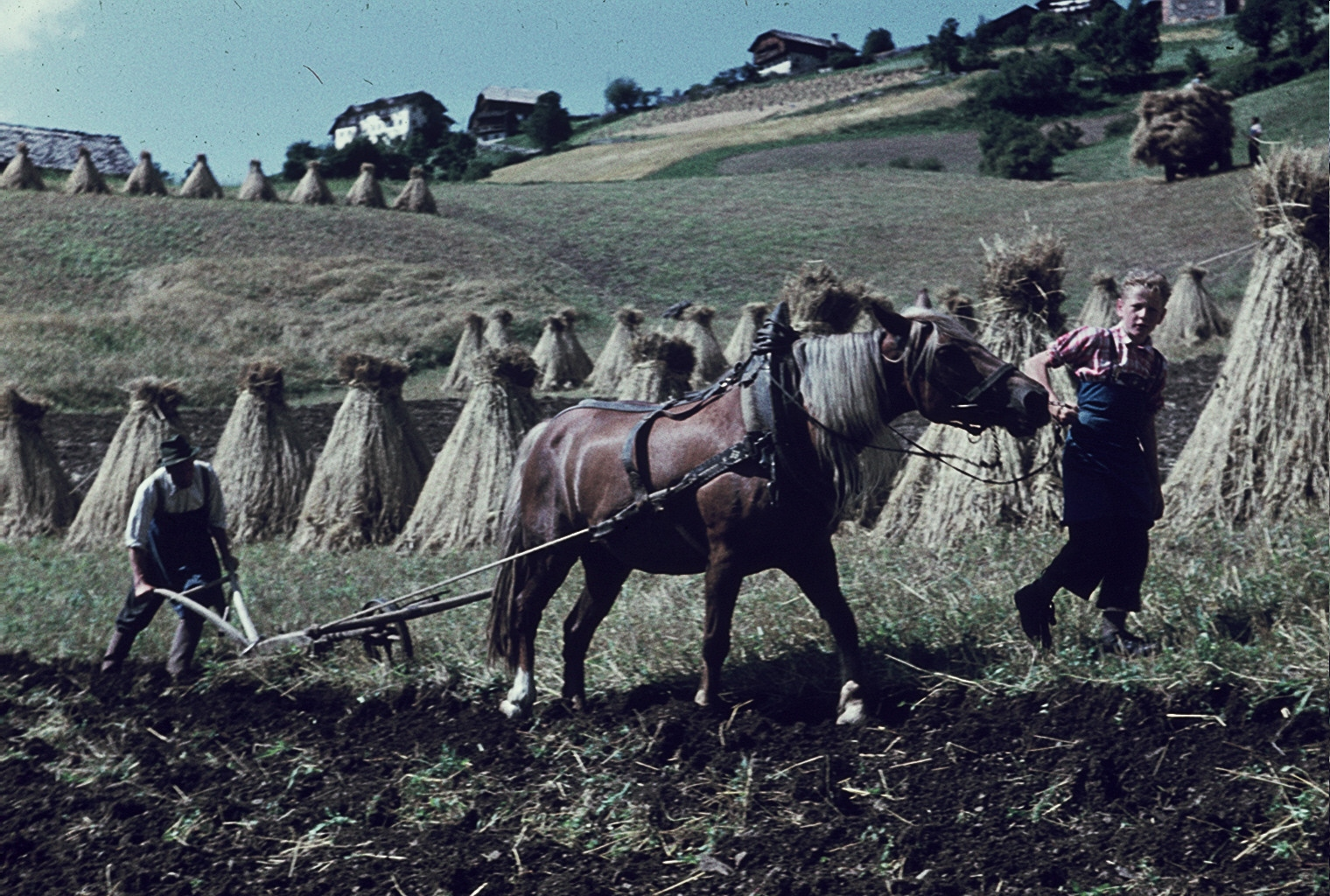
Ploughing in La Val in the 1960s.

== Notable people ==
- Maria Canins, Cyclist (twice winner of the Tour de France Féminin), cross-country skier (15-time national champion) and mountain runner.
- Nadia Delago, professional alpine skier, 2022 Olympic bronze medalist.
- Nicol Delago, professional alpine skier
- Giorgio Moroder, singer, songwriter, DJ and record producer
- Ettore Sottsass, photographer, architect and designer
- Carolina Kostner, figure skater, 2014 Olympic bronze medalist, 2012 World champion, and five-time European champion.
- Simon Kostner, ice hockey player, represented the Italian national team in several tournaments.
- Erwin Kostner, ice hockey player, competed in the men's tournament at the 1984 Winter Olympics.
- Kristian Ghedina, World Cup alpine ski racer whose thirteen victories are the most by an Italian downhill specialist in World Cup history.
- Simona Senoner, cross-country racer and ski jumper
- Peter Runggaldier, professional Alpine skier

== See also ==
- The Ladinian, a stage/age of the Triassic period named for the Ladin people
- Nones dialect
- Raeti
- Rhaeto-Romance
