= Alta Badia =

Ski resort in Italy

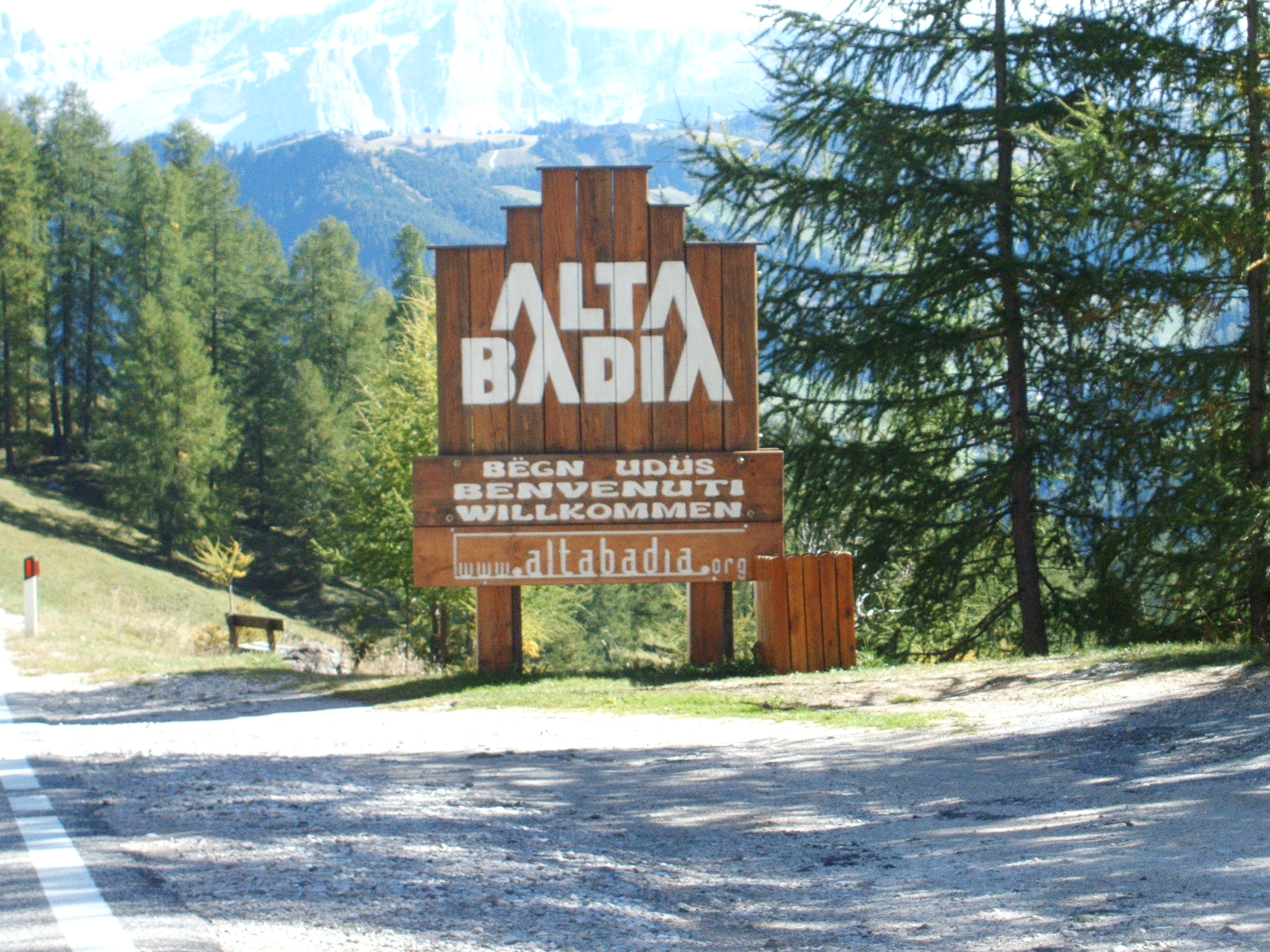
- West entrance above Calfosch and Corvara

- Location in the Alps
- Nearest major city: Bolzano, Trento
- Coordinates: 46.553°N 11.874°E
- Vertical: 1,226 m (4,022 ft)
- Top elevation: 2,550 m (8,366 ft) (Sella)
- Base elevation: 1,324 m (4,344 ft) (Pedraces)
- Skiable area: 130 km (80 mi)
- Trails: 130km total; 70km (54%) easy; 52km (40%) intermediate; 8km (6%) difficult
- Longest run: 8.5 km (5.3 mi)
- Lift system: 51 total; 1 funicular; 1 aerial tramways; 10 gondolas; 30 chair lifts; 11 surface lifts
- Lift capacity: 78,100 /hr
- Snowmaking: 80-90% of all runs

Alta Badia is a ski resort in the Dolomites of northern Italy, in the upper part of the Val Badia (German: Hochabtei) in South Tyrol. It is part of the Dolomiti Superski ski area. It is included in the territories of the municipalities of Corvara, Badia, and La Val. Centered on Corvara, the extended area's lift-served summit elevation is 2,550 m (8,366 ft) on the Sella group, with an overall vertical drop of 1,226 m (4,022 ft) to Pedraces. The native language of the majority of the locals is Ladin.

== Alpine Skiing World Cup ==
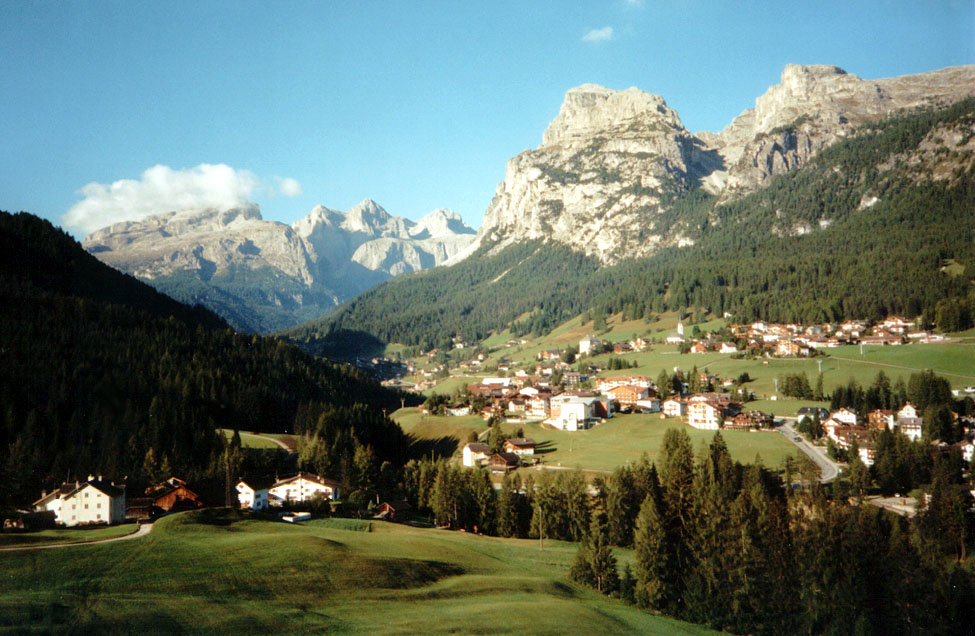
Looking southwest from La Ila toward Corvara, Sella group at left center (in distance), and Sassongher (2,665 m (8,740 ft)) at right center

Alta Badia is a regular stop on the World Cup schedule, usually by the men in mid-December. Its giant slalom course, the classic Gran Risa, is one of the most challenging on the circuit. In December 2012, the course had a vertical drop of 448 m (1,470 ft), starting at 1,871 m (6,140 ft) and finishing at 1,423 m (4,670 ft), near La Ila (La Villa) (46.576°N 11.9°E). The race was won by Ted Ligety of the U.S., who also won two years earlier.

Nearby World Cup venues are Val Gardena to the west (over Gardena Pass) and Cortina d'Ampezzo (over Valparola Pass) to the east.
