= List of natural luge tracks =

Natural luge tracks are tracks that are used for naturbahn (from the German "natural track") luge competitions. Tracks are often located along mountain roads and paths. The track surface is made of packed snow and ice, with a slope of not more than 15%. Unlike its Olympic counterpart "kunstbahn" (artificial track) luge, natural tracks are to be adapted to the natural conditions. Artificial refrigeration and banked curves are not permitted.

Natural tracks are partly built on existing paths, but also on specially created areas and must of course be adapted to the given terrain. They are delimited with wooden bands, plastic walls or foam mats and only prepared with snow and water (ice). The lanes must have a minimum width of 3 m (10 ft) and the curves must have a minimum radius of seven meters. The usual lengths of these natural tracks are between 400 and 1,200 m (1,300 and 3,900 ft), they must not exceed an average gradient of 13% and a maximum gradient of 25%.

In contrast to the artificial tracks, the cross-section of natural tracks is level - not banked in curves. This type of track leads to significantly more body movement by the athlete to navigate the turns, and the use of braking spikes on the athlete's shoes for control.

The natural track should have at least the following elements:

- a left turn
- a right turn
- a hairpin (left and right)
- a combination of curves
- a straight

Parallel competitions (approximately 300 m, 1,000 ft), chase races (300 to 600 m, 1,000 to 2,000 ft) and city races (approximately 400 m, 1,300 ft) are held on shortened tracks. From the 2015–16 season there are trial runs (city event in Moscow, Junior World Cup Seiseralm) and parallel competitions in ski areas (for example in Kühtai / Tyrol and on the Seiseralm / Italy). Artificially excessive curves are not permitted: the curve base is to be horizontal.

More than 50 natural toboggan runs are mainly used in Italy, Austria, and Germany. In addition there are runs in Russia, Poland, Romania, Bulgaria, Finland, Sweden, Norway, the Czech Republic, Turkey, Croatia, New Zealand, Slovenia, Ukraine, Slovakia, Switzerland, France, and Liechtenstein as well as Canada and the United States.

The most well-known natural track in the United States is in Michigan, hosted by the Upper Peninsula Luge Club. Canada has tracks in Hinton, Grande Prairie, and Calgary in Alberta, as well as a track at the Ontario Luge Club at the Calabogie Peaks resort. The track in Naseby, New Zealand, is the only one in the Southern Hemisphere.

Below is a list of all natural luge tracks of FIL member countries.

Track	Country	Length (m)	Vertical Drop (m)	Average Grade (%)	Number of curves	Reference(s)
Aflenz	Austria	1040	136	13.9	17	
Albertville	France					
Aosta Valle del Gran San Bernardo	Italy					
Aurach	Austria	1080	157	14.7	11	
Avers	Switzerland					
Brigels	Switzerland					
Bruneck-Reischach	Italy					
Calgary	Canada					
Canale d'Agordo	Italy					
Davos	Switzerland					[iscd-davos.ch/]
Delnice	Croatia	417				
Deutschnofen	Italy	871	121	13	Not listed	
Dolenja Vas	Slovenia	1102	151	13.5	19	
Dornbirn	Austria	830	72	14	14	
Feld am See	Austria	1080	170	15.74	Not listed	
Fenis	Italy					
Frankenfels	Austria	1197	177	14.8	15	
Frantschach	Austria	Not listed	Not listed	Not listed	21	
Gais-Uttenheim	Italy	1200	128	10.67	Not listed	
Garmisch-Partenkirchen	Germany	1100	153	13.9	17	
Gołdap	Poland					
Grande Prairie	Canada	980	125	12.7	14	
Grindelwald	Switzerland					
Gsies	Italy					
Hinton	Canada					
Gummer	Italy					
Hüttau	Austria	893	121	13.5	18	,
Hol	Norway					
Jesenice	Slovenia					[www.sazs.si/]
Kindberg	Austria	950	126	13.22	12	,
Kreuth	Germany	1400	190	13.6	Not listed	
Krynica-Zdrój	Poland	727	95.8	13	14	
Kühtai-Tirol	Austria	Parallel-Strecke				temporäre Strecke
Laas	Italy					
Längenfeld-Sölden	Austria					
Latsch	Italy	1200	118	10.17	15	,
Latzfons / Klausen	Italy	Not listed	Not listed	Not listed	16	
Lendak	Slovakia					
Lidingö	Sweden					
Lungiarü / Campill	Italy	1147	132	11.6	26	
Lüsen	Italy	1050	104	9.9	21	
Mölten	Italy					
Montreux	Switzerland					
Moos in Passeier	Italy	870	114.75	13.19	9	, ,
Moscow	Russia	500	65	13	9	
Muskegon	United States	259	15.5	6 (banked curves are not permitted in FIL natural luge track)	6	
Naseby	New Zealand	360			7	
Navis	Austria	762	115	14	19	
Negaunee	United States	696	88	12.6	23	
Novouralsk/Ekaterinenburg	Russia	850	109	13	15	
Oberperfuss	Austria	1200	160	13.45	28	
Ontario Calabogie luge club	Canada					
Olang	Italy	1008.5	117.68	11.77	12	,
Oslo	Norway					
Platt./ Pass	Italy					
Rautavaara (1989-2013)	Finland					
Sarikamis Kars	Turkey					
Reischach	Italy					
Seiseralm-Völs	Italy					
Stange	Italy	1081.70	150	12.83	16	,
Stein an der Enns	Austria	1040	15	13.8	20	
St. Lorenzen	Italy					
St. Walburg	Italy	1213	142	11.68	7	,
Szczyrk	Poland	960	145	12.88	Not listed	
Telfes	Austria					
Tiers	Italy					
Toblach	Italy					
Triesenberg	Liechtenstein	300	38.65	13	Not listed	
Umhausen	Austria	1000	120	12.1	12	
Unterammergau	Germany	1100	165	15	14	,
Uttenheim	Italy					
Villach	Austria					
Villanders	Italy	Not listed	Not listed	Not listed	19	
Virgen	Austria	1600	210	13.2	Not listed	
Vögelsberg	Austria	920	130	13	12	
Völs - Tuffalm	Italy					
Völs - Gschlieder Kanzel	Italy	223	38	17	6	
Winterleiten-Obdach	Austria					
Železniki	Slovenia	843	101	13	16	,
