= Micurà de Rü =

Austrian presbyter and author (1789–1847)

Micurà de Rü, born Nikolaus Bacher (San Cassiano, Badia, December 4, 1789 – Wilten, March 29, 1847), was an Austrian Ladin-speaking Catholic presbyter and linguist best known for his writings on the Ladin language.

== Biography ==
He was born as Nikolaus Bacher in vila Rü in San Ćiascian, now part of Badia, South Tyrol.

Coming from a Ladin family, the last of four children, he studied theology and was ordinated as a priest in Salzburg on August 28, 1814. He was a military chaplain and teacher in the Scuola Militare in Milan. He was also a lecturer of Italian in the University of Innsbruck.

Strongly connected to his origins, he wrote, in 1833, the first grammar book of the Ladin language, Versuch einer deütsch-ladinischen Sprachlehre ("An attempt at compiling a German-Ladin Grammar"), written with an intention to unify the different dialects of the Valleys of South Tyrol. He signed his name as "Micurà de Rü", "Micurà" being the Ladin pronunciation of Nikolaus or Nicolò, and Rü being his birthplace.

The Istitut Ladin Micurà de Rü, the institute founded in 1976 in San Martin de Tor for the study, cultivation, and promotion of the Ladin language, history and culture is named after him.
