= Sass da Ciampac =

Mountain in Italy

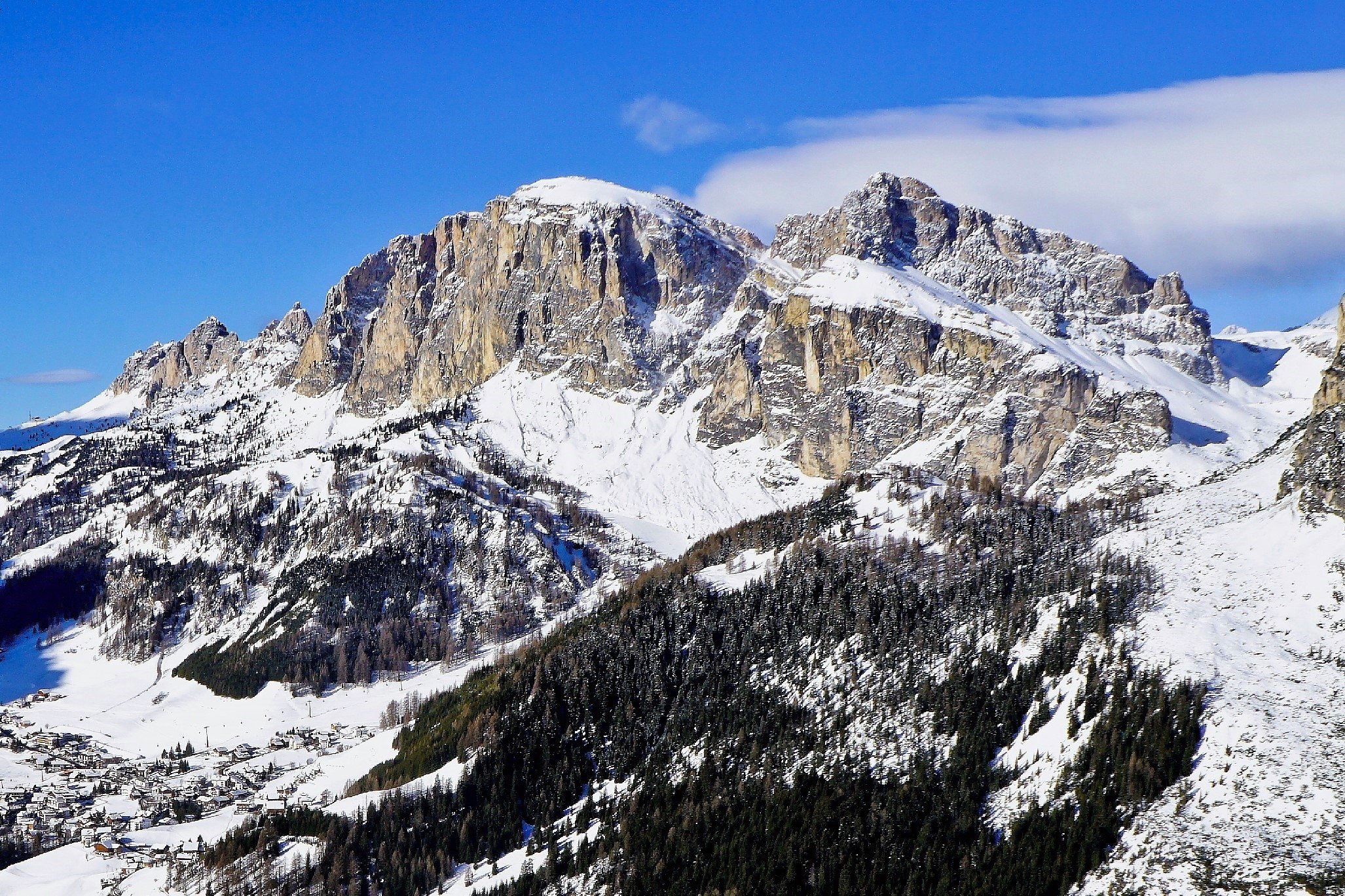
- Southeast aspect

Highest point
- Elevation: 2,672 m (8,766 ft)
- Prominence: 304 m (997 ft)
- Parent peak: Furchëta
- Isolation: 3.38 km (2.10 mi)
- Coordinates: 46°33′47″N 11°50′07″E

Geography
- Location within Italy
- Country: Italy
- Province: South Tyrol
- Protected area: Puez-Geisler Nature Park
- Parent range: Dolomites; Puez Group
- Topo map: Tabacco Map 05 Val Gardena / Alpe di Siusi

Geology
- Rock age: Triassic
- Rock type: Dolomite

Climbing
- First ascent: 1903
- Easiest route: Trail

Sass da Ciampac is a mountain in the province of South Tyrol in northern Italy.

== Description ==
Sass da Ciampac, labeled as Sass di Campaccio on the official IGM map, is a 2,672-meter-elevation (8,766-foot) summit in the Puez Group of the Dolomites, a UNESCO World Heritage Site. Set in the Trentino-Alto Adige/Südtirol region, the peak is located two kilometers (1.24 miles) northwest of the village of Calfosch, and the peak is set in Puez-Geisler Nature Park. Precipitation runoff from the mountain's north slope drains into a tributary of the Derjon, whereas the south slope drains into a tributary of the Gran Ega. Topographic relief is significant as the south slopes rises 970 meters (3,182 feet) in 1.8 kilometers (1.12 miles). The first ascent via the south face was made on August 21, 1903, by Josef Adang, Franz Pospischil, and Josef Nagler. The nearest higher neighbor is Pitla Piza de Puez, 3.38 kilometers (2.1 miles) to the north-northwest.

== Climate ==
Based on the Köppen climate classification, Sass da Ciampac is located in an alpine climate zone with long, cold winters, and short, mild summers. Weather systems are forced upwards by the mountains (orographic lift), causing moisture to drop in the form of rain and snow. The months of June through September offer the most favorable weather for visiting or climbing in this area.

== Gallery ==
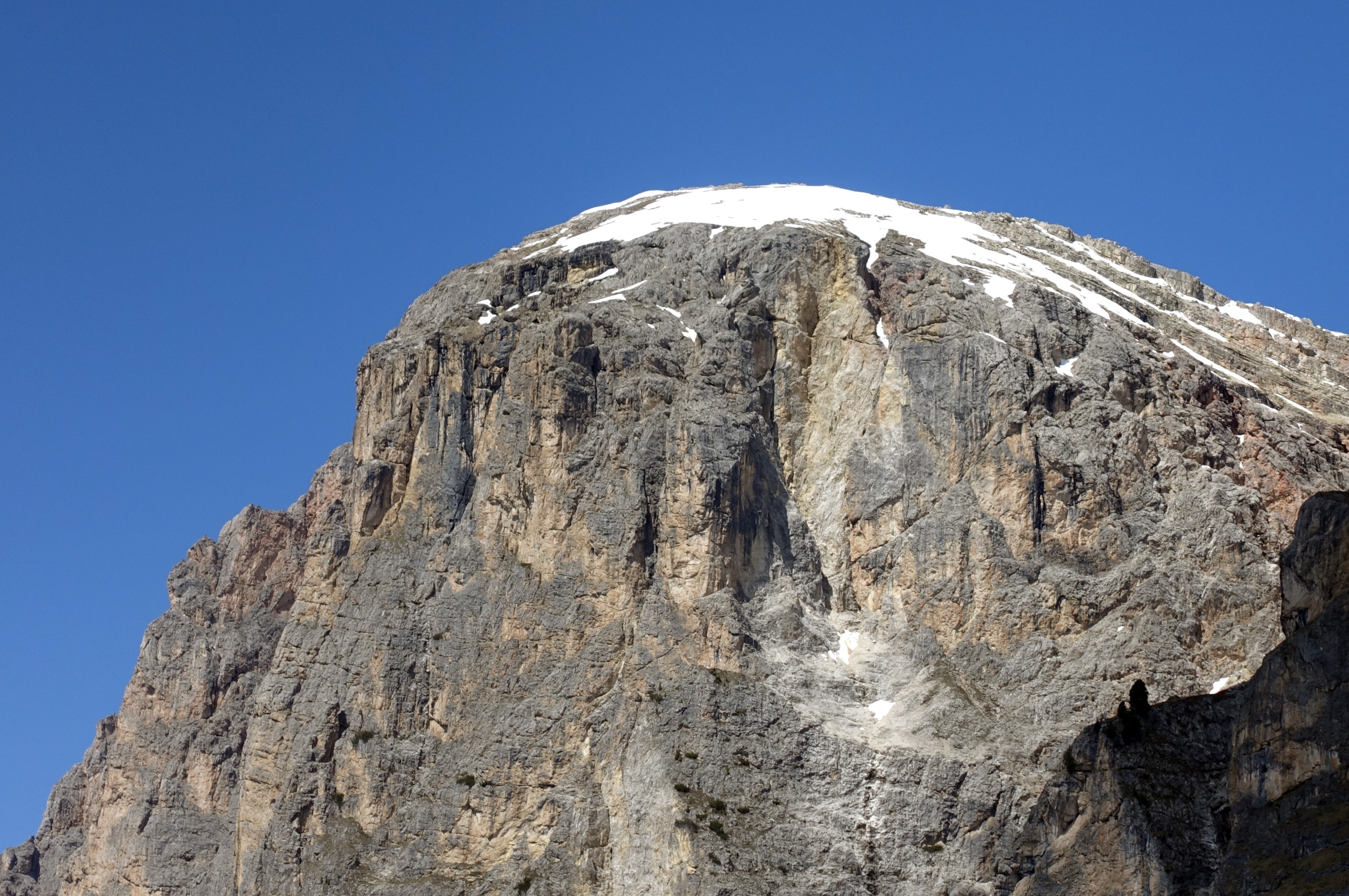

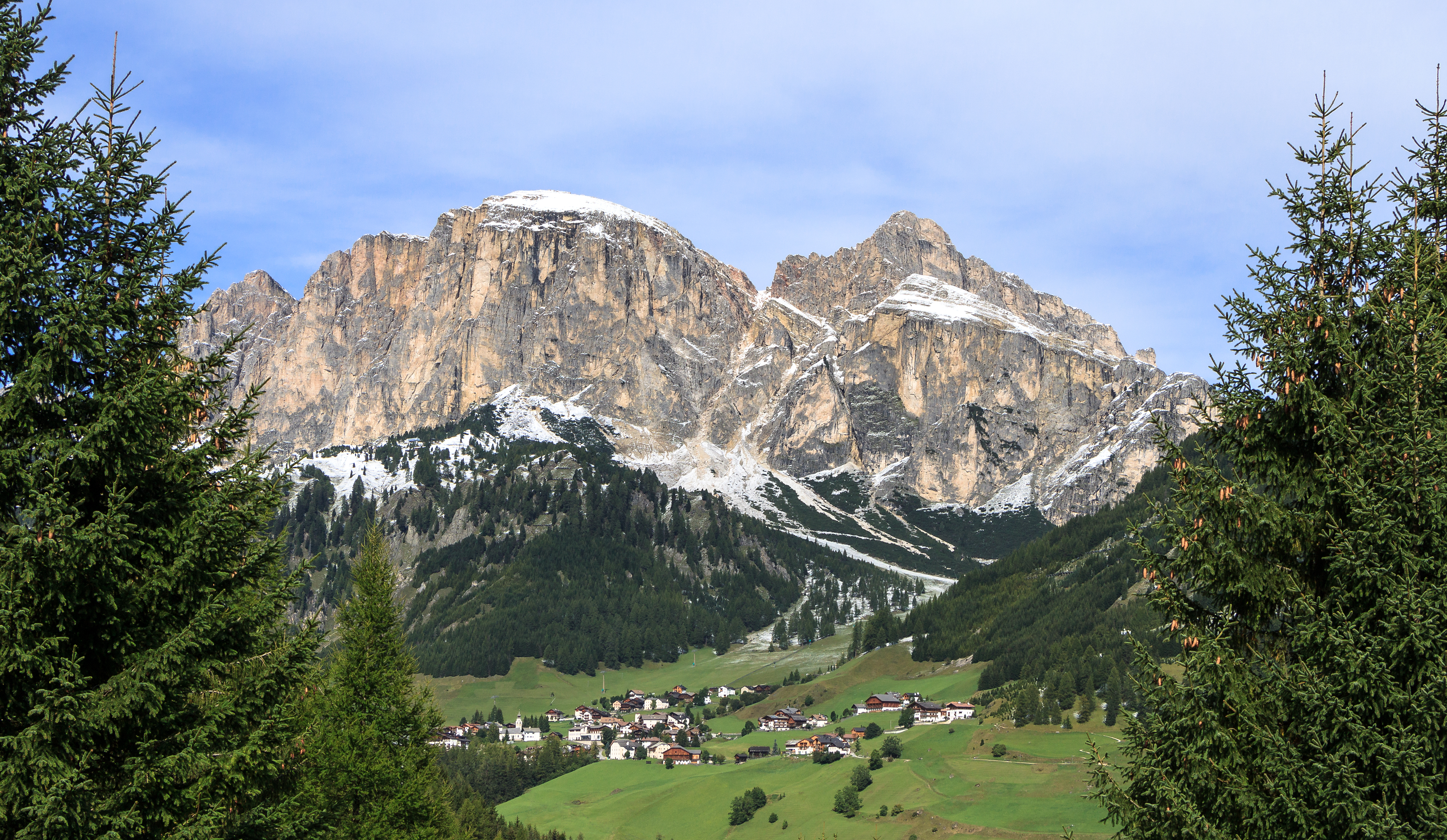

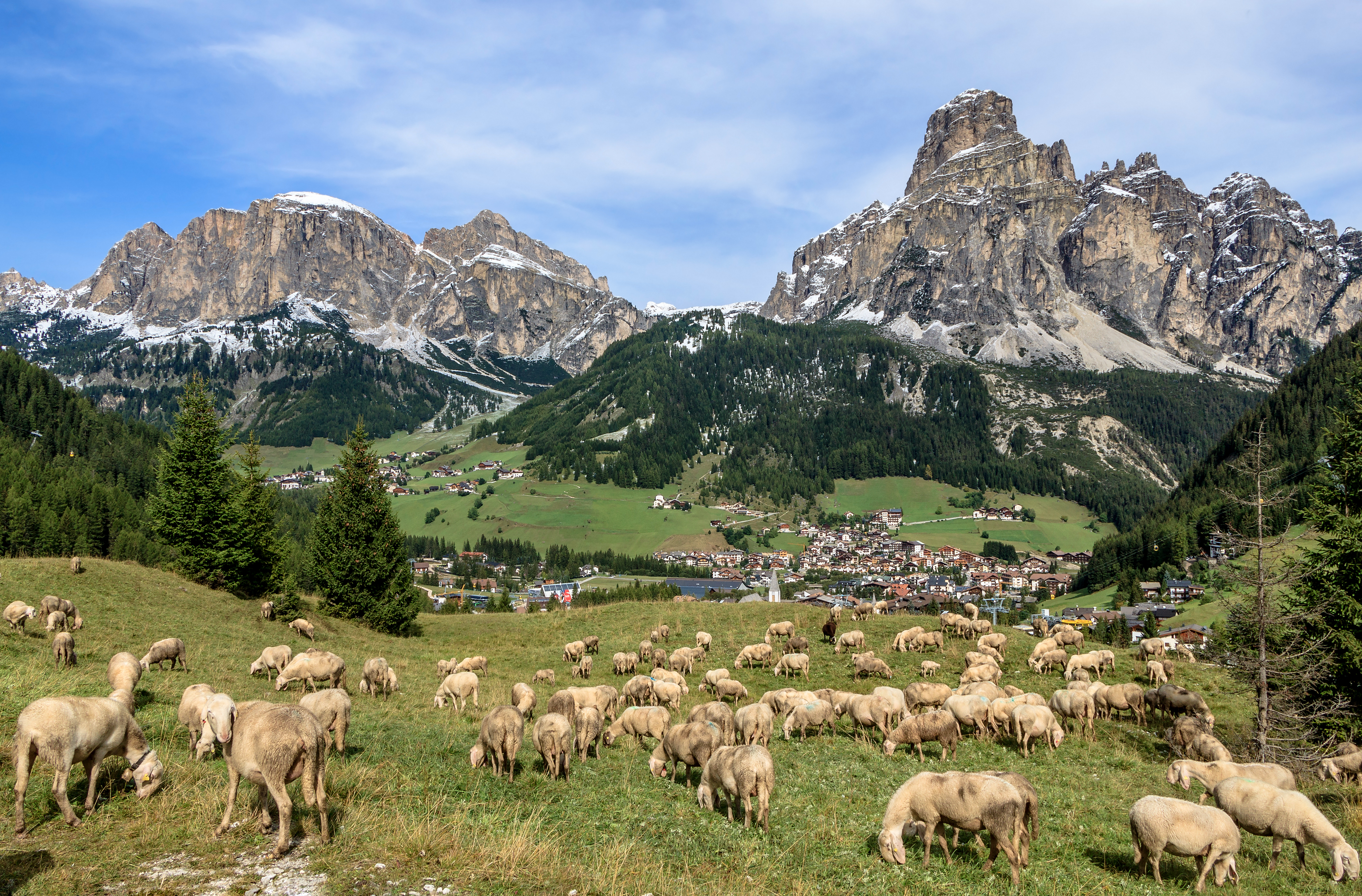
Sass da Ciampac (left) and Sassongher (right)

== See also ==
- Southern Limestone Alps
