= Laag (disambiguation) =

Laag is commonly used for a South Tyrolean, Italian Frazione. It may also refer to:

- Laag (TV series) – a Pakistani drama.
- Låg – a Germanic adjective and last name (e.g., Jul Låg and David Låg Tomasi)
- Liwa Assad Allah al-Ghalib fi al-Iraq wa al-Sham, often shortened to LAAG – a Shia Muslim militant group involved in the Syrian Civil War and Iraqi Civil War (2014–2017)
