= Flag of Ladins =

- Use: Ethnic flag
- Adopted: 5 May 1920
- Design: A horizontal tricolour of blue, white, and green.
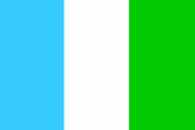
- Use: alternative version

The flag of Ladins is horizontal tricolour of blue, white, and green. The Ladin people are an ethnic group in northern Italy. In 2024, the Regional Council of Trentino-Alto Adige/Südtirol recognized the flag, allowing it to be officially displayed in municipalities next to the Italian tricolour.

== Overview ==
The flag symbolizes the landscape: blue for the sky, white for the mountains and green for the meadows. The flag was introduced in 1920 during the Ladin Congress. It is unclear whether the flag was allowed during the time of Italian fascism. There are some which have also symbols or even coats of arms of Ladin families or municipalities, but these are only created by irrelevant people or organizations, no official institutions. Examples for symbols based on the flag are the coat of arms of Canazei or the logo of the Ladin Autonomist Union. The vertical version is less popular, but widespread especially outside of South Tyrol.
