= Sassongher =

Mountain in Italy

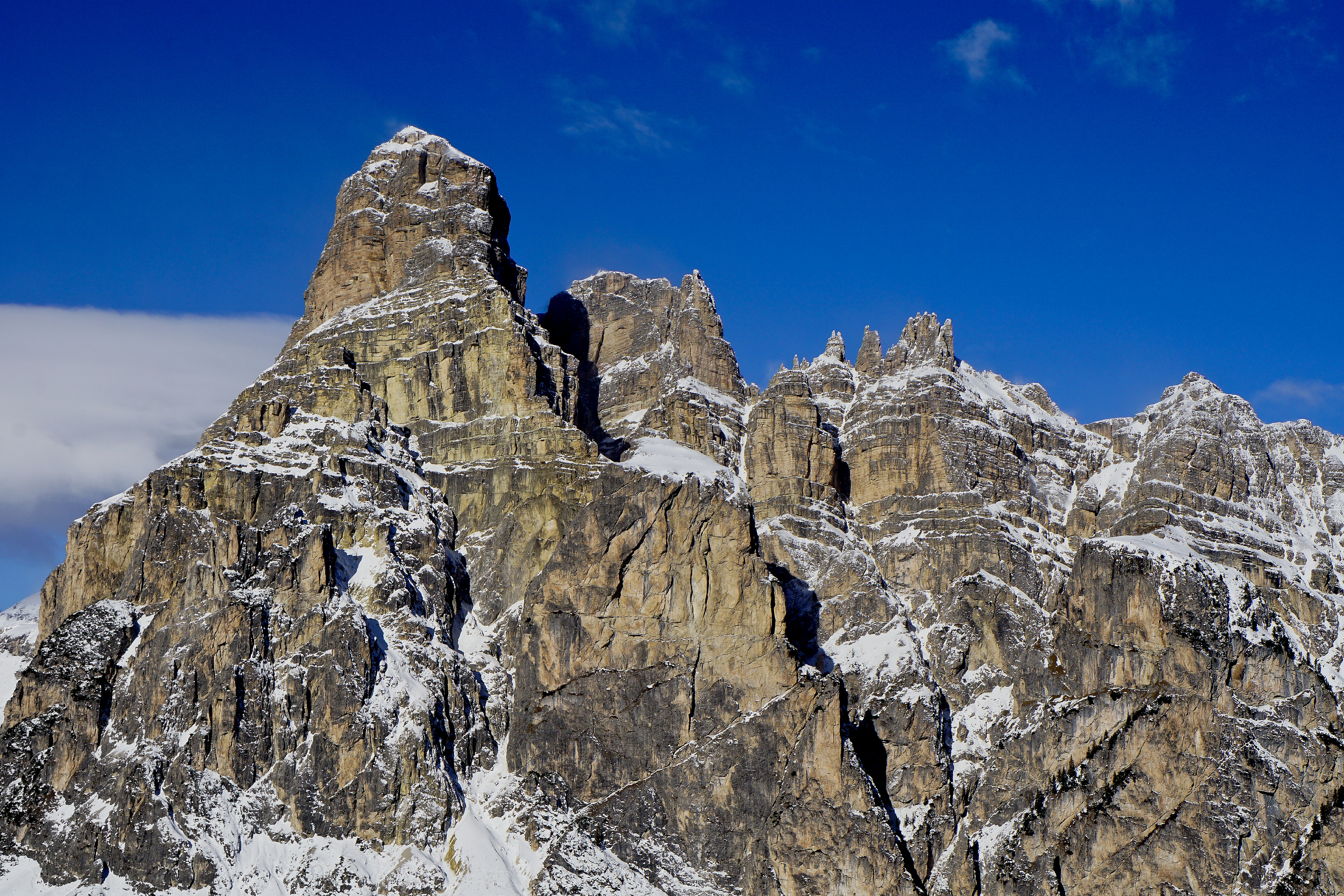
- Southeast aspect

Highest point
- Elevation: 2,665 m (8,743 ft)
- Prominence: 257 m (843 ft)
- Parent peak: Furchëta
- Isolation: 2.25 km (1.40 mi)
- Coordinates: 46°34′05″N 11°51′50″E

Geography
- Location within Italy
- Country: Italy
- Province: South Tyrol
- Protected area: Puez-Geisler Nature Park
- Parent range: Dolomites; Puez Group
- Topo map(s): Tabacco Map 05 Val Gardena / Gröden, Alpe di Siusi / Seiseralm

Geology
- Rock age: Triassic
- Rock type: Dolomite

Climbing
- First ascent: 1900

Sassongher is a mountain in the province of South Tyrol in northern Italy.

== Description ==
Sassongher is a 2,665-meter-elevation (8,743-foot) summit in the Puez Group of the Dolomites, a UNESCO World Heritage Site. Set in the Trentino-Alto Adige/Südtirol region, the peak is located two kilometers (1.24 miles) north-northwest of the village of Corvara, and the peak is set in Puez-Geisler Nature Park. Precipitation runoff from the mountain's slopes drains into tributaries of the Gran Ega. Topographic relief is significant as the summit rises 1,165 meters (3,822 feet) above the Gran Ega in two kilometers (1.24 miles). The first ascent of the summit was made in 1900 by Joseph Kostner. The mountain's toponym translates from Ladin language wherein "Sass" means rock or stone, and "ongher" is believed to mean long or big. The nearest higher neighbor is Sass da Ciampac, 2.25 kilometers (1.4 miles) to the west.

== Climate ==
Based on the Köppen climate classification, Sassongher is located in an alpine climate zone with long, cold winters, and short, mild summers. Weather systems are forced upwards by the mountains (orographic lift), causing moisture to drop in the form of rain and snow. The months of June through September offer the most favorable weather for visiting or climbing in this area.

== Gallery ==
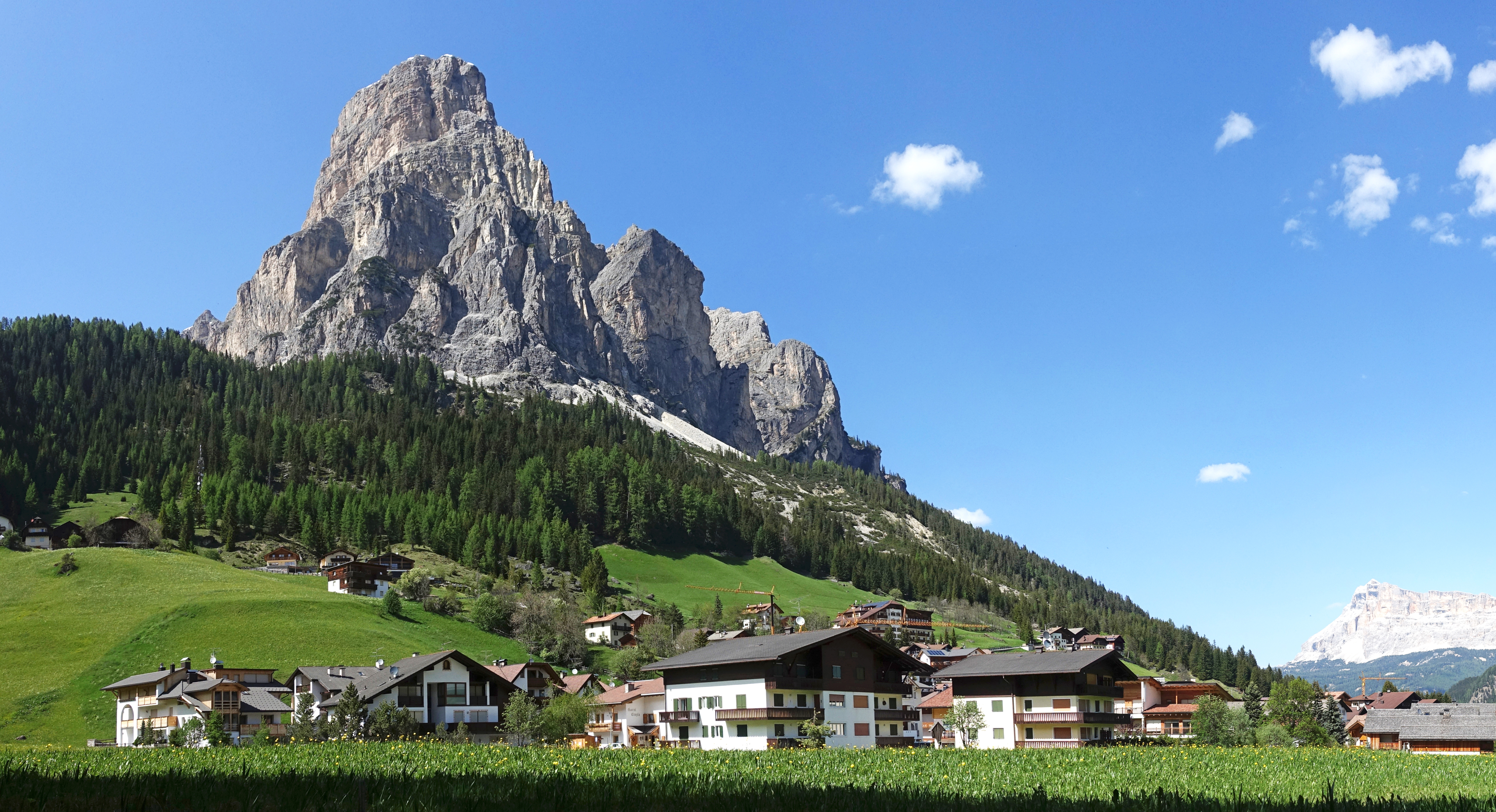
Sassongher rises above Corvara

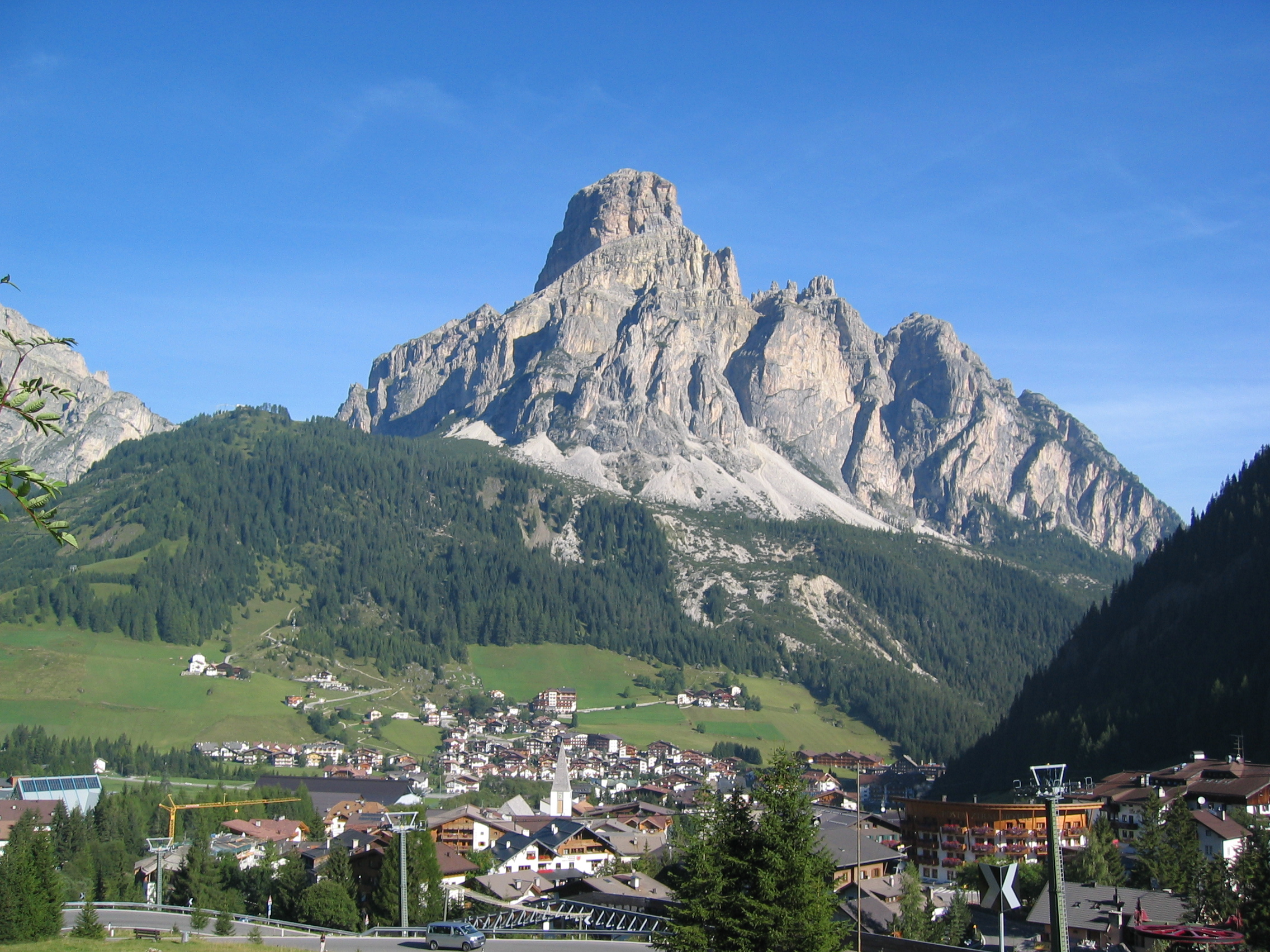
Sassongher rises above Corvara

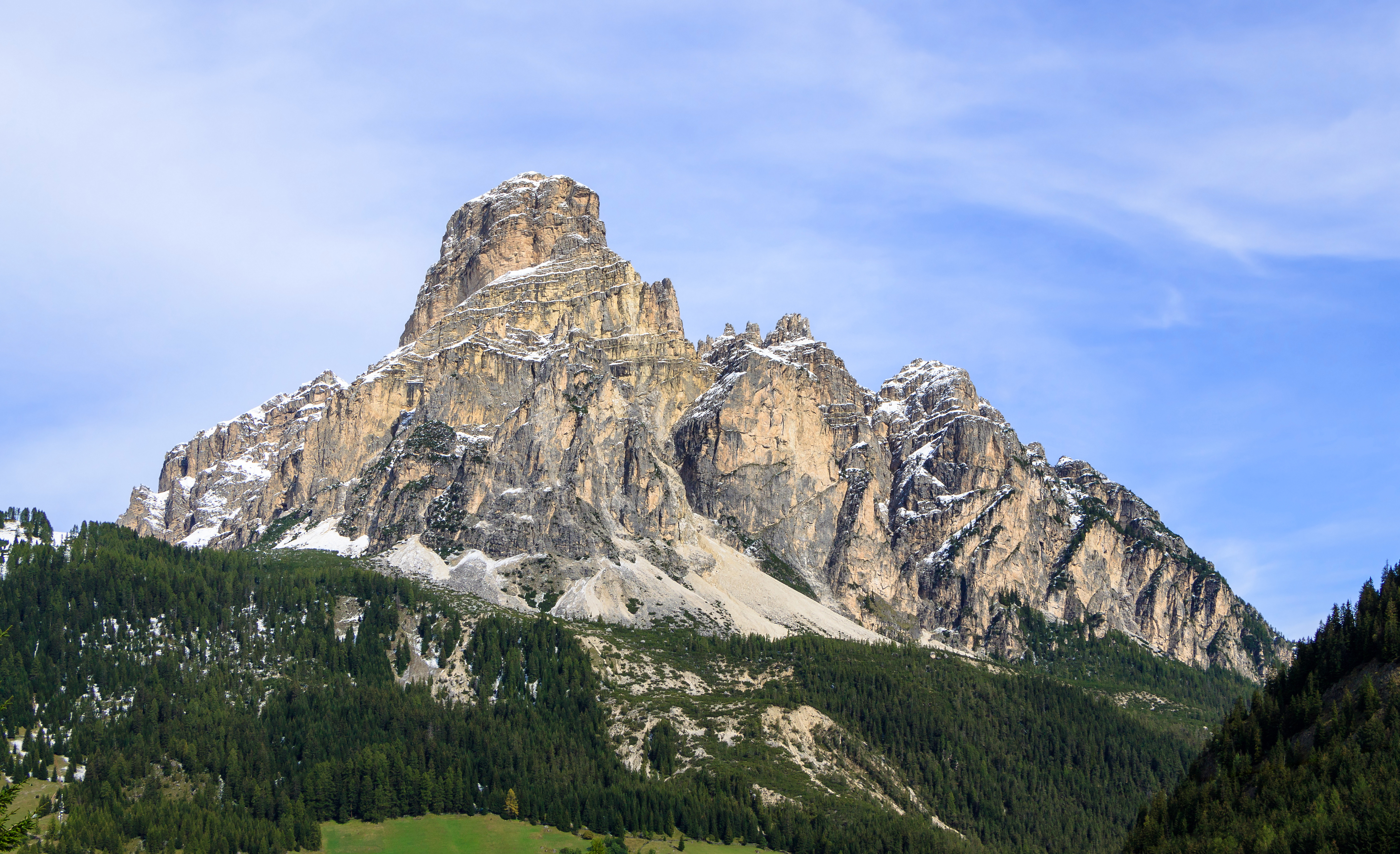

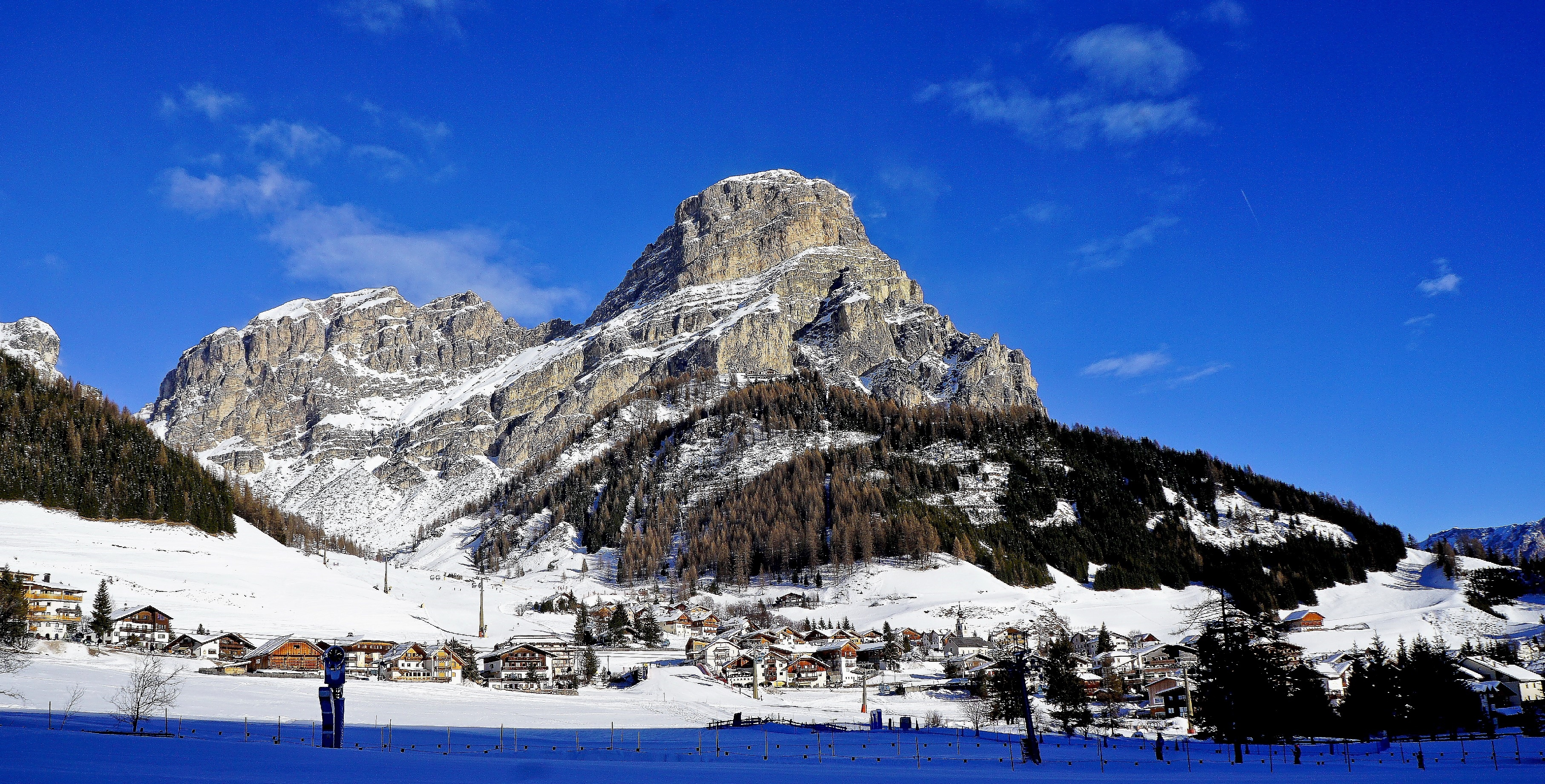
Sassongher viewed with village of Calfosch

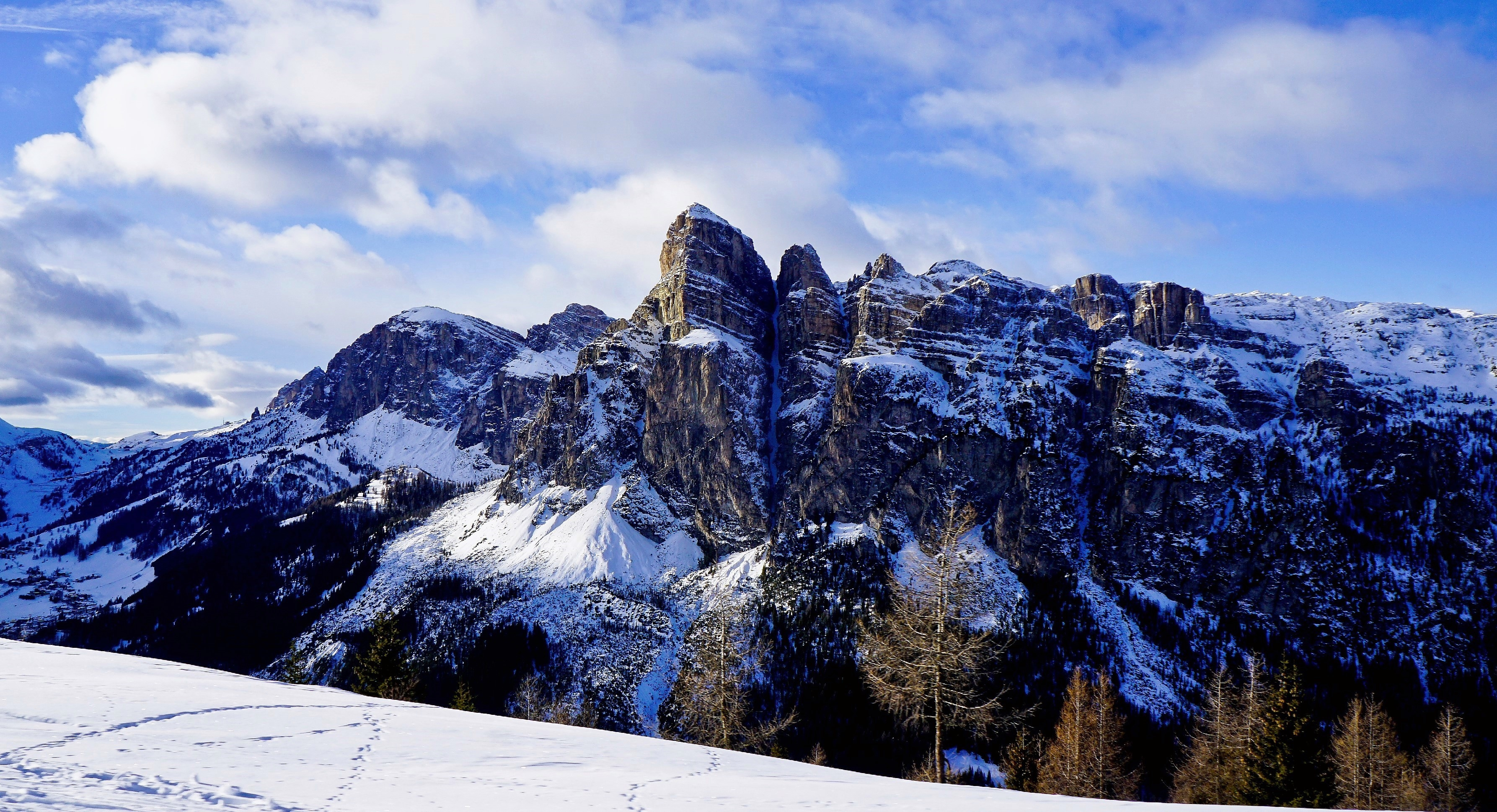
East aspect

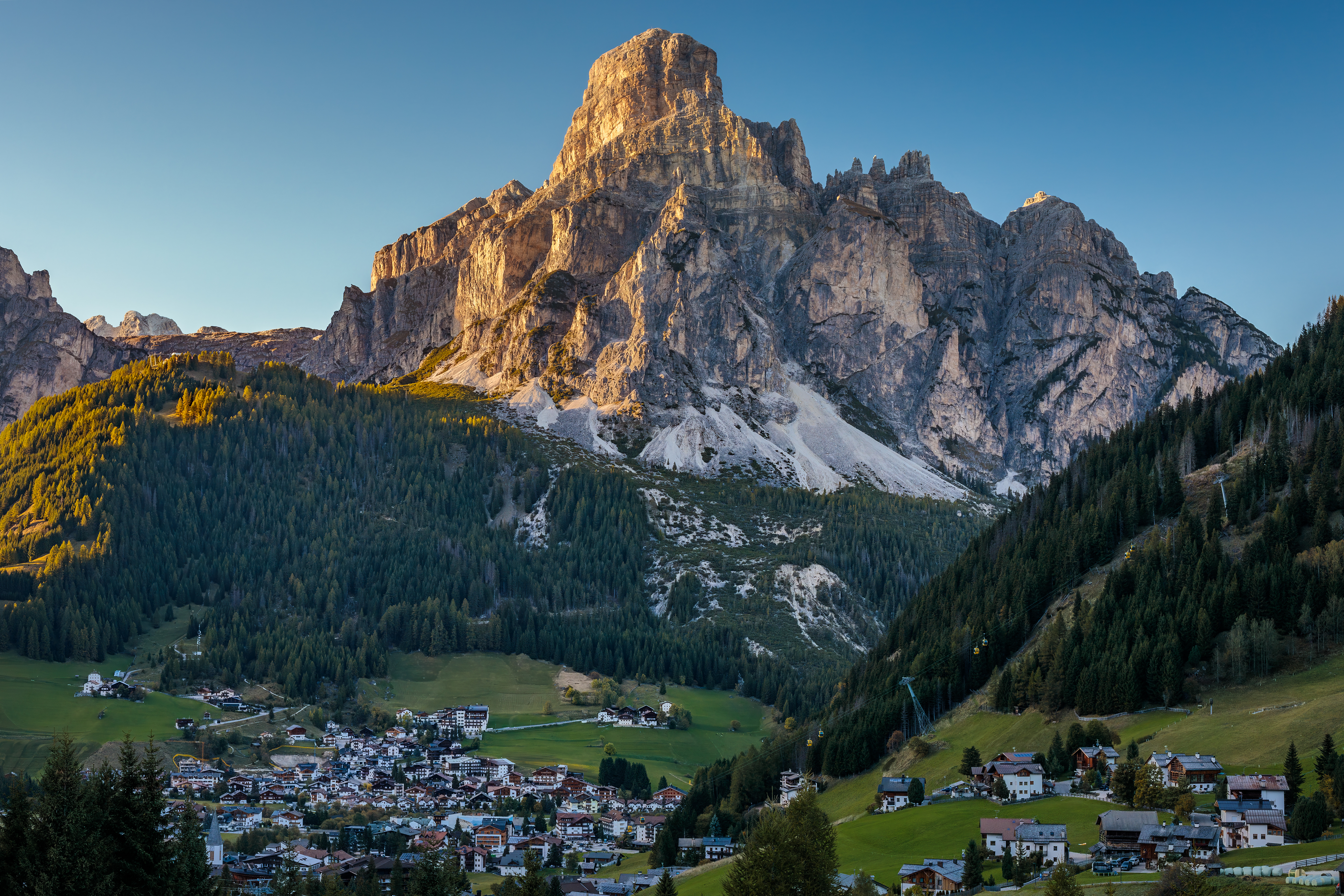
Sassongher rises above Corvara

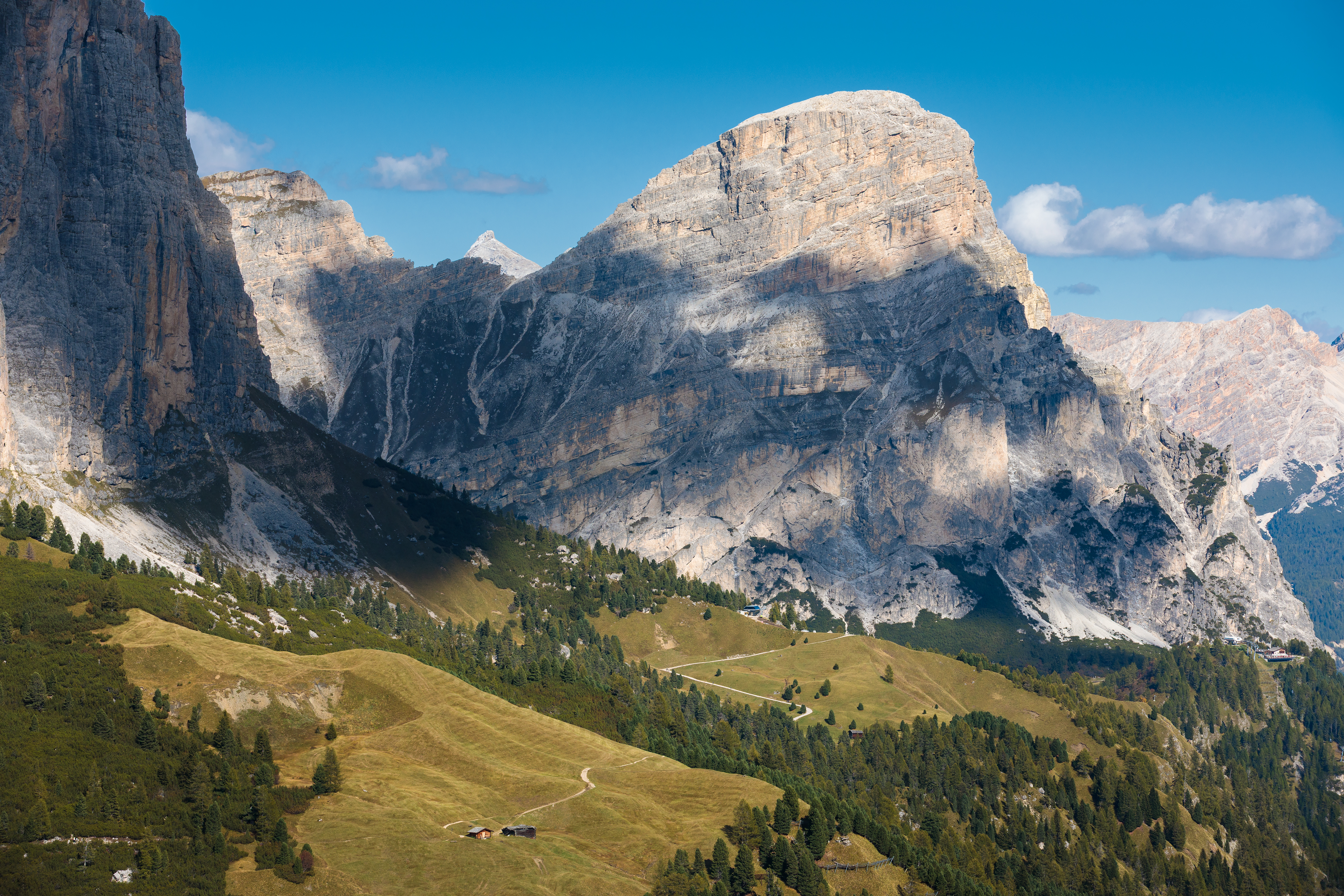
Southwest aspect

== See also ==
- Southern Limestone Alps
