= Lungiarü =

Coordinates: 46°38′28″N 11°51′46″E

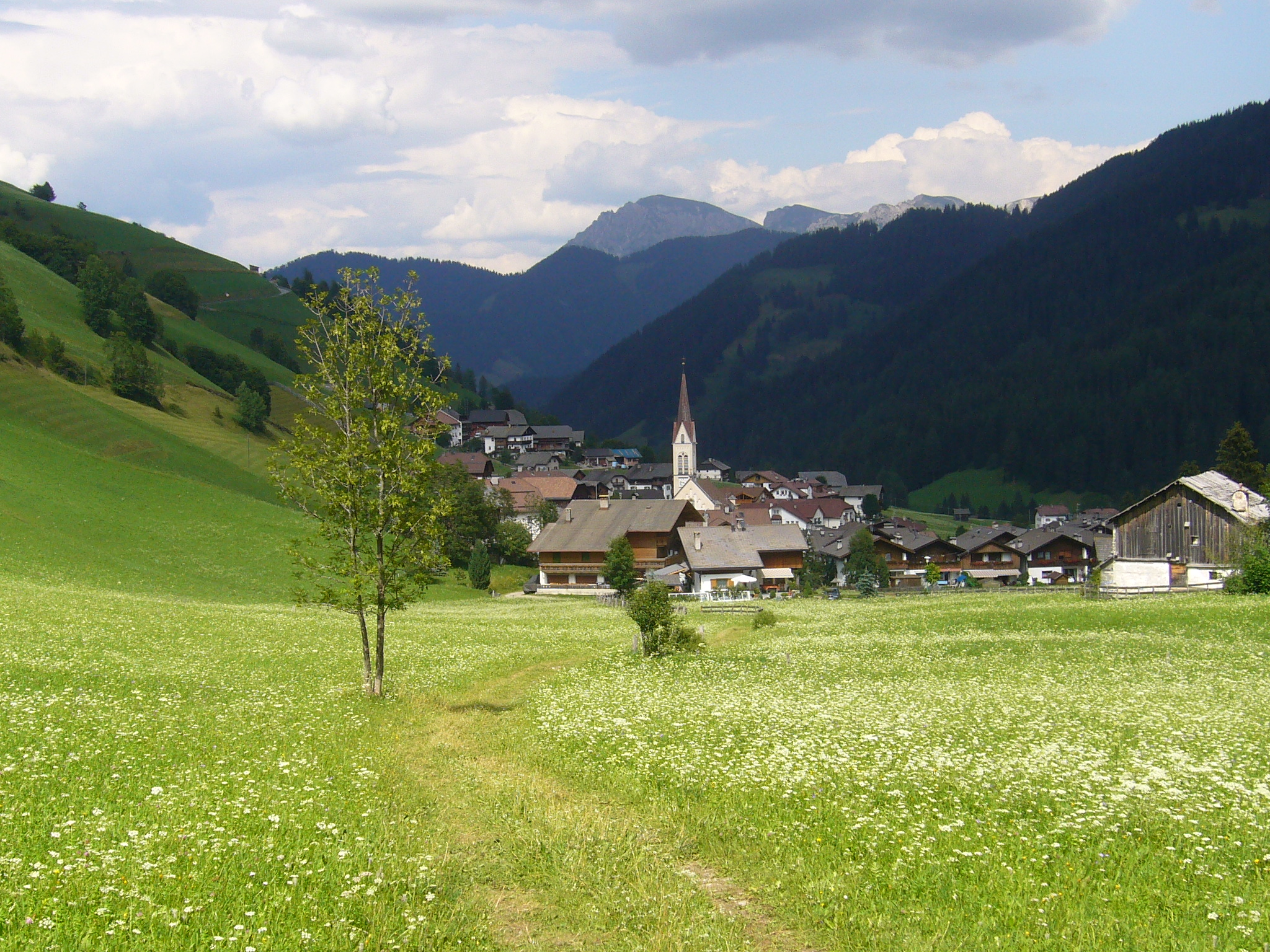
Lungiarü

Lungiarü (German: Campill, Italian: Longiarù) is a village which forms a frazione of the commune of San Martin de Tor in South Tyrol, northern Italy. It is located in the Val Badia at an altitude of 1,398 metres. The hamlet traditionally consisted of a series of "Les Viles", which are "small clusters of old buildings, built of stone and wood, that you can see on the hillside."

It has a natural luge track in the winter.
