= Laag =

Laag Låg
- Frazione
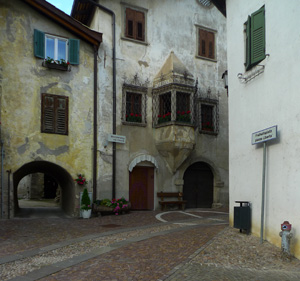

- Location of Laag in Italy
- Coordinates: 46°19′0″N 11°16′0″E
- Country: Italy
- Region: Trentino-Alto Adige/Südtirol
- Province: South Tyrol (BZ)
- Comune: Neumarkt

Area
  - Total: 2,366 km^{2} (914 sq mi)
- Elevation: 213 m (699 ft)

Population (April 2010)
  - Total: 1,207
  - Density: 0.5101/km^{2} (1.321/sq mi)
- Demonym(s): Local Tyrolean dialect: Låger; German: Laager; Italian: Lagheri
- Time zone: UTC+1 (CET)
  - Summer (DST): UTC+2 (CEST)
- Postal code: 39044
- Dialing code: 0471
- Patron saint: St. Laurence
- Saint day: 10 August

Laag (German: Laag; Italian: Laghetti; local Tyrolean dialect: Låg) is a frazione of the comune of Neumarkt in South Tyrol in the Italian region of Trentino-Alto Adige/Südtirol, located about 30 km northeast of the city of Trento and about 25 km south of the city of Bolzano. Laag is situated on the plain (213 m) on the left side of the Adige river.

== Etymology ==
The earliest written mention of the name Laag (German: Laag; Italian: Laghetti; local Tyrolean dialect: Låg) was the 1237 document describing the Holy Roman Empire town in the district of Bavaria-Tyrol in the form ze Lage. In 1525 the Tyroler Landesatlas describes it as Lag. The etymological base is to be considered the Germanic låg, in turn derived from the proto-Germanic *lōgą ("site, foundation, field") and proto-Indo -European *legʰ- (to be located, to lie), similar to the Gaelic loch, through the Latin lacus (lake).

== History ==
Laag is prominently mentioned in the Weistum of Salurn as of 1413, whereas die Lager, the Laag's village people, had to carry out wine transport services to the Habsburgian duke.
