= San Martin de Tor =

- Comune
- Comun de San Martin de Tor; Gemeinde St. Martin in Thurn; Comune di San Martino in Badia
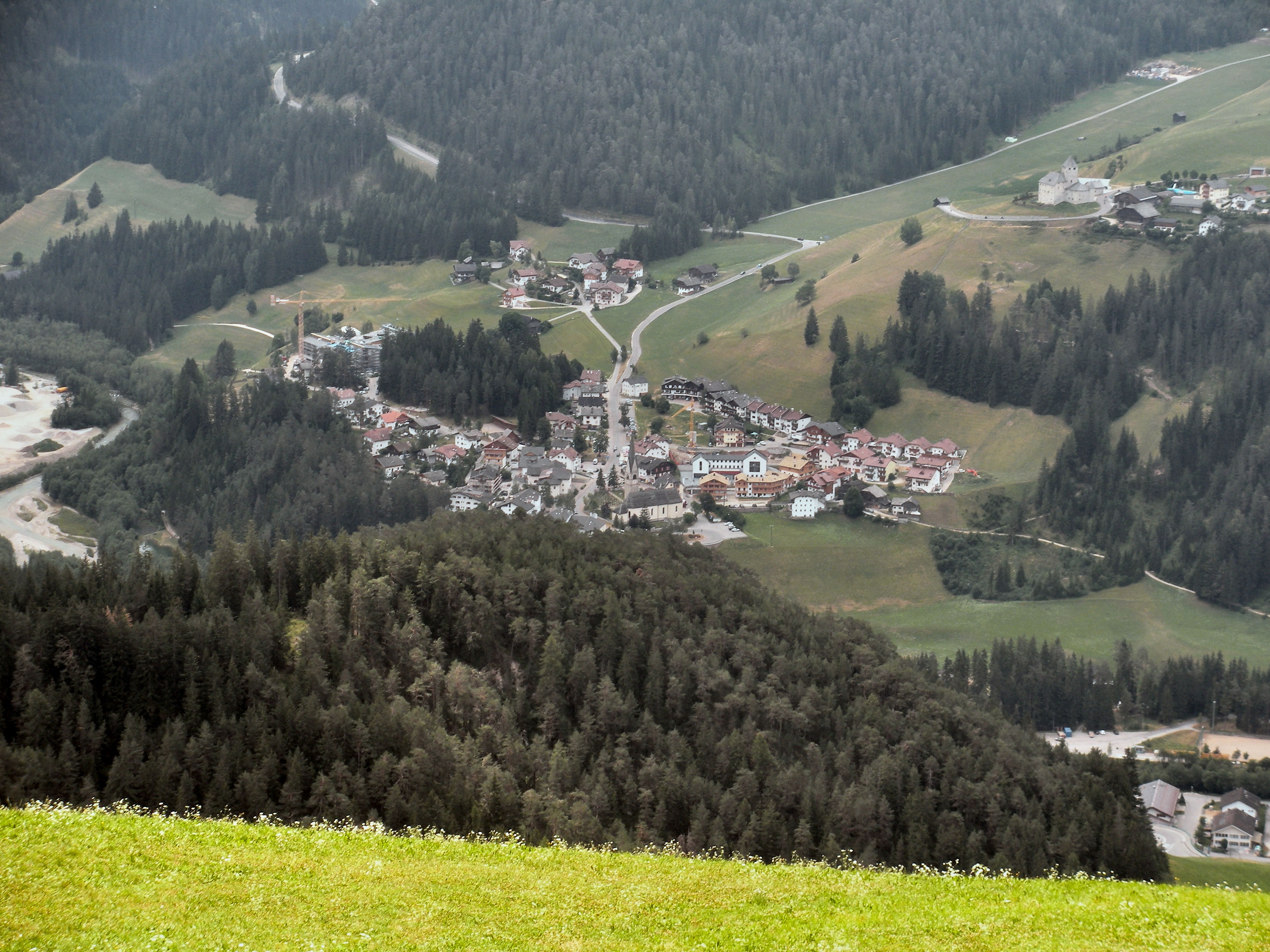
- View of San Martin de Tor

- Location within Italy Location within Trentino-Alto Adige/Südtirol
- Coordinates: 46°41′N 11°54′E
- Country: Italy
- Region: Trentino-Alto Adige/Südtirol
- Province: South Tyrol (BZ)
- Frazioni: Antermëia (Antermoia/Untermoi), Lungiarü (Longiarù/Campill), Picolin (Piccolino/Pikolein)

Government
  - Mayor: Giorgio Costabiei

Area
  - Total: 76.5 km^{2} (29.5 sq mi)
- Elevation: 1,127 m (3,698 ft)

Population (Nov. 2010)
  - Total: 1,726
  - Density: 22.6/km^{2} (58.4/sq mi)
- Demonym(s): German: Italian: badiotti
- Time zone: UTC+1 (CET)
  - Summer (DST): UTC+2 (CEST)
- Postal code: 39030
- Dialing code: 0474
- Website: Official website

San Martin de Tor (Italian: San Martino in Badia [sam marˈtiːno im baˈdiːa]; German: St. Martin in Thurn [saŋkt ˈmartɪn ɪn ˈtʊrn]) is a comune (municipality) and a village in South Tyrol in northern Italy, located about 45 kilometres (28 mi) northeast of the city of Bolzano.

== Geography ==
As of 30 November 2010, it had a population of 1,726 and an area of 76.5 square kilometres (29.5 mi^{2}).

San Martin is home to the Istitut Ladin Micurà de Rü, which is tasked with preserving and promoting the Ladin culture and language.

San Martin borders the following municipalities: Badia, Brixen, Corvara, La Val, Lüsen, Mareo, Santa Cristina Gherdëina, Sëlva and Villnöß.

=== Frazioni ===
The municipality contains the frazioni (subdivisions, mainly villages and hamlets) of Antermëia (Antermoia/Untermoi), Lungiarü (Longiarù/Campill), and Picolin (Piccolino/Pikolein).

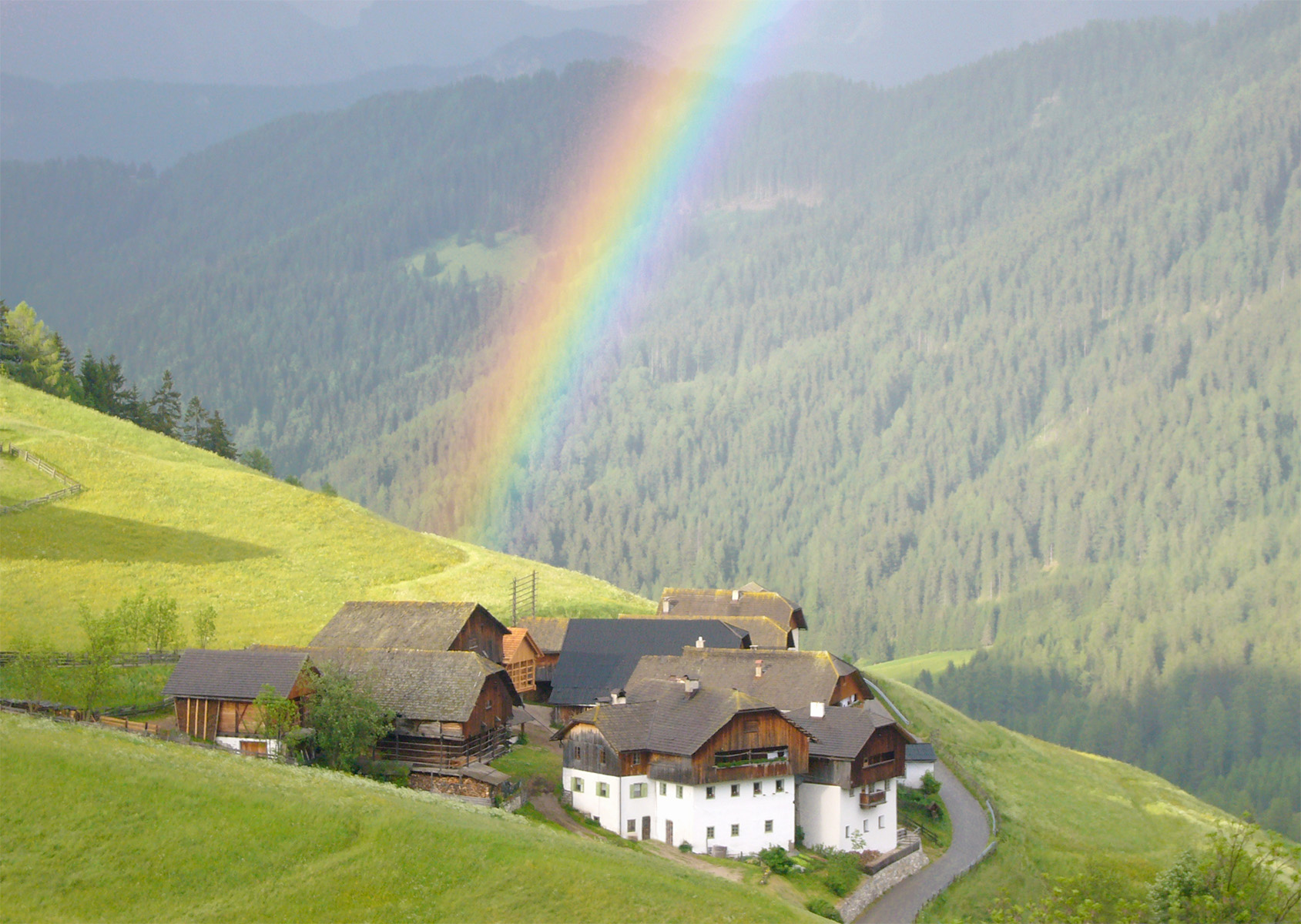
Seres in Lungiarü

== History ==
=== Coat-of-arms ===
The shield is party per cross: the first quarter represents an argent tower with an azure roof on sable; the second one is an argent cross pattée on gules, above three vert mountains. The third part of vert and the fourth of sable. The tower is a reference to Tor Castle and resumes the insignia of a noble family; the cross over the mountains recalls that the town was once the Courts.

== Society ==
=== Linguistic distribution ===
According to the 2024 census, 92.78% of the population speak Ladin, 4.87% Italian and 2.35% German as first language.

=== Demographic evolution ===
Historical population

Year	Pop.	±%
1861	?	—
1871	?	—
1881	?	—
1901	?	—
1911	?	—

Year	Pop.	±%
1921	1,122	—
1931	1,153	+2.8%
1936	1,159	+0.5%
1951	1,198	+3.4%
1961	1,332	+11.2%

Year	Pop.	±%
1971	1,374	+3.2%
1981	1,427	+3.9%
1991	1,495	+4.8%
2001	1,690	+13.0%

Source: Data from ISTAT
