= Istitut Ladin Micurà de Rü =

Italian cultural institute

The Istitut Ladin Micurà de Rü is a government-financed cultural institute in South Tyrol, Italy, tasked with preserving and promoting the Ladin language and culture.

== Foundation and name ==
The institute was set up by the Autonomous Province Bolzano – South Tyrol on 31 July 1976 and formally started its activity on 3 September 1977 in the Ladin village San Martin de Tor. The institute was named in honour of the Ladin linguist Micurà de Rü, who in 1833 published the first Ladin grammar "Versuch einer deütsch-ladinischen Sprachlehre".

The institute's main objectives are:

- to scientifically study the language, the history and the culture of the Ladin people.
- to promote the use and teaching of the Ladin language in cooperation with the schools in Ladin communes and the Ladin Pedagogical Institute.
- to preserve and cultivate the culture, customs and traditions, art and music of the Ladin people.
- to support all venues that help to preserve the oral and written Ladin language i.e. radio transmissions, newspapers, books, cultural and-or educational events.
- to set up a historical archive of the Ladin culture.
- to set up a research library.
- to coordinate, cooperate and support the scientific work and research of the Ladin language and culture carried out by other universities and other research institutions.
- to improve the relationship and cultural exchange between the Ladins of the Dolomites and those of Graubünden and Friuli regions.

== Today ==
Today, the institute's headquarters remains in San Martín de Tor and a branch has been opened in Sëlva in the Val Gardena. The institute's task is to preserve, protect, and promote the Ladin language and culture. To achieve its aims, the institute cooperates with numerous national and international universities and supports scientific projects that focus on the Ladin language or culture. Since its founding, the institute has published over 230 books in various languages about the Ladin language and culture.

Currently, the institute's main projects are:

- the publication of Ladin vocabularies for the two main Ladin language varieties: the Badiot from the Val Badia and the Gherdëin from Val Gardena.
- the creation of an online database named "VoLaNet", which will aid in the coinage of neologisms and will be accessible to everyone.
- the creation of a detailed map of the Ladin valleys containing all Ladin toponyms.
- archaeological excavations on Plan de Frea and on Sotciastel (in the municipality of Santa Cristina Gherdëina), with the aim to learn more about the Ladin history prior to the beginning of the second millennium A.D.
- the creation of the "Linguistic Atlas of Dolomite Ladin and neighbouring dialects" based on vocabulary, morphology and syntax of the Ladin languages.
- and the support of cultural associations with the same aims as itself.

Other activities include: information, consulting and translations services, Ladin teaching courses, organization of scientific conferences, concerts, theatre presentations and art exhibitions, support on doctoral thesis and publication of the annual scientific journal Ladinia – sföi cultural dai ladins dles Dolomites.

== See also ==
- Ladin language
- Language preservation
