= Corvara, South Tyrol =

Corvara in Badia
- Comune
- Comun de Corvara in Badia; Comune di Corvara in Badia; Gemeinde Corvara
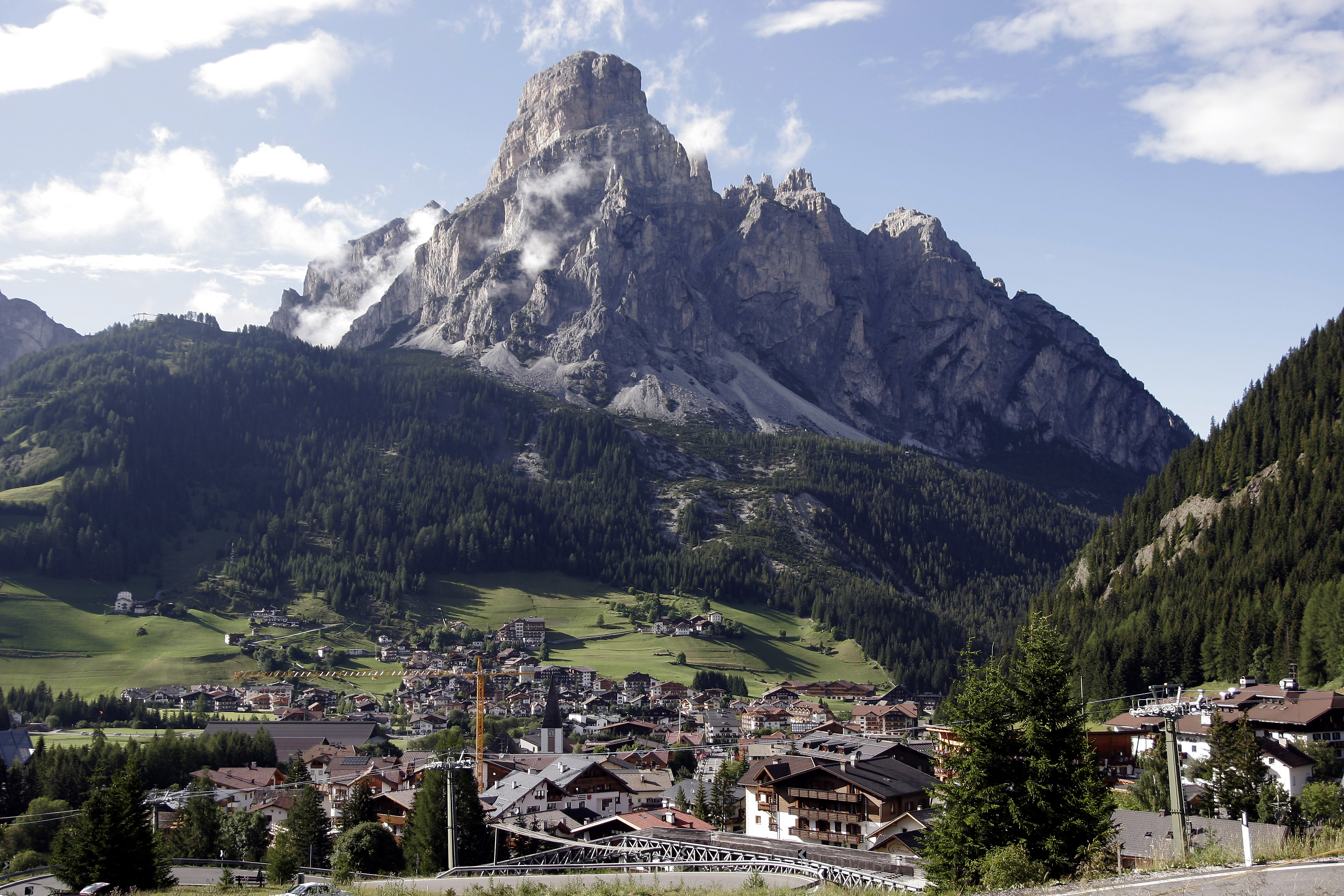
- Corvara in July 2007 with Mount Sassongher in the background

- Location within Italy Location within Trentino-Alto Adige/Südtirol
- Coordinates: 46°33′N 11°52′E
- Country: Italy
- Region: Trentino-Alto Adige/Südtirol
- Province: South Tyrol (BZ)
- Frazioni: Calfosch (Colfosco, Kolfuschg), Pescosta

Government
  - Mayor: Roman Crazzolara

Area
  - Total: 42.2 km^{2} (16.3 sq mi)
- Elevation: 1,568 m (5,144 ft)

Population (Nov. 2010)
  - Total: 1,340
  - Density: 31.8/km^{2} (82.2/sq mi)
- Demonym: Italian: corvaresi or badiotti
- Time zone: UTC+1 (CET)
  - Summer (DST): UTC+2 (CEST)
- Postal code: 39033
- Dialing code: 0471
- Website: Official website

Corvara in Badia (Italian: Corvara in Badia [korˈvaːra im ˈbadiːa]; German: Corvara or Kurfar) is a comune (municipality) and a village in South Tyrol in northern Italy, located about 40 kilometres (25 mi) east of Bolzano.

== Geography ==
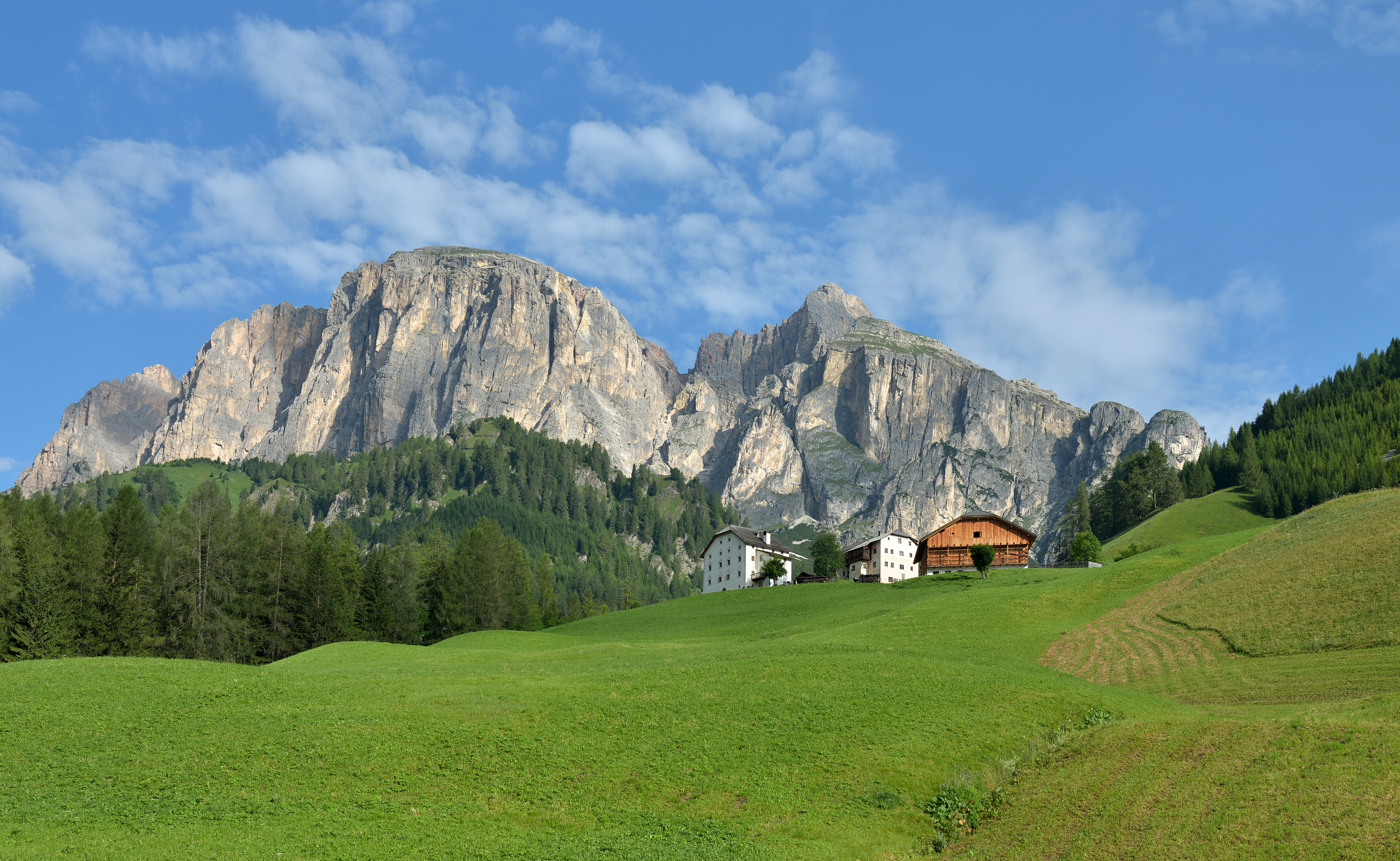
Alpine farmhouse "Sorà" on the left and "Zecca da Ruatscht"

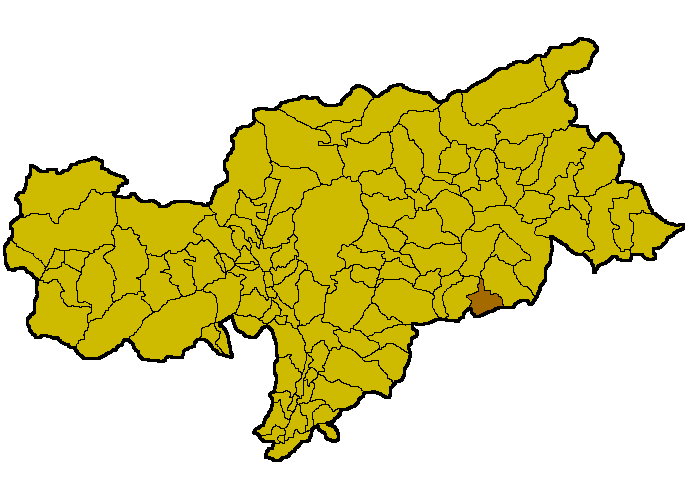
Location in South Tyrol

As of 30 November 2010, it had a population of 1,340 and an area of 42.2 square kilometres (16.3 mi^{2}).

Corvara in Badia borders the following municipalities: Badia, Canazei, Livinallongo del Col di Lana, San Martin de Tor, and Sëlva.

Corvara in Badia is the main center of Alta Badia, a prestigious tourist area located at the top end of the Val Badia, surrounded by the Dolomites mountains.

== Tourism ==
Because of its geographic position, Alta Badia gradually transformed itself into an avantgarde tourist area keeping intact its alpine character. According to Michil Costa, owner of the La Perla luxury hotel in Corvara, interviewed in 2023 for a TV documentary on overtourism in the Alps, the area has too many tourists.

=== Frazioni ===
The municipality contains the frazioni Calfosch (Italian: Colfosco, German: Kolfuschg) and Pescosta.

== History ==
=== Coat of arms ===
The emblem represents three vert mountains, dominated by three gules peaks with the inclined top on an argent background. The three peaks represent the Sassongher mountain overlooking the village. The emblem was granted in 1969.

== Society ==
=== Demographic evolution ===
Historical population

| Year | Pop. | ±% |
|---|---|---|
| 1861 | ? | — |
| 1871 | ? | — |
| 1881 | ? | — |
| 1901 | ? | — |
| 1911 | ? | — |

| Year | Pop. | ±% |
|---|---|---|
| 1921 | 436 | — |
| 1931 | 420 | −3.7% |
| 1936 | 477 | +13.6% |
| 1951 | 577 | +21.0% |
| 1961 | 682 | +18.2% |

| Year | Pop. | ±% |
|---|---|---|
| 1971 | 951 | +39.4% |
| 1981 | 1,183 | +24.4% |
| 1991 | 1,236 | +4.5% |
| 2001 | 1,266 | +2.4% |

Source: Data from ISTAT

=== Linguistic distribution ===
According to the 2024 census, 87.12% of the population speak Ladin, 10.23% Italian and 2.65% German as first language.

== Sport ==
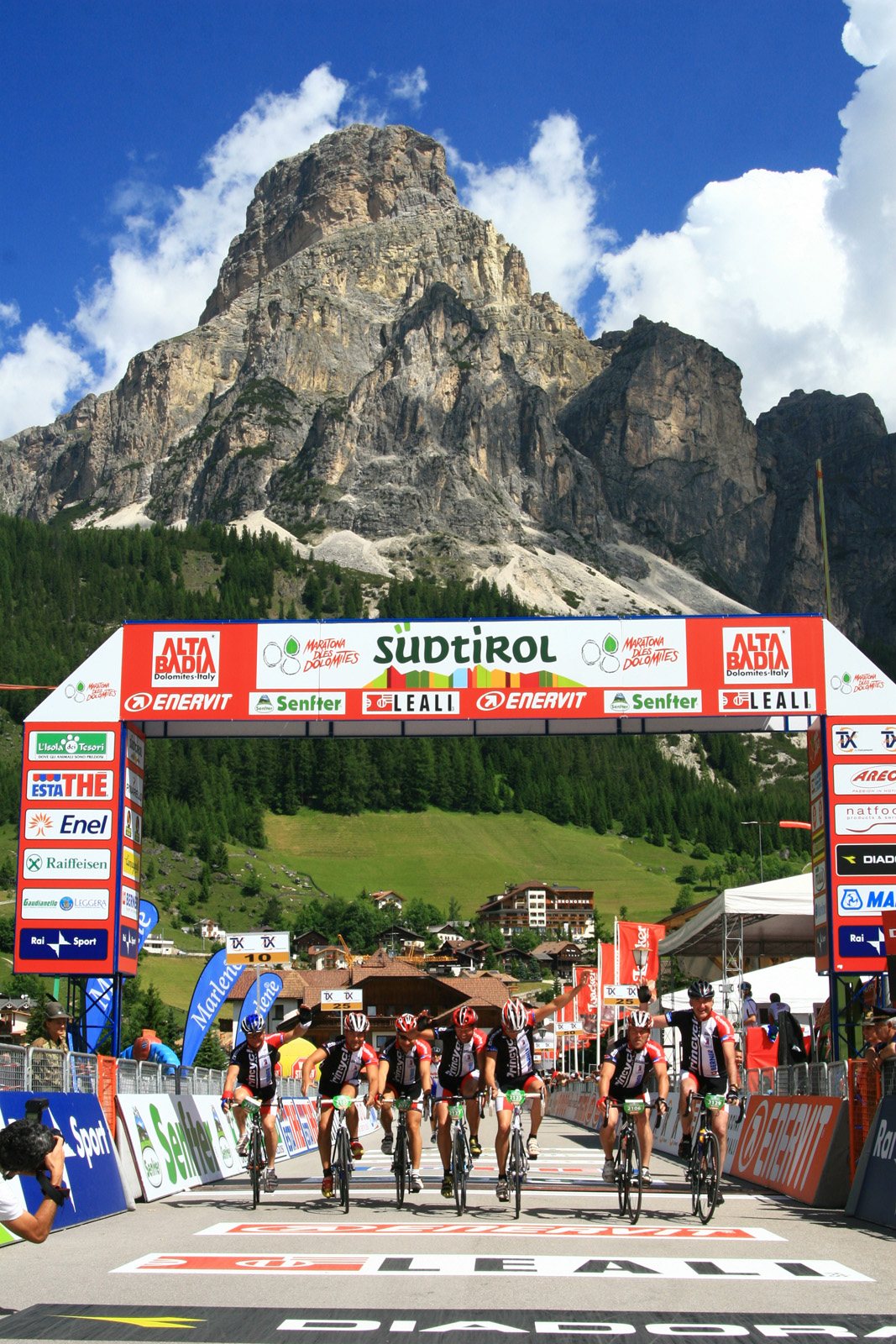
Maratona dles Dolomites finish in Corvara under the Sassongher Mountain

=== Maratona dles Dolomites ===
The finish of the annual single-day seven mountain passes crossing Maratona dles Dolomites bicycle race is in Corvara.

== See also ==
- Alta Badia
- Dolomites
