= Calfosch =

Village in South Tyrol, Italy

Coordinates: 46.553°N 11.855°E

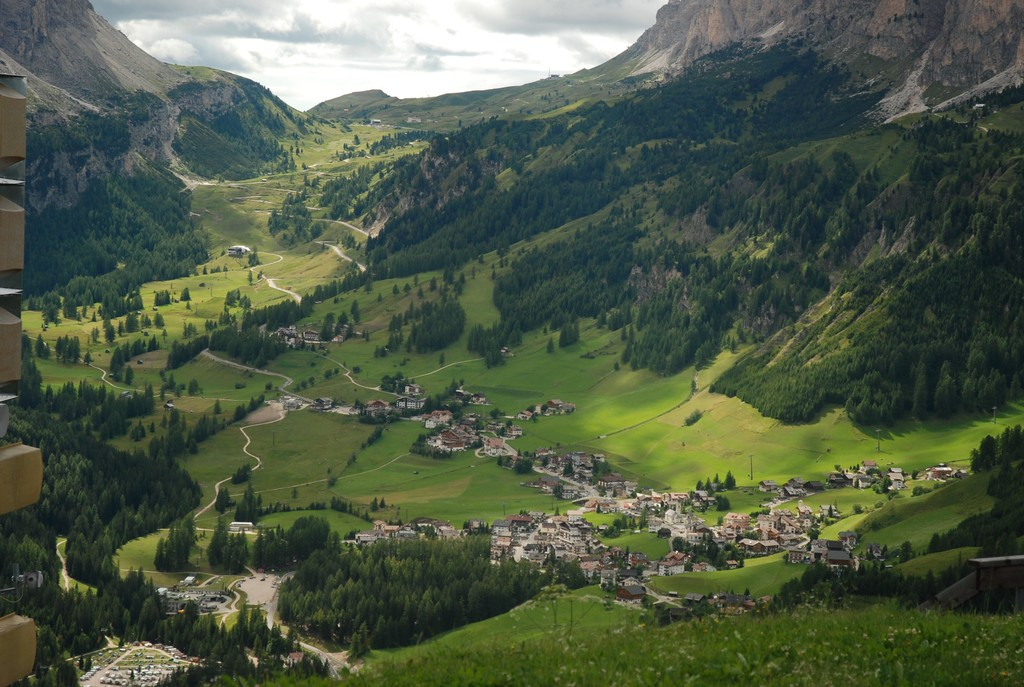
Calfosch

Calfosch (Ladin: Calfosch, German: Kolfuschg, Italian: Colfosco [ˌkɔlˈfosko]) is a mountain village in South Tyrol, Northern Italy. A frazione of the comune (municipality) of Corvara, it is the highest village with permanent residents in the Val Badia at 1,645 metres (5,400 ft) AMSL.
