= Kleinsölk =

- Former municipality
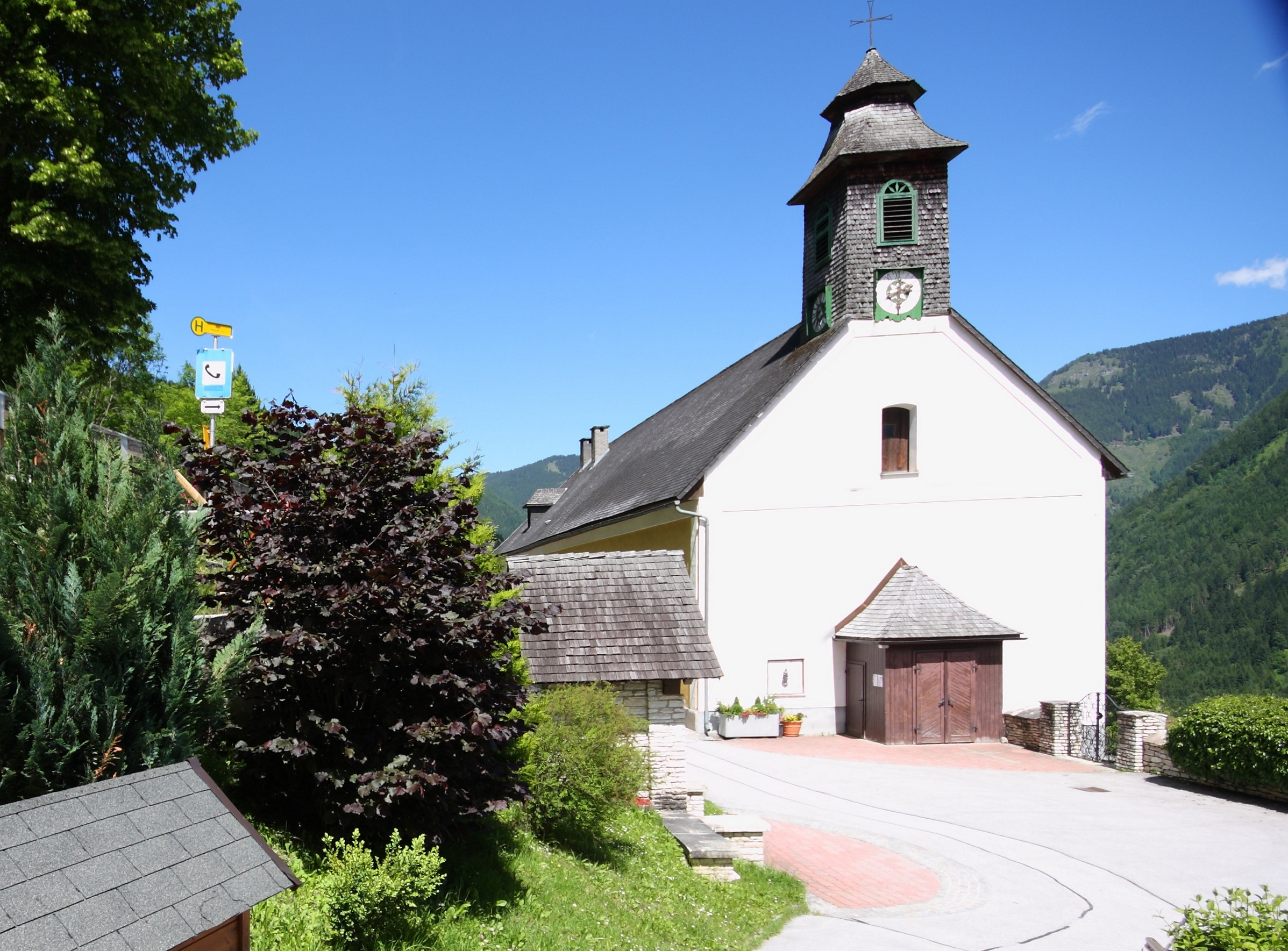
- Kleinsölk parish church

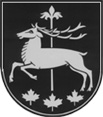
- Coat of arms

- Location within Austria
- Coordinates: 47°23′24″N 13°56′24″E
- Country: Austria
- State: Styria
- District: Liezen

Area
  - Total: 132.29 km^{2} (51.08 sq mi)
- Elevation: 989 m (3,245 ft)

Population (1 January 2016)
  - Total: 583
  - Density: 4.41/km^{2} (11.4/sq mi)
- Time zone: UTC+1 (CET)
  - Summer (DST): UTC+2 (CEST)
- Postal code: 8961, 8921, 8931
- Area code: 03685
- Vehicle registration: GB
- Website: www.kleinsoelk.at

Kleinsölk is a former municipality in the district of Liezen in Styria, Austria. Since the 2015 Styria municipal structural reform, it is part of the municipality Sölk.

== Gallery ==
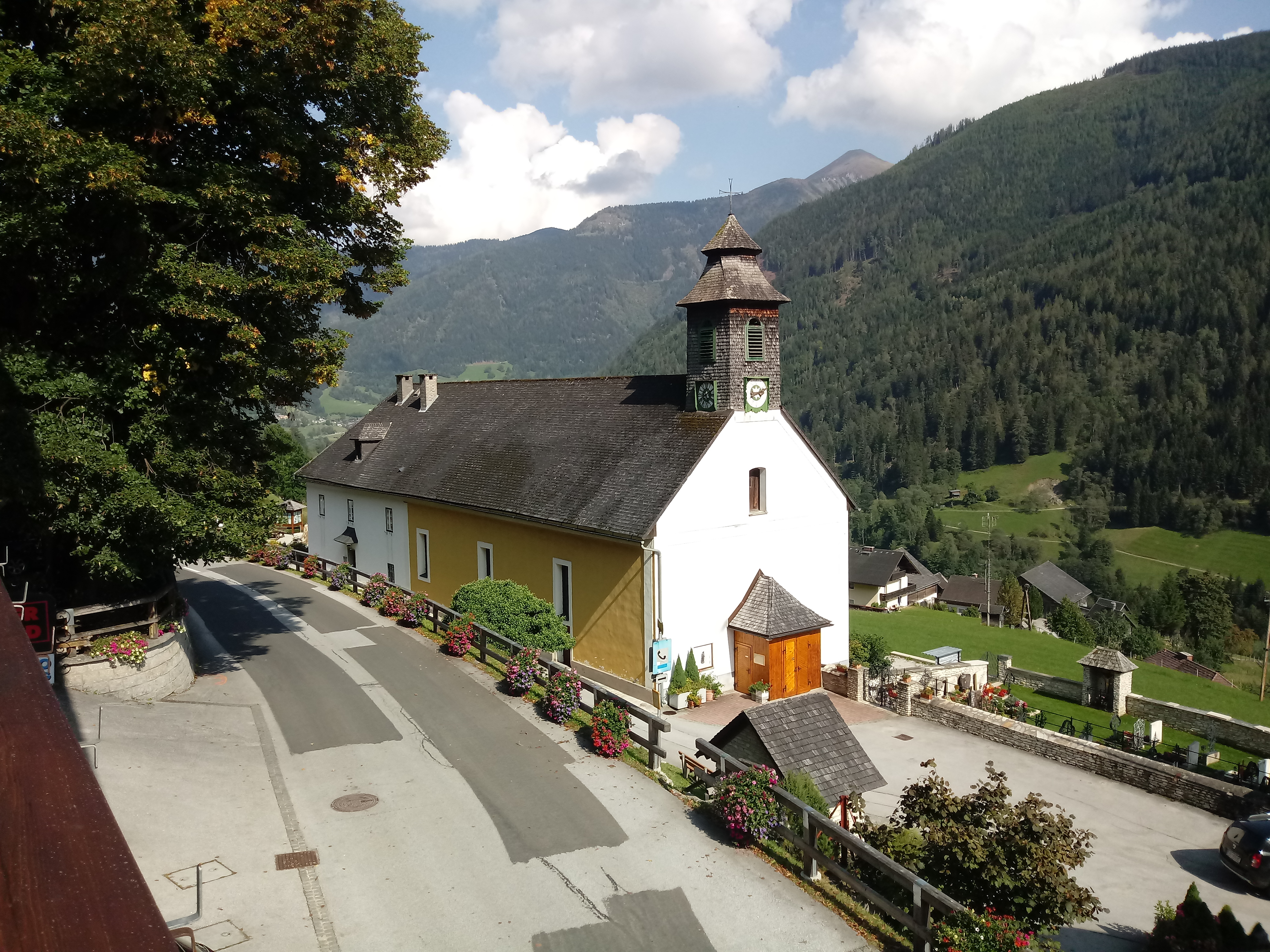

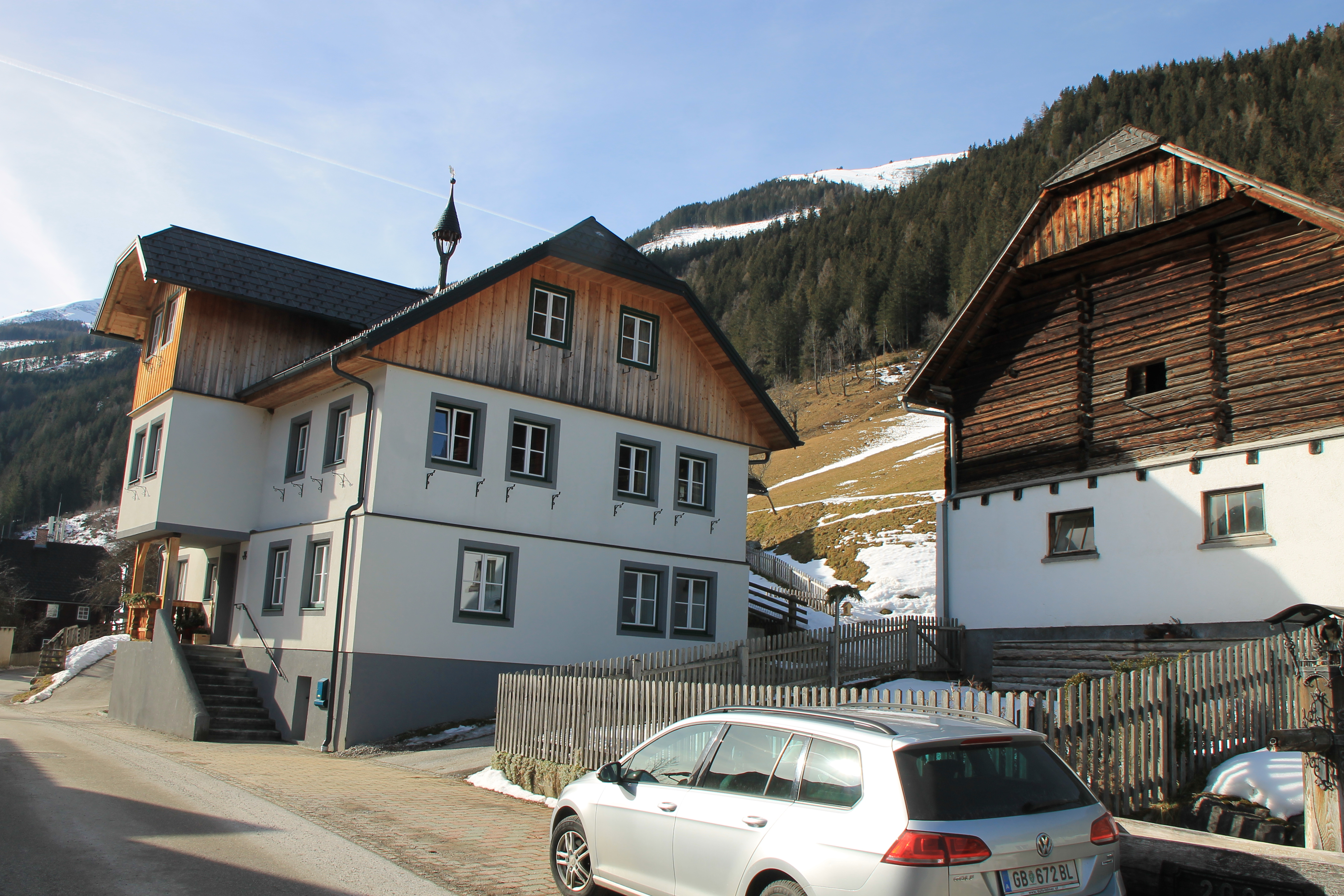

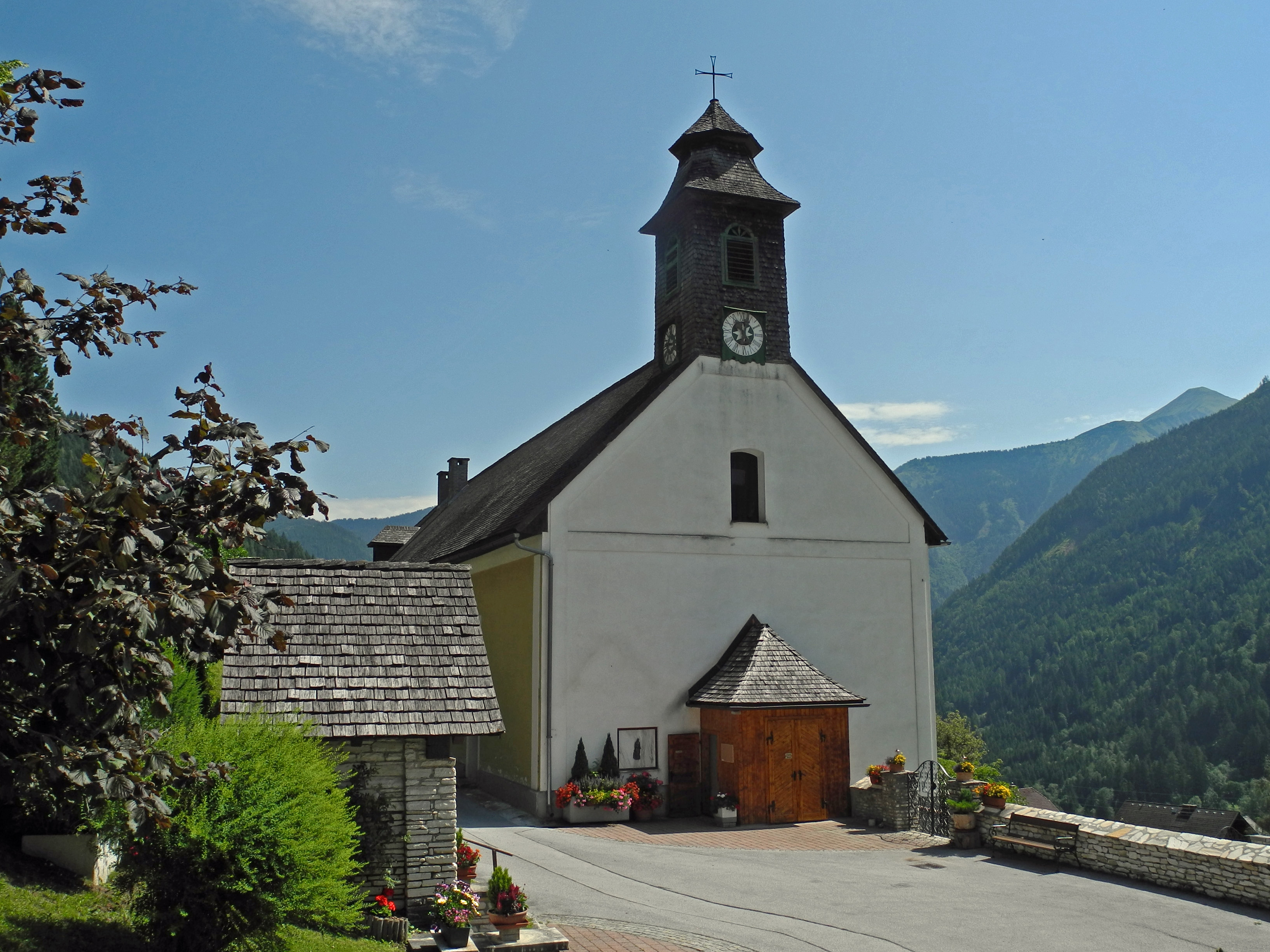

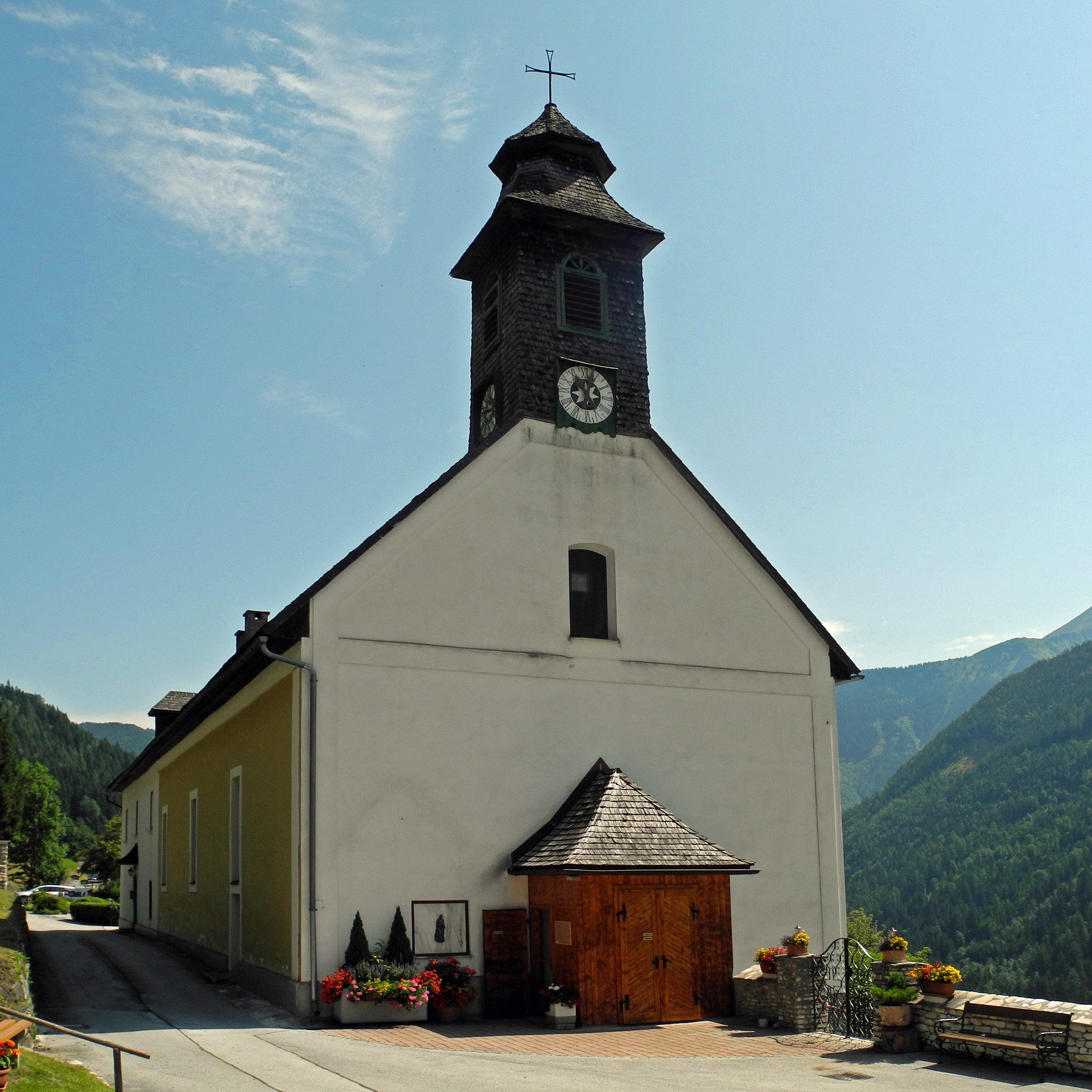

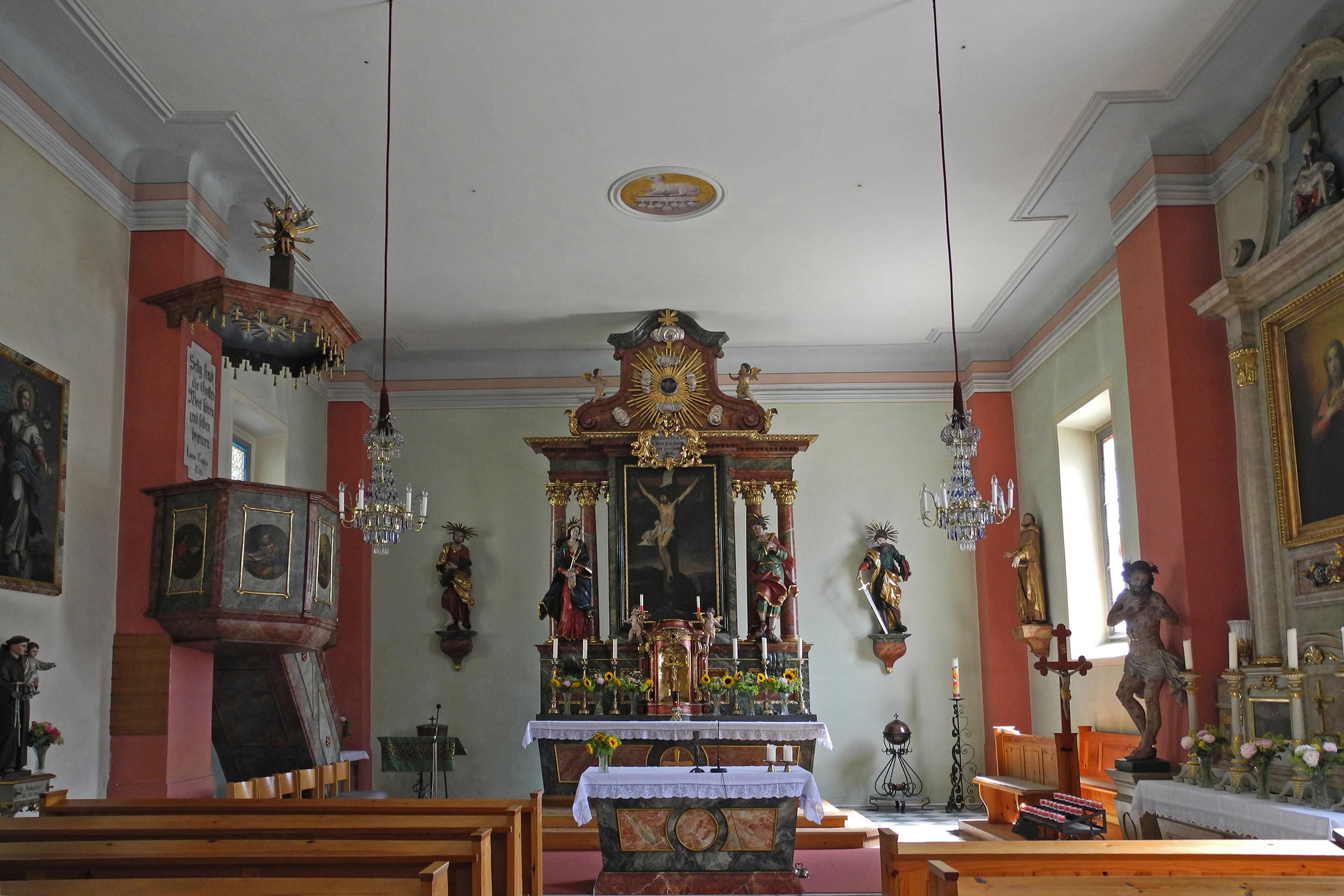

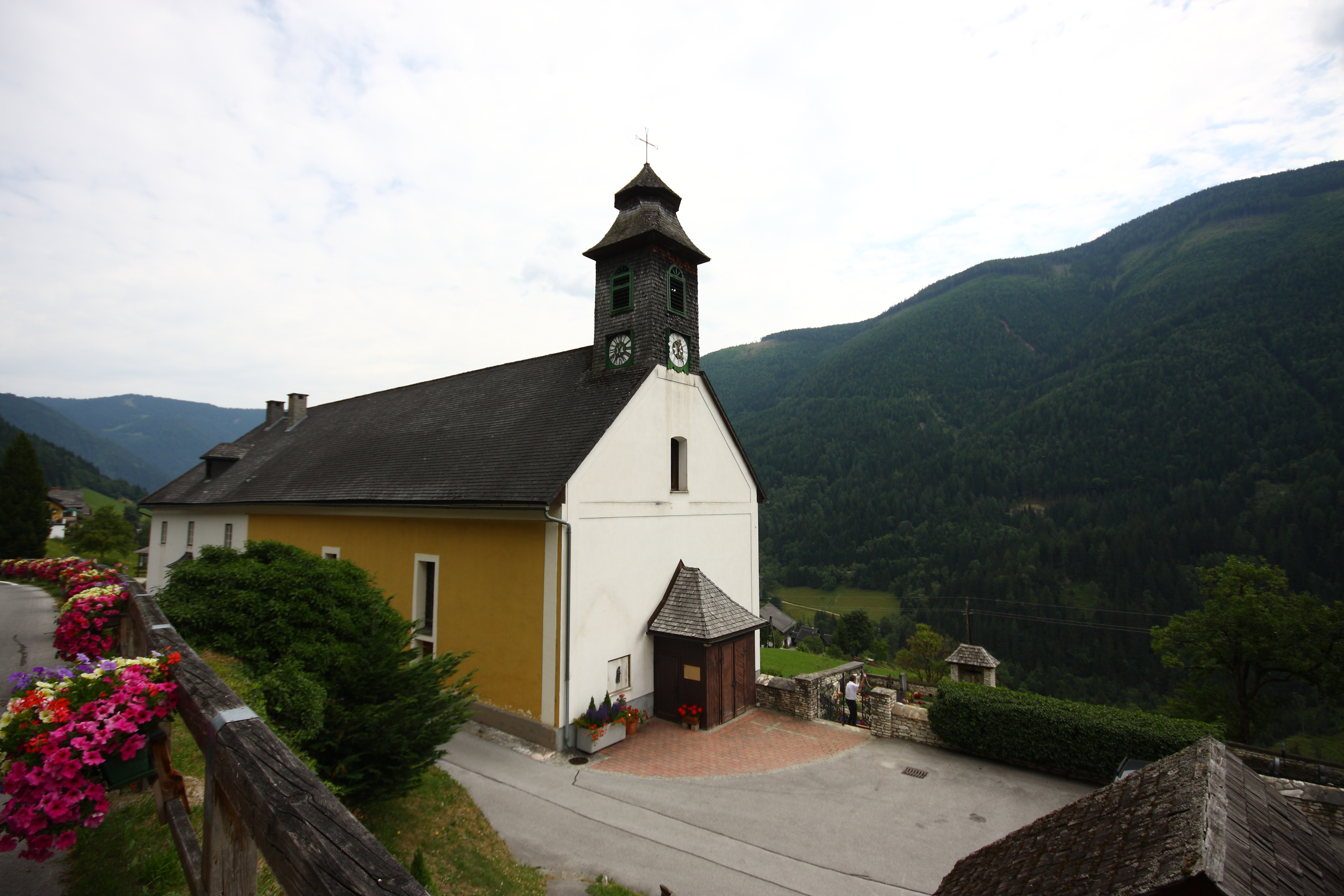

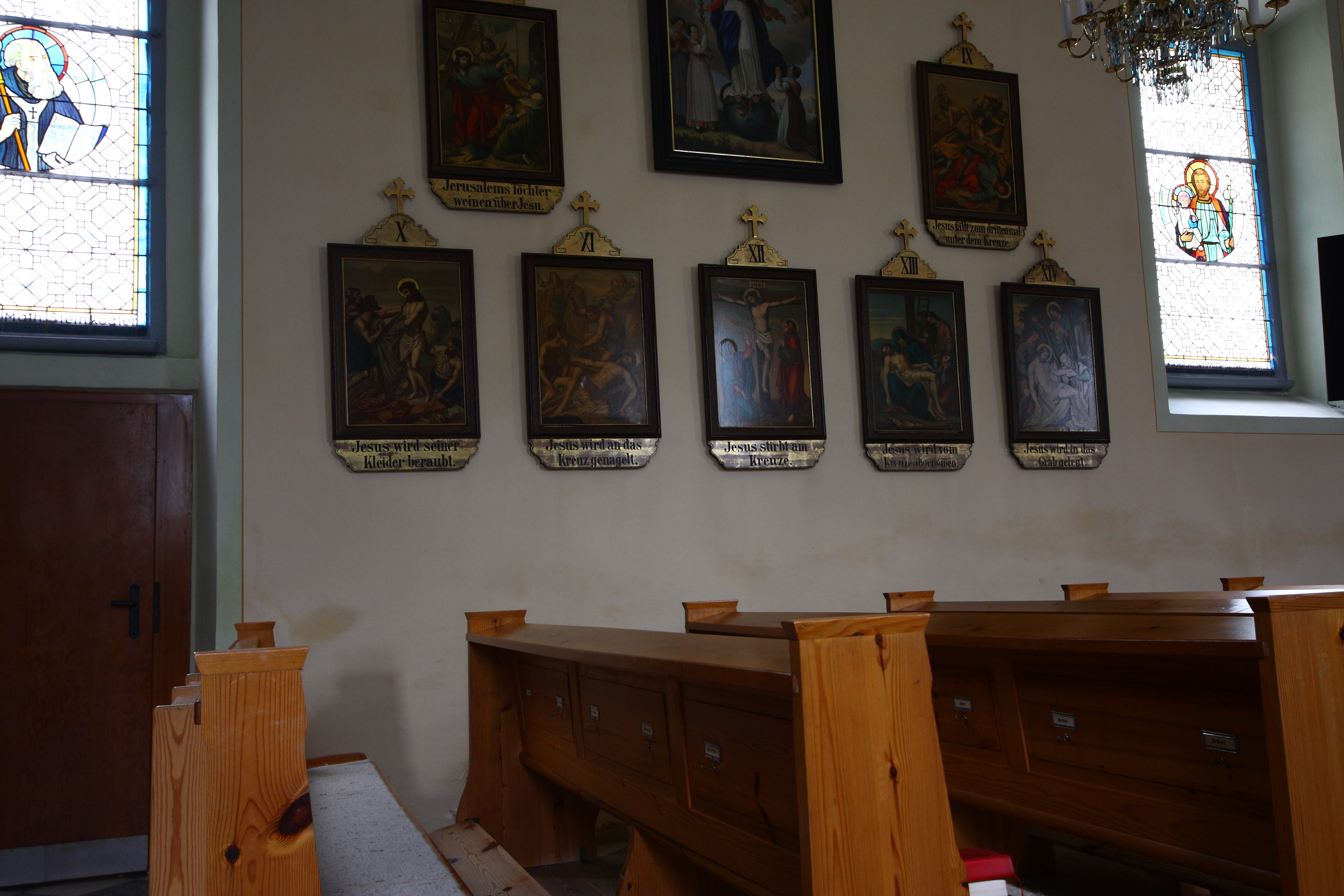

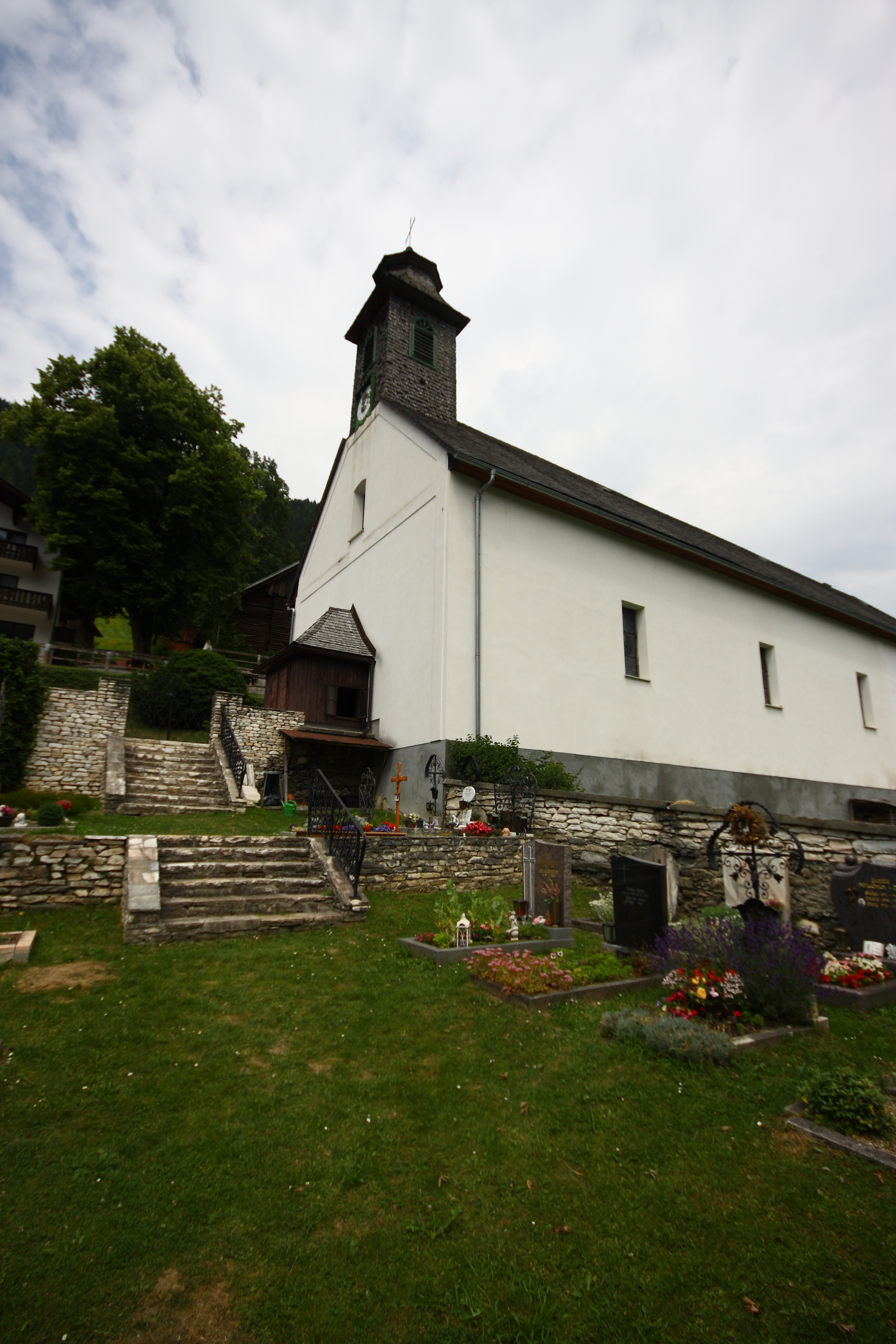

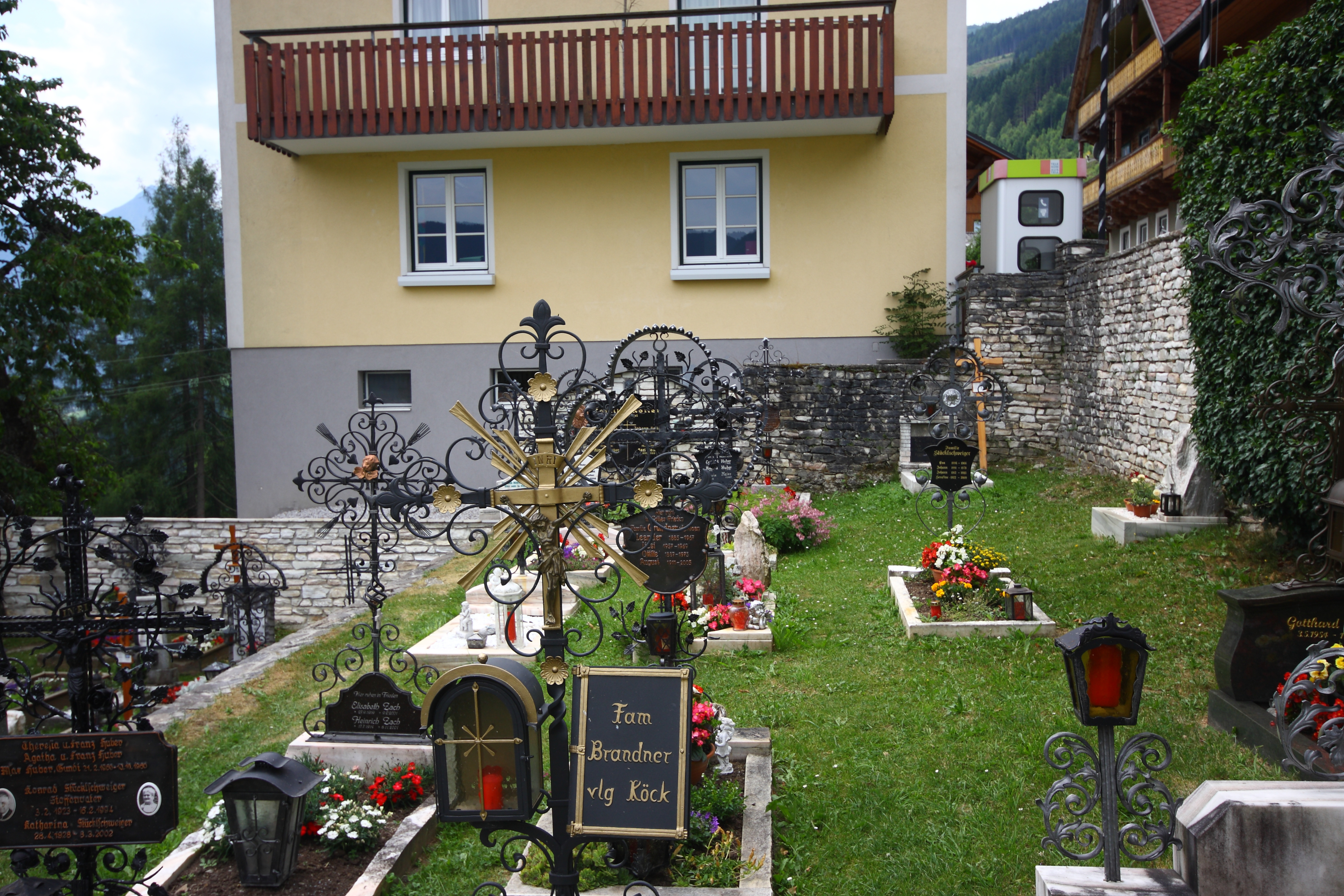

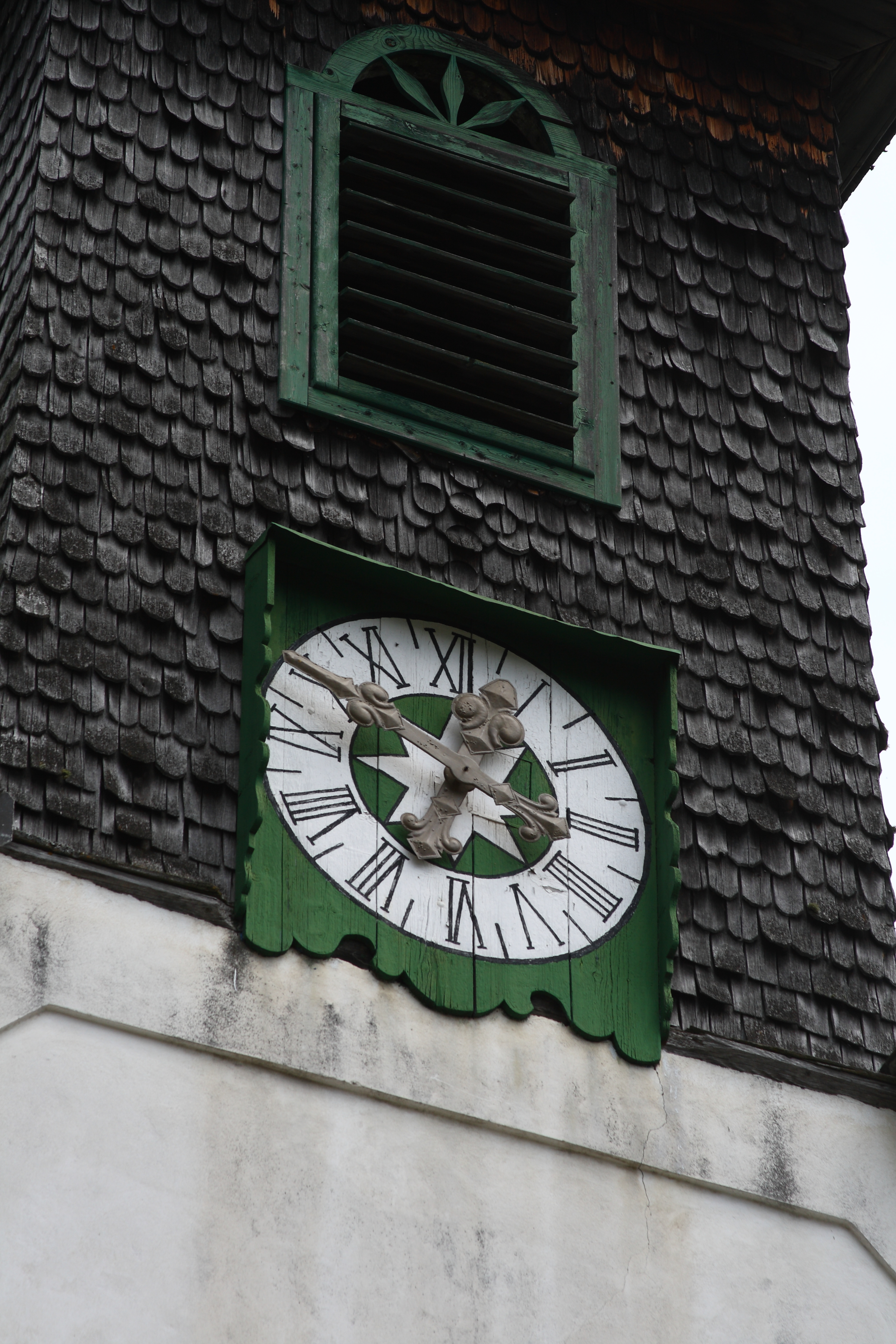

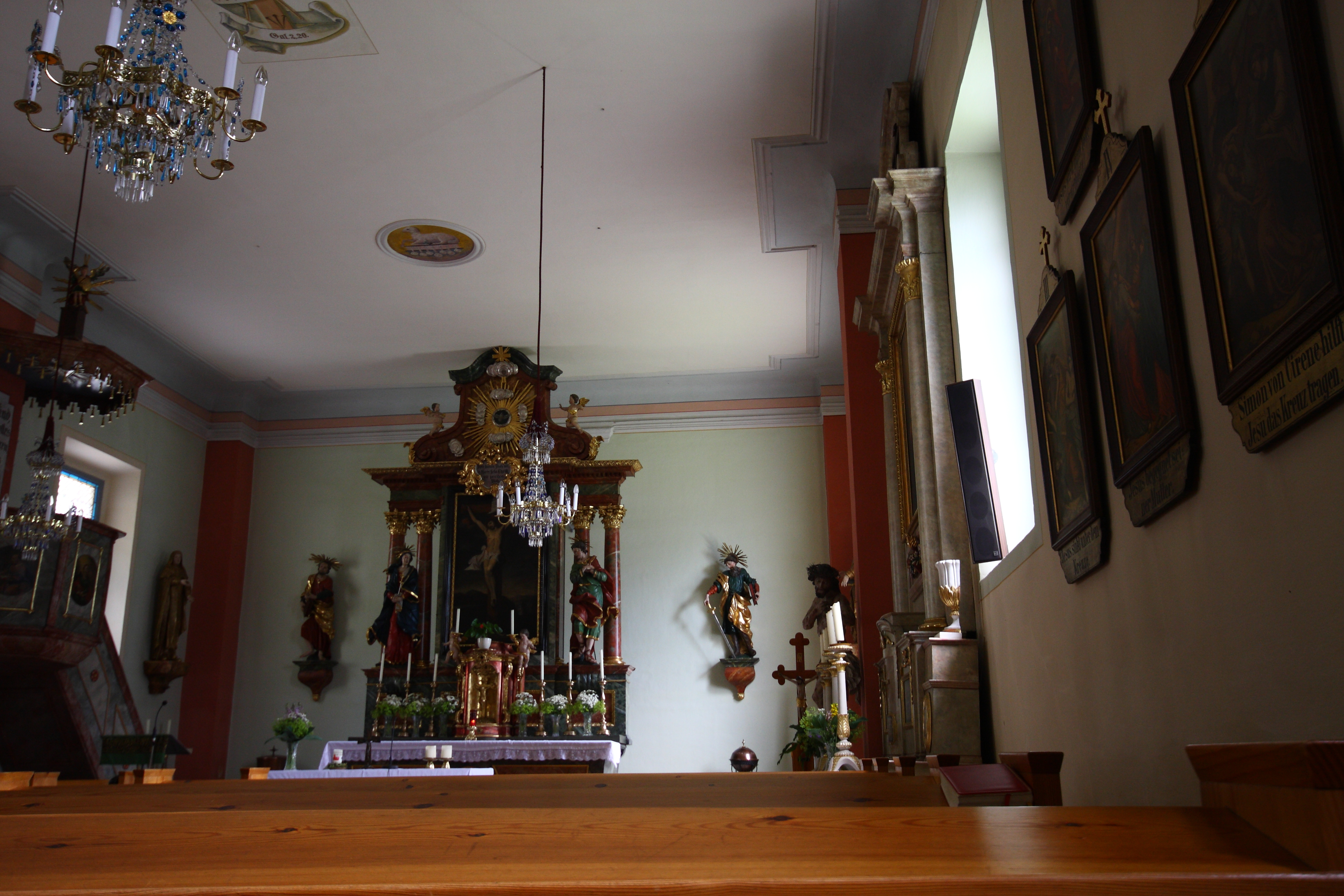

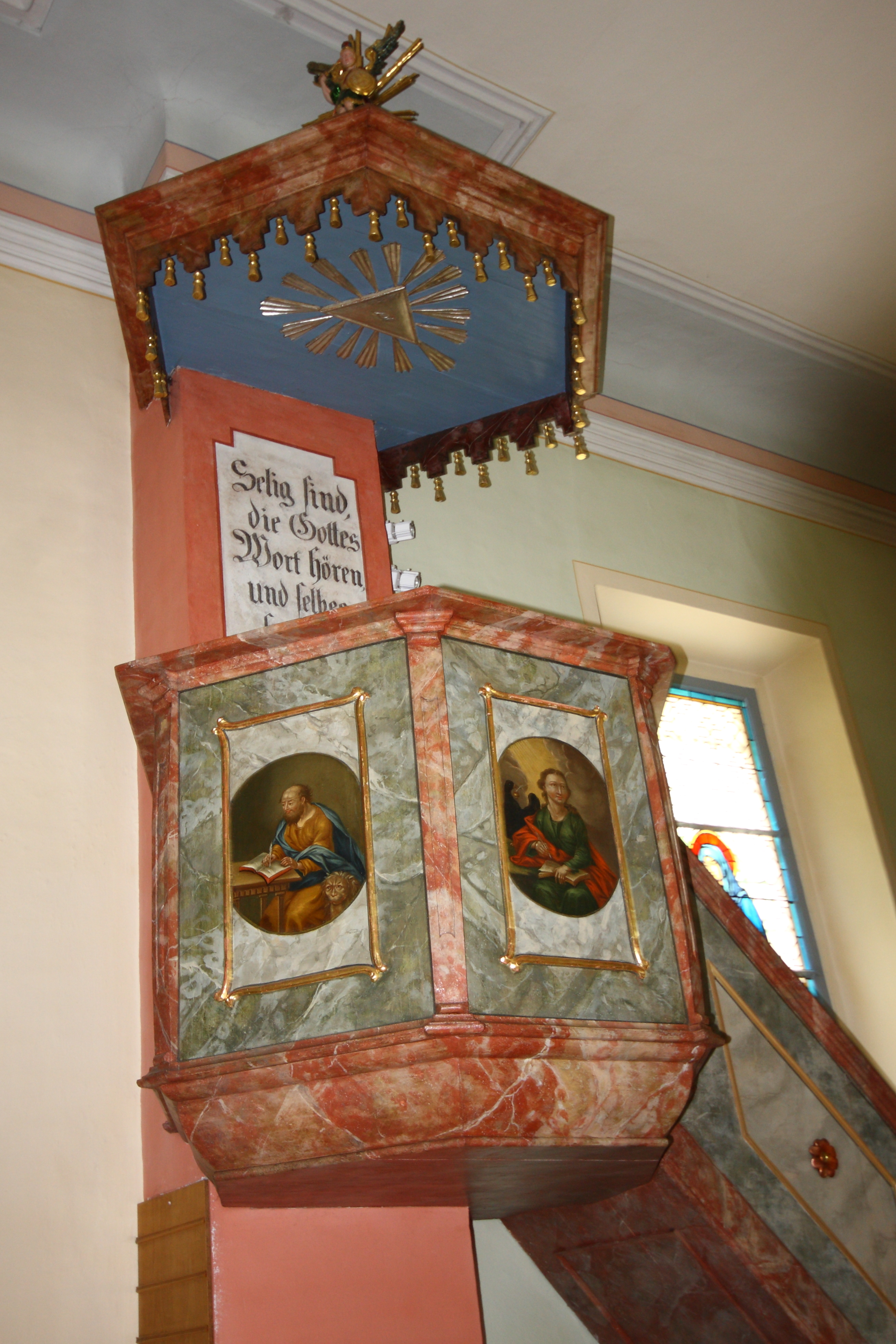

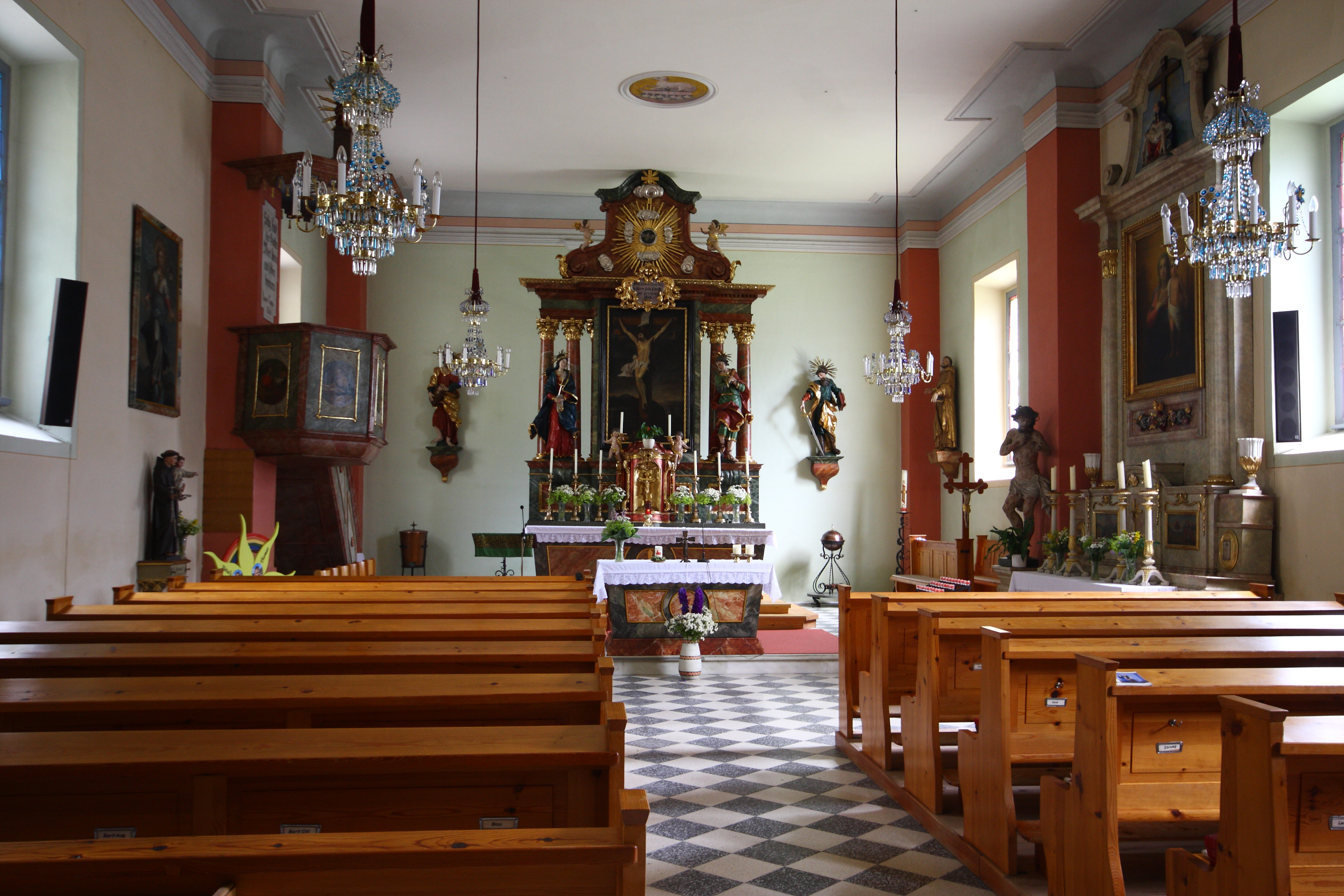

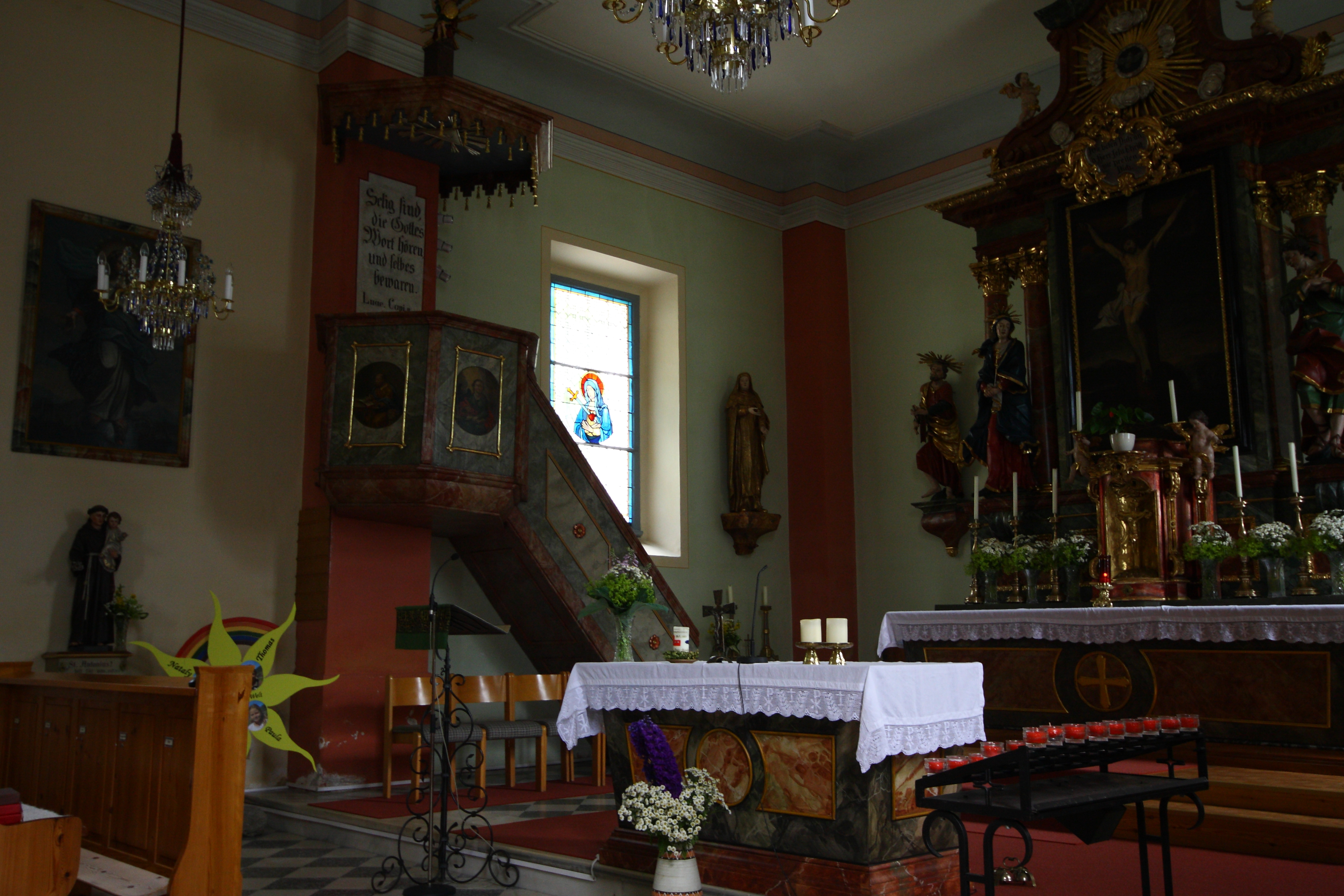

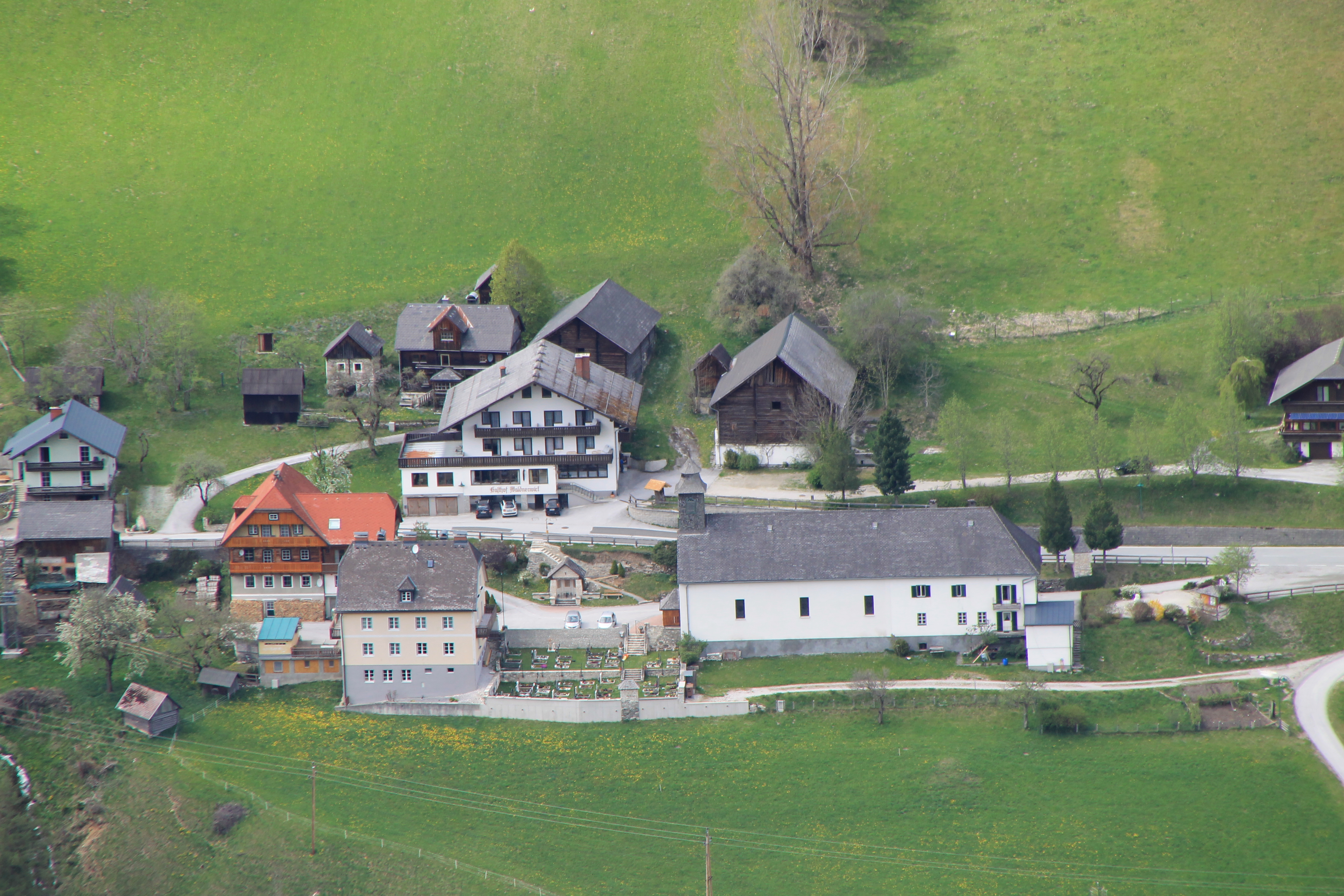
