= Sankt Nikolai im Sölktal =

- Former municipality
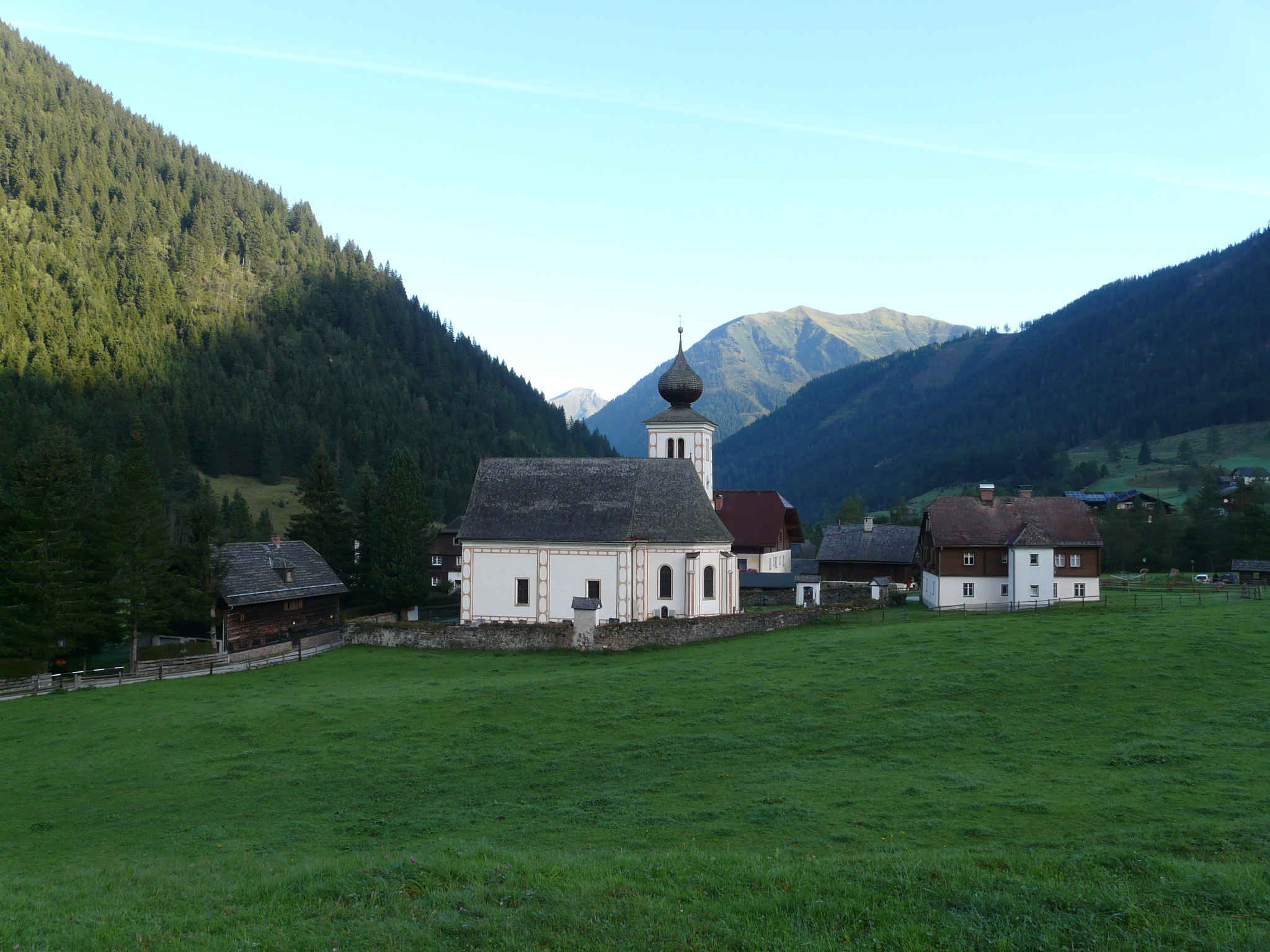
- View of Sankt Nikolai

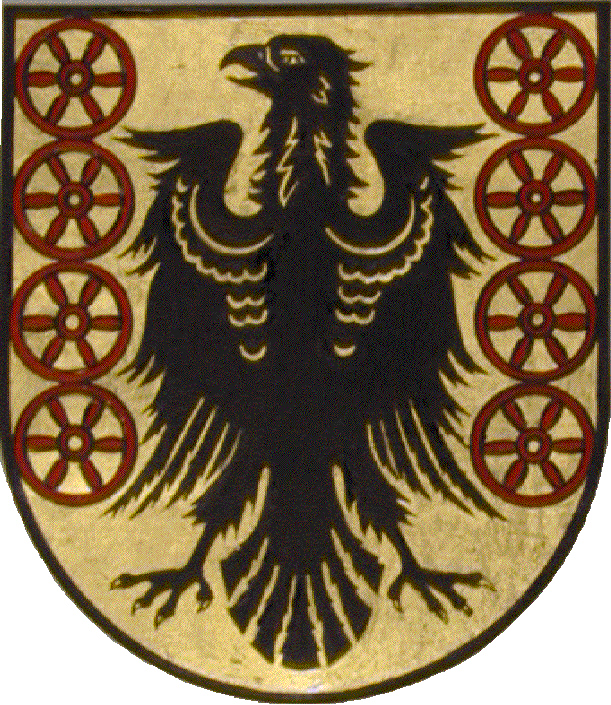
- Coat of arms

- Location within Austria
- Coordinates: 47°19′12″N 14°03′00″E
- Country: Austria
- State: Styria
- District: Liezen

Area
  - Total: 135.38 km^{2} (52.27 sq mi)
- Elevation: 1,023 m (3,356 ft)

Population (1 January 2016)
  - Total: 485
  - Density: 3.58/km^{2} (9.28/sq mi)
- Time zone: UTC+1 (CET)
  - Summer (DST): UTC+2 (CEST)
- Postal code: 8961
- Area code: 03689
- Vehicle registration: GB
- Website: www.st-nikolai.at

Sankt Nikolai im Sölktal is a former municipality in the district of Liezen in the Austrian state of Styria. Since the 2015 Styria municipal structural reform, it is part of the municipality Sölk.

== Geography ==
The municipality lies in the Sölktal Nature Park.
