= Stein an der Enns =

Coordinates: 47°26′N 13°56′E

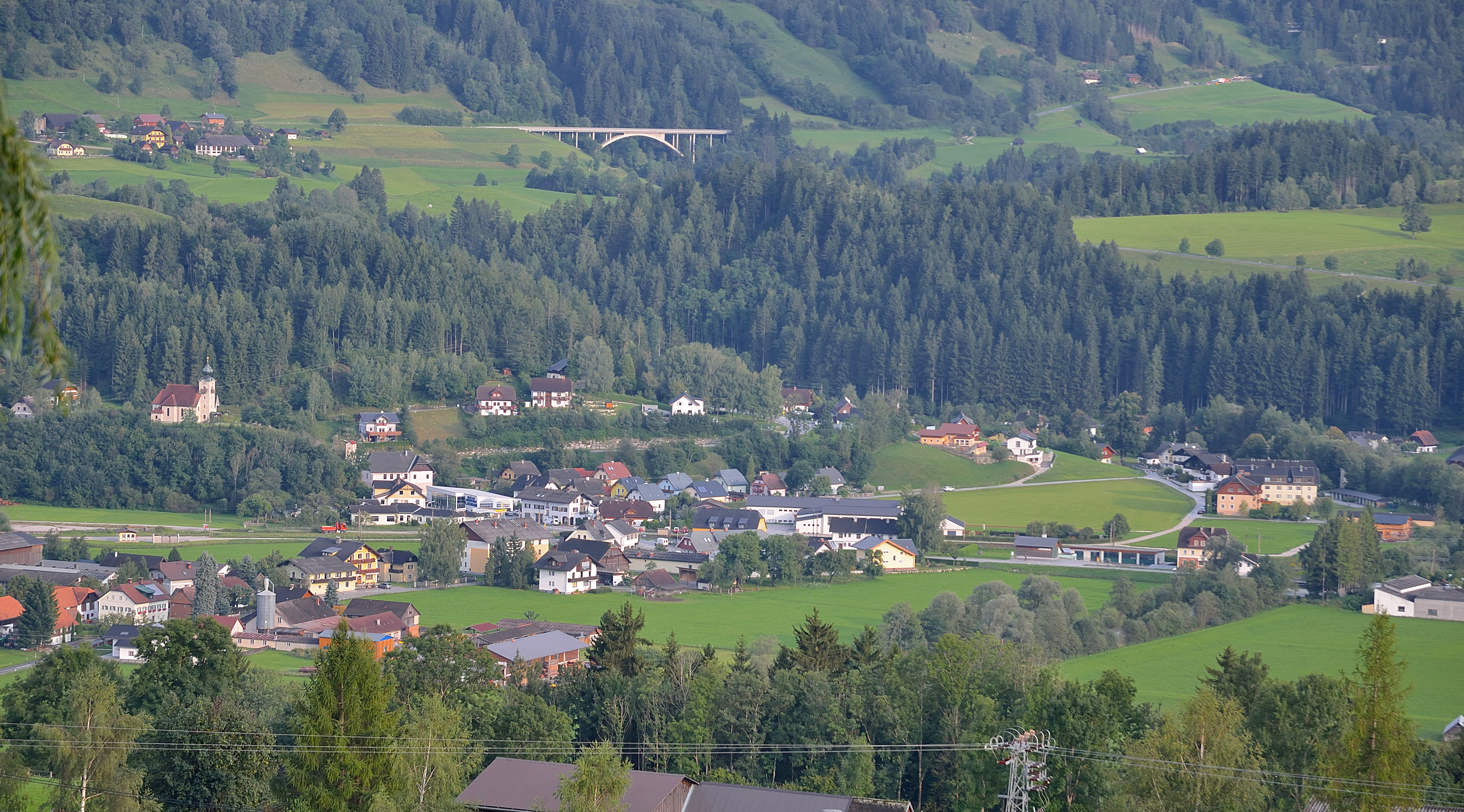
Stein an der Enns

Stein an der Enns is a village in the administrative district of Liezen, in the Austrian state of Styria. It is located in the valley of the river Enns, and part of the municipality Sölk.
