= Sölk =

- Municipality
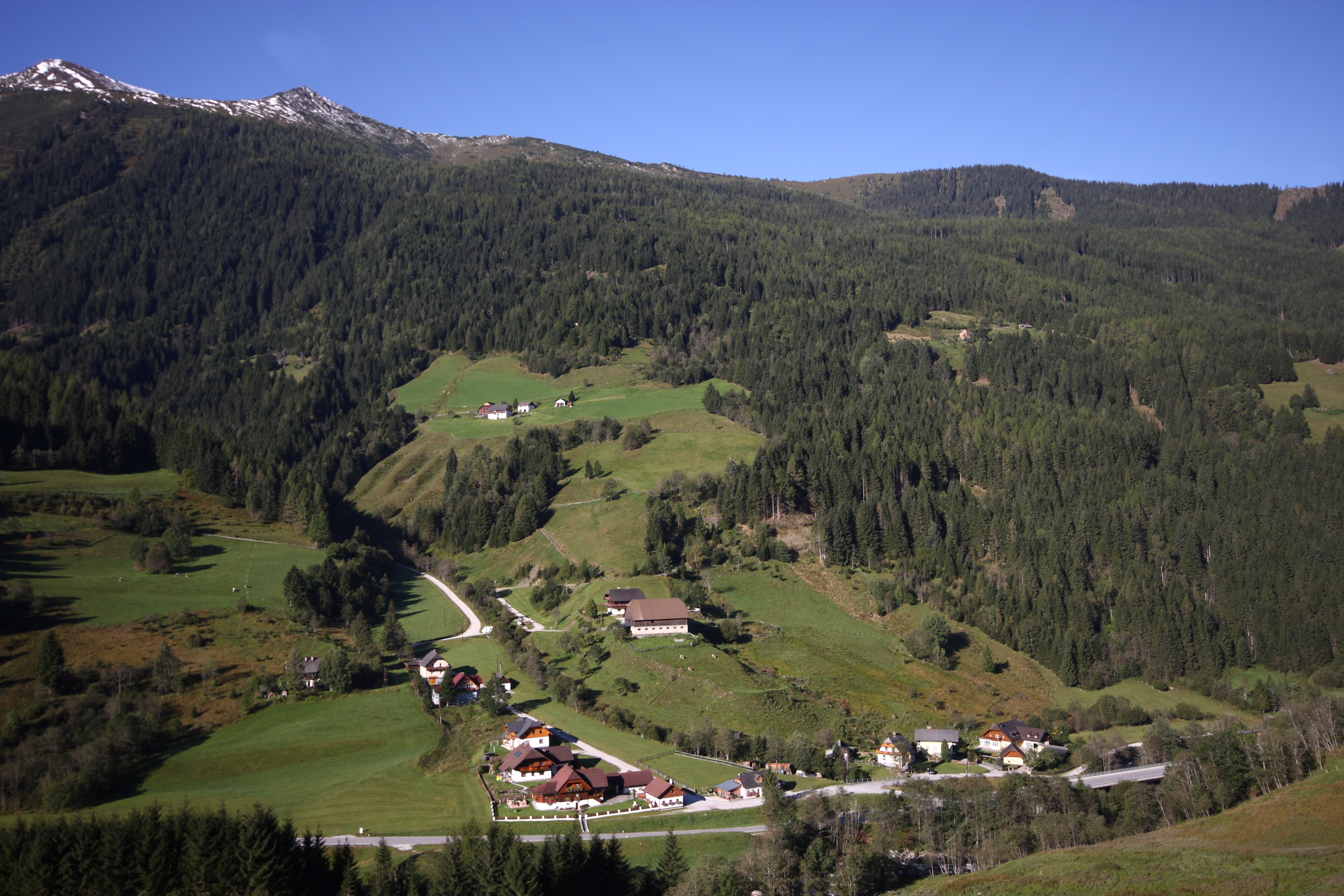
- Municipal part of Großsölk

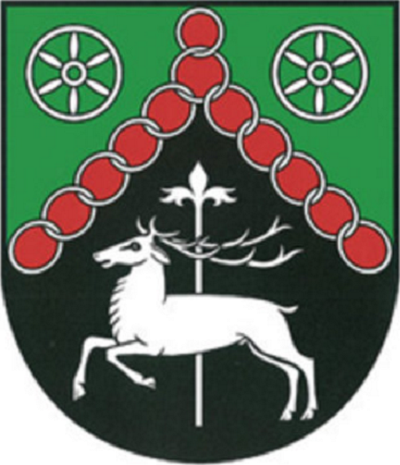
- Coat of arms

- Location within Austria
- Coordinates: 47°24′27″N 13°58′08″E
- Country: Austria
- State: Styria
- District: Liezen

Government
  - Mayor: Werner Schwab (ÖVP)

Area
  - Total: 288.65 km^{2} (111.45 sq mi)
- Elevation: 941 m (3,087 ft)

Population (2018-01-01)
  - Total: 1,494
  - Density: 5.176/km^{2} (13.41/sq mi)
- Time zone: UTC+1 (CET)
  - Summer (DST): UTC+2 (CEST)
- Postal code: 8961, 8962
- Area code: 03685
- Website: www.grosssoelk.at

Sölk is a municipality since 2015 in the Liezen District of Styria, Austria.

It was created as part of the Styria municipal structural reform, at the end of 2014, by merging the former independent towns Großsölk, Kleinsölk and Sankt Nikolai im Sölktal.

A complaint from the commune St. Nikolai im Sölktal, against merging, was introduced to the Constitutional Court, but was not successful.

The municipality of Sölk is area-wise the third-largest municipality in Styria (after Mariazell and Admont).

== Geography ==
=== The Sölktäler ===
The municipality territory of Sölk, these are the Talung of the Sölkbachs and its two headwaters (the Großsölkbach and Kleinsölkbach streams), are together called Sölktäler valleys. They branch at Stein an der Enns towards Gröbming from the Ennstal valley, and form the central incision in the Niedere Tauern. Especially the Großsölktal Valley, which for Sölkpass leads that separates Schladming Tauern west of the Rottenmann and Wölz Tauern east. Otherwise it is called here in the area on either side of the two Sölktäler of the Sölker Alps.

=== Municipality arrangement ===
The municipality territory includes the following three sections or Katastralgemeinden (areas 2015, populations as of January 2015):

- Großsölk (2,085.07 ha or 5,152.3 acres, 492)
- Kleinsölk (12,217.18 ha or 30,189.3 acres, 581)
- St. Nikolai (13,525.02 ha or 33,421.1 acres, 471)

== Coat of arms ==
The municipality of Sölk was granted the right to lead a municipal crest with the following description by the Steiermärkische Landesregierung with effect from 16 November 2015:

"In a 3-part shield divided by a red-underlaid silver chain in Göpel section, on either side on green a silver six-spoked wagonwheel, under in black a jumping silver stag, highlighted by a silver lily stalk."
