= Großsölk =

- Former municipality
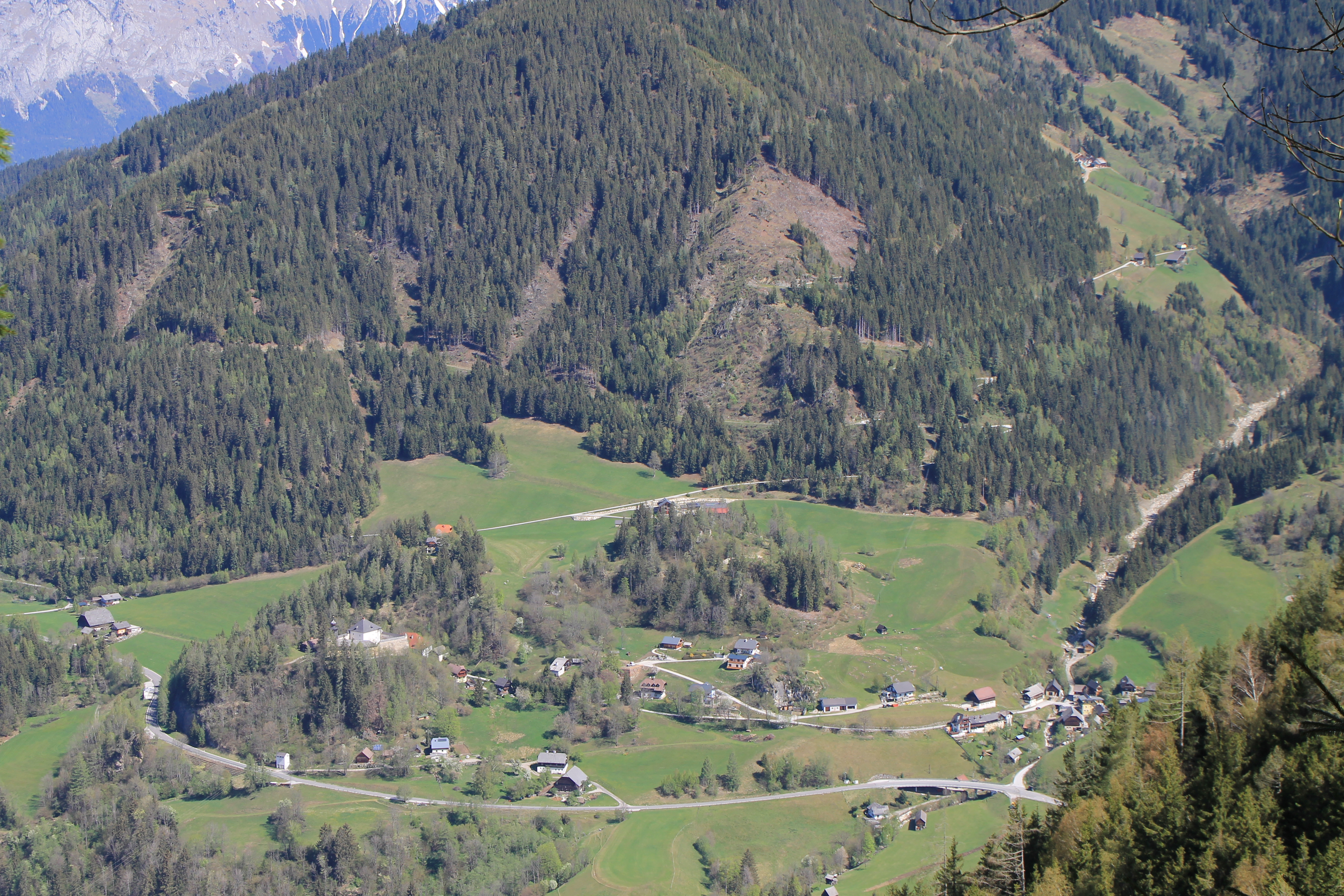
- View of Großsölk

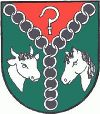
- Coat of arms

- Location within Austria
- Coordinates: 47°24′27″N 13°58′08″E
- Country: Austria
- State: Styria
- District: Liezen

Area
  - Total: 20.83 km^{2} (8.04 sq mi)
- Elevation: 694 m (2,277 ft)

Population (1 January 2016)
  - Total: 489
  - Density: 23.5/km^{2} (60.8/sq mi)
- Time zone: UTC+1 (CET)
  - Summer (DST): UTC+2 (CEST)
- Postal code: 8961
- Area code: 03685
- Vehicle registration: GB
- Website: www.grosssoelk.at

Großsölk is a former municipality in the district of Liezen in Styria, Austria. Since the 2015 Styria municipal structural reform, it is part of the municipality Sölk.
