= Tavella =

Italian surname

Tavella is an Italian family surname. The Tavella surname originated from Neapolitan or Old Italian tavella ‘board’, ‘plank’, ‘slab’ (from Latin tabella), presumably a nickname for someone who was tall and thin, or perhaps a metonymic occupational name for a woodworker. People with the surname include:

- Aylon Darwin Tavella (born 1992), Brazilian footballer
- Carlo Antonio Tavella, Italian painter
- Dominick Tavella, American sound engineer
- Julia Ann (born 1969), adult film actress, born Julia Tavella
- Franz Tavella (La Val, 10 October 1844 – Bressanone, 12 December 1931) was an Austrian master wood sculptor.
