= Sas dles Diesc =

Mountain in Italy

Zehner
- Sas dles Diesc
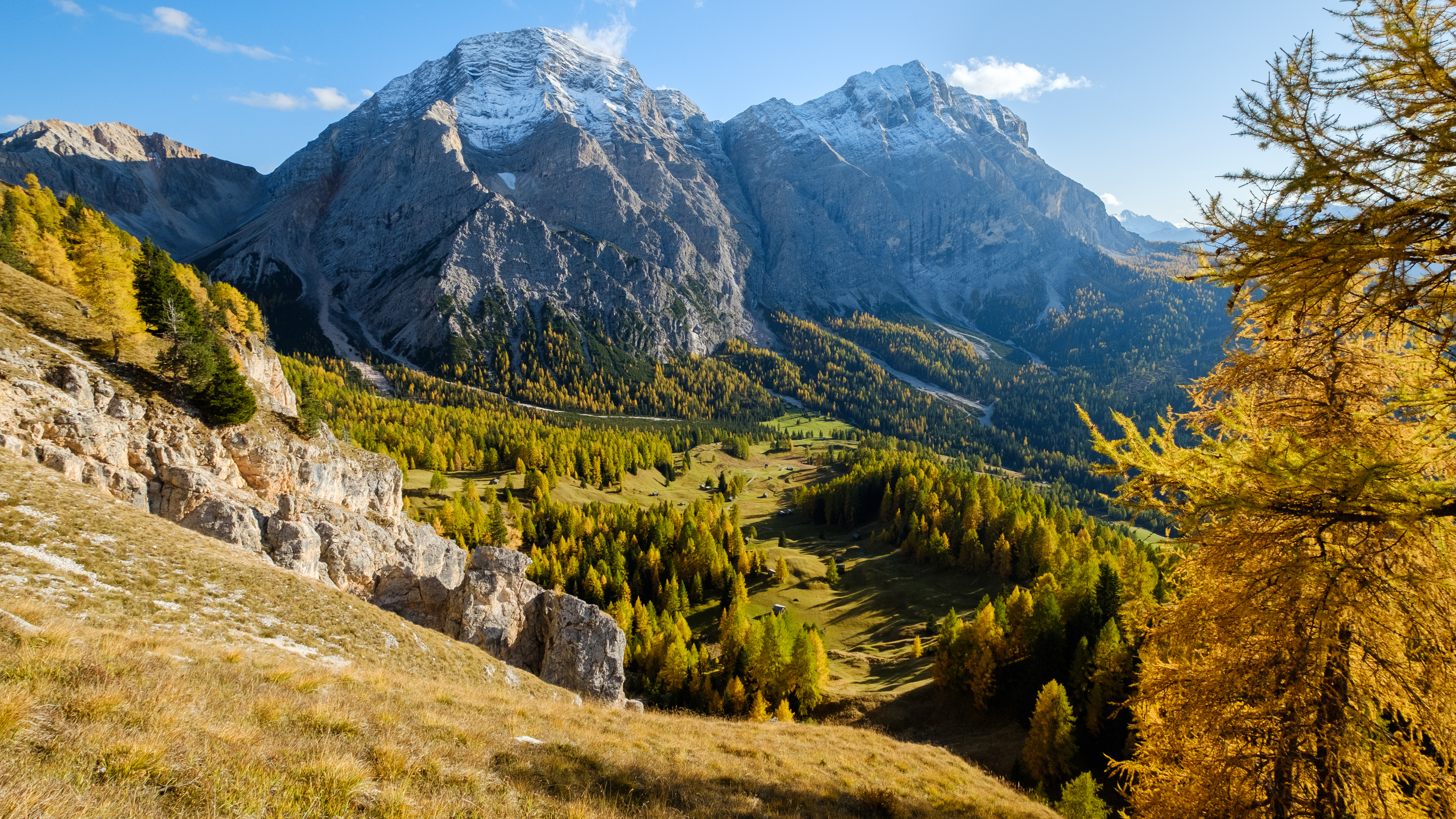
- Sas dles Nü (left) and Sas dles Diesc (right)

Highest point
- Elevation: 3,026 m (9,928 ft)
- Listing: Alpine mountains above 3000 m
- Coordinates: 46°37′20″N 11°57′40″E

Geography
- Location: South Tyrol, Italy
- Parent range: Dolomites

The Zehner (Ladin: Sas dles Diesc; Italian: Cima Dieci [ˈtʃiːma ˈdjɛːtʃi]) is a mountain near La Val in South Tyrol, Italy.
