= Sas dles Nü =

Mountain in Italy

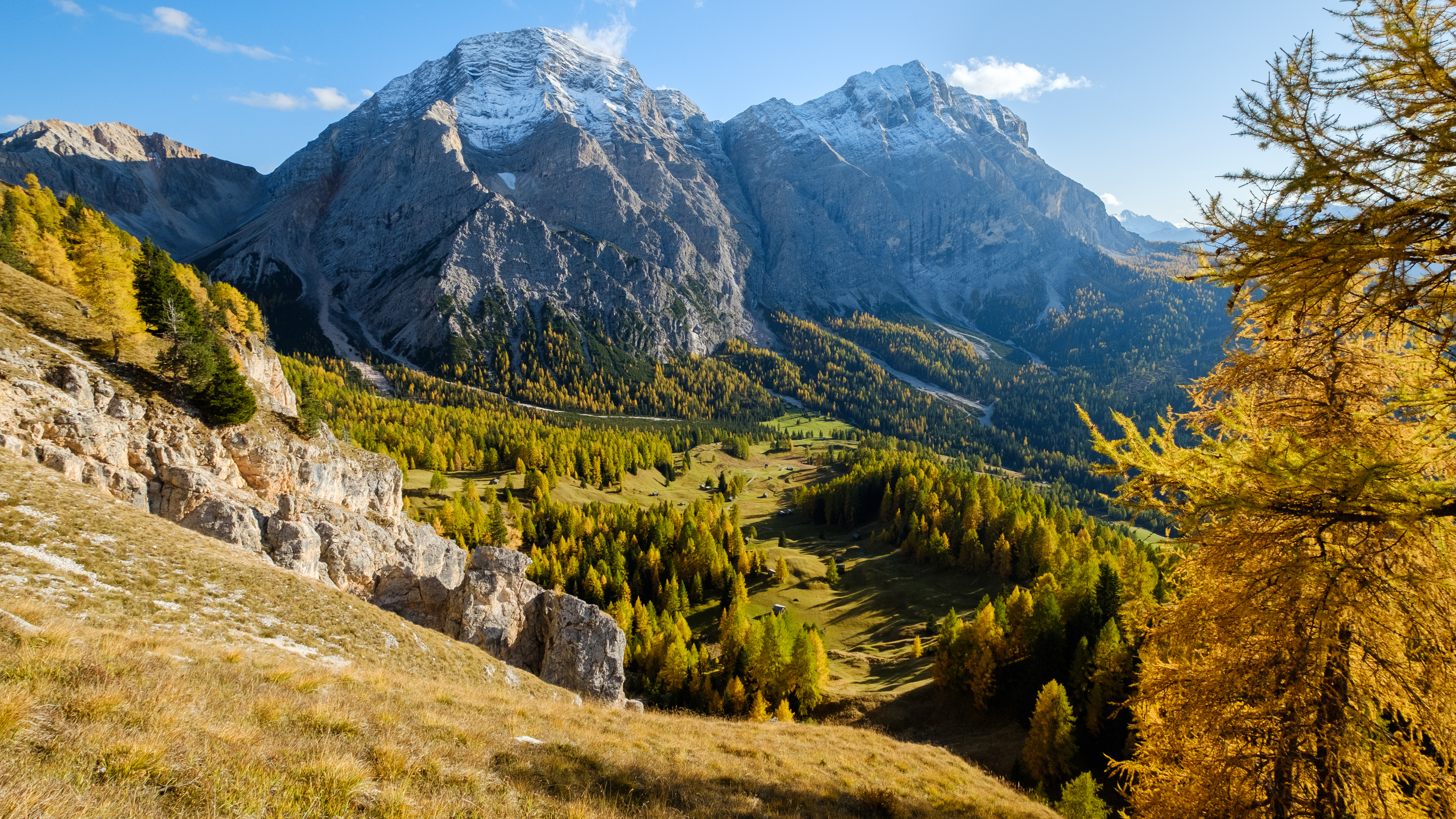
- Sas dles Nü (left) and Sas dles Diesc (right)

Highest point
- Elevation: 2,968 m (9,738 ft)
- Coordinates: 46°37′48″N 11°58′52″E

Geography
- Location: South Tyrol, Italy
- Parent range: Dolomites

The Sas dles Nü (German: Neuner; Italian: Cima Nove [ˈtʃiːma ˈnɔːve]) is a mountain in the Dolomites near La Val, South Tyrol, Italy.
