= Franz Tavella =

Italian sculptor (1844–1931)

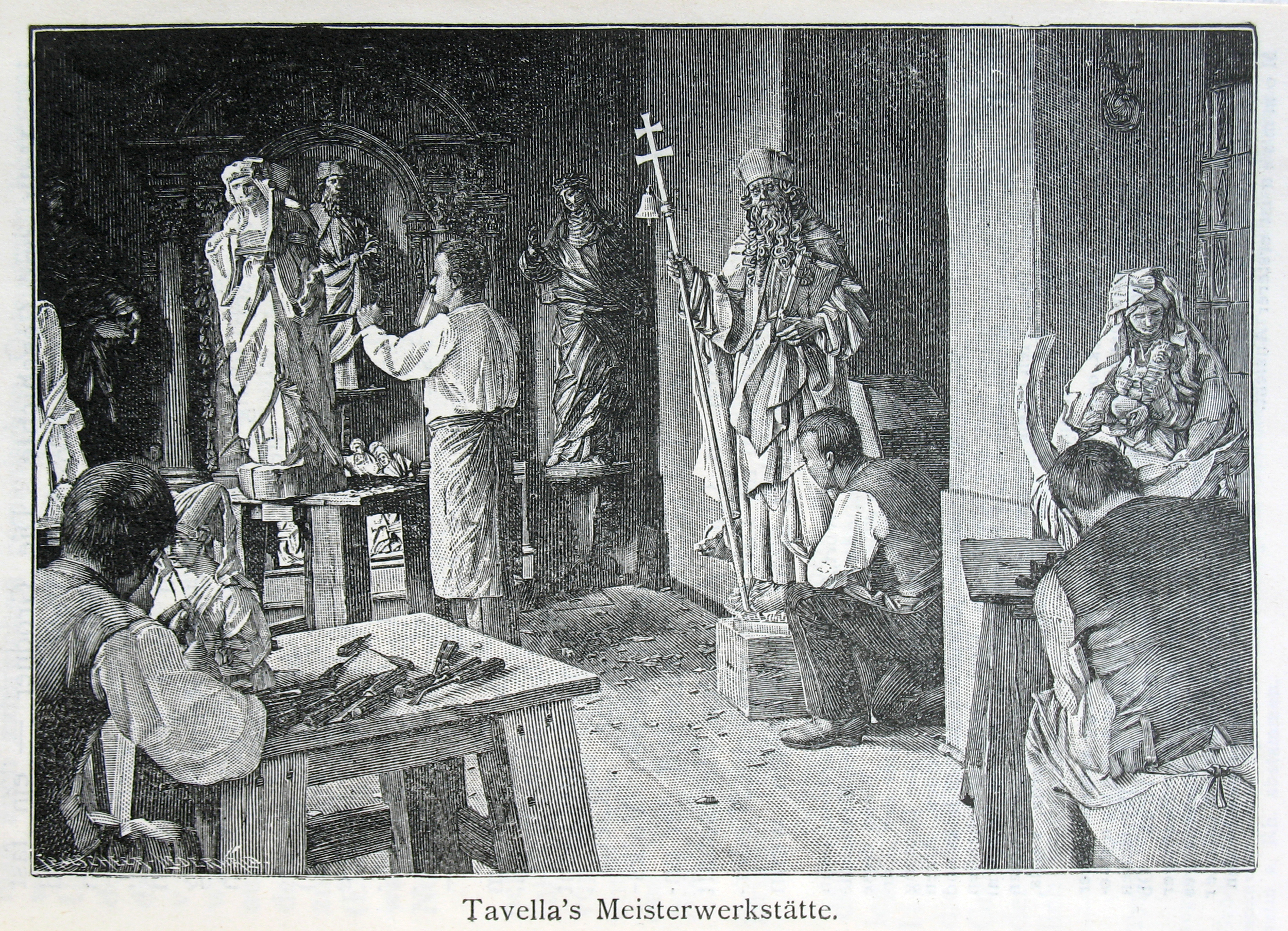
Tavella workshop

Franz Tavella (La Val, 10 October 1844 – Brixen, 18 December 1931) was a Ladin master wood sculptor active in the Austro-Hungarian Empire and the Kingdom of Italy.

== Biography ==
Franz Tavella was the son of Marianna Spisser and Filipp Tavella, who was a renowned wood sculptor as well. Franz during his youth worked under his father as a regular carpenter. At a later time he moved to Val Gardena, where the founder of the school of art of Urtijëi in Val Gardena, Ferdinand Demetz, noticed his artistic talent and decided to take him as a pupil teaching him the art wood carving. After a few years Tavarella moved to Vienna, where for two years he attended the Academy of Fine Arts, his main mentor was Professor König.

In 1895 in Innsbruck he was given an award for his statue representing Saint Anne and the holy virgin Mary, which is now kept in the church of Pieve di Livinallongo. In 1897 he was given an award in Bolzano and in 1900 in Paris at the world exposition for his Pietà, nowadays kept in the chapel of the public cemetery of Brixen.

In his workshop in Ortisei he tutored many renowned sculptors including Johann Baptist Moroder-Lusenberg, Rudolf Moroder, Ludwig Moroder from Urtijëi and Valentin Gallmetzer from Klausen.

In 1905 Tavella moved to Brixen, where he died in poverty and sickness.

== Renowned works ==
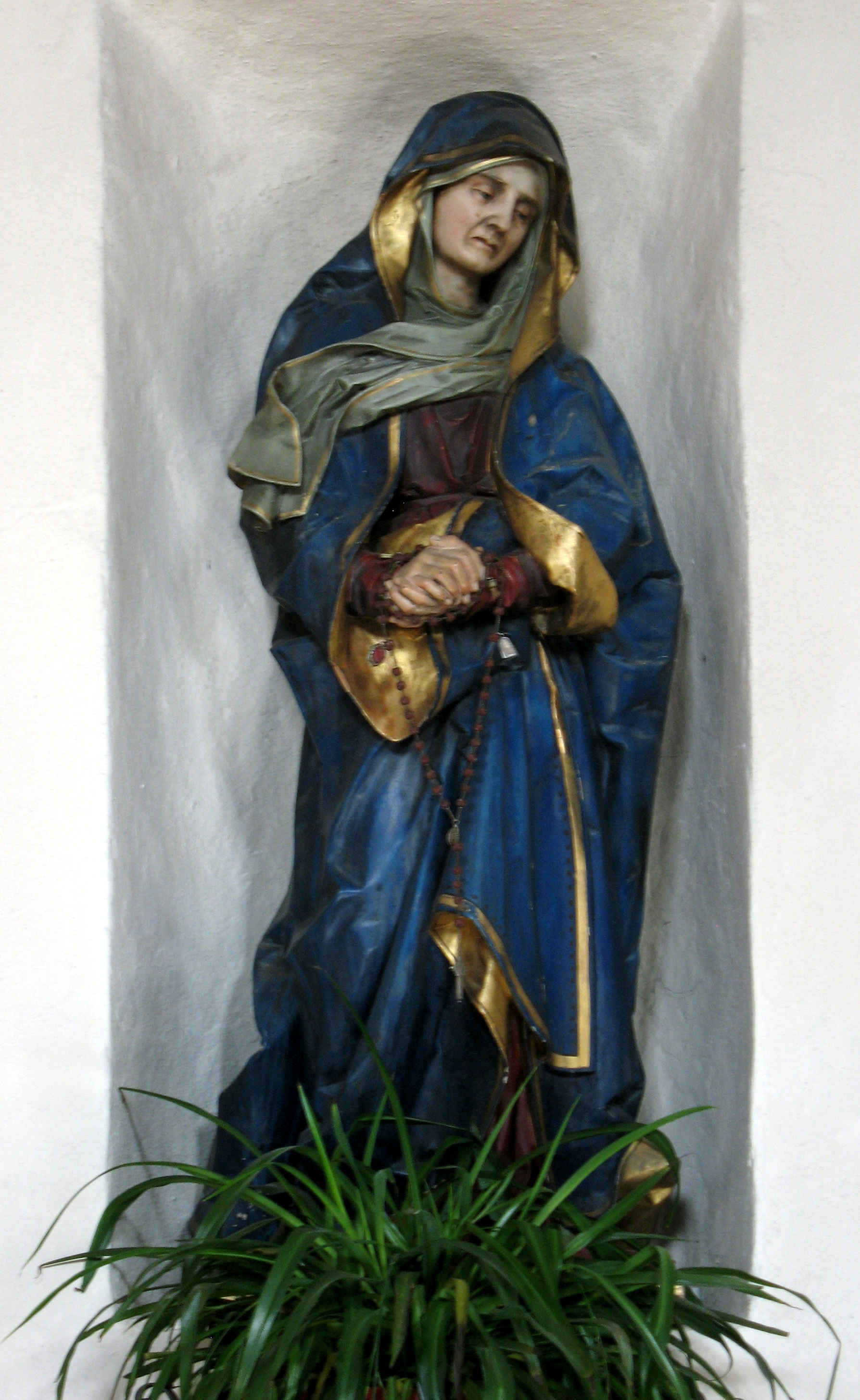
Sant'Anna in the church of Colma (Barbiano)

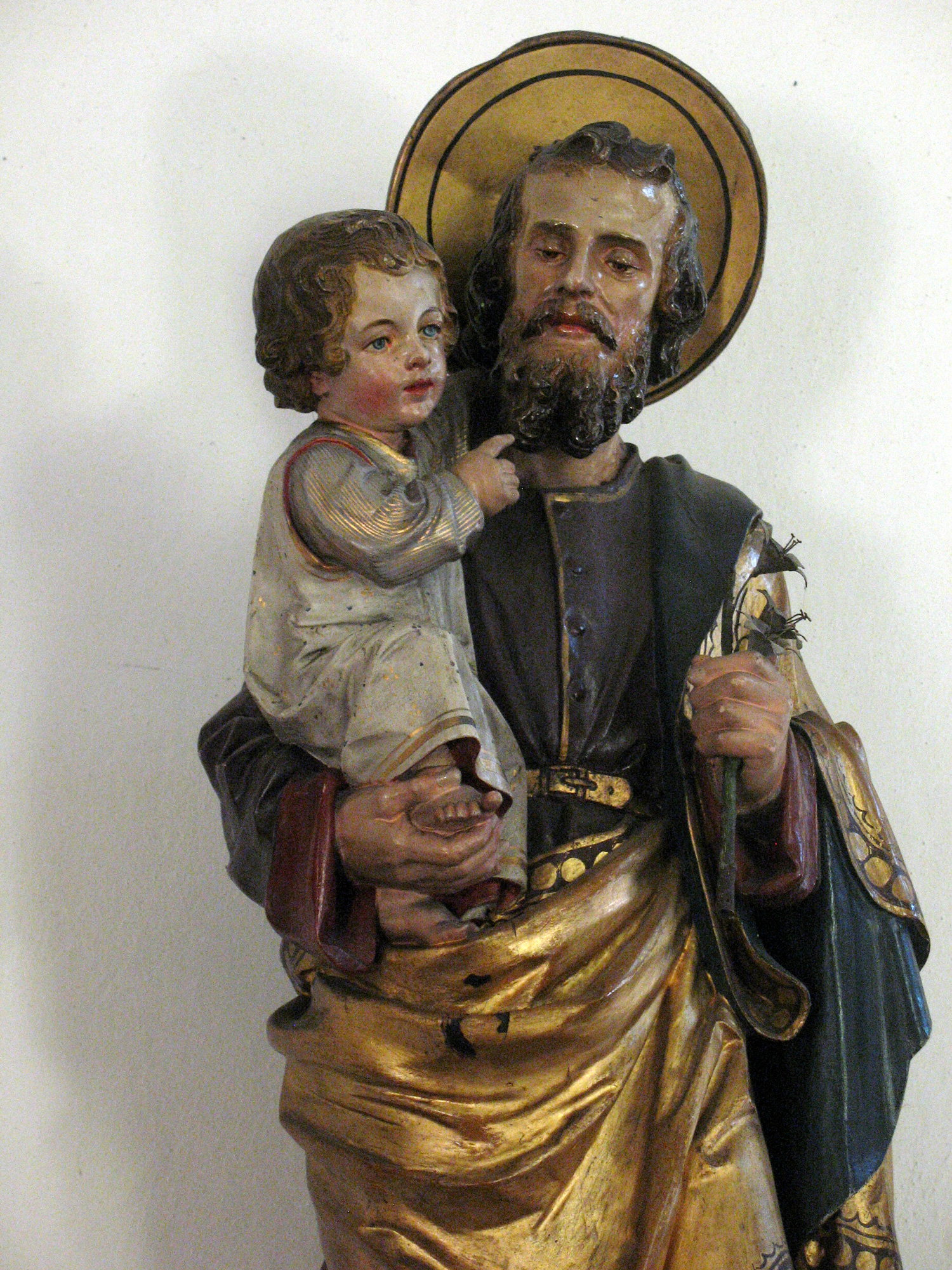
Saint Joseph in Campodazzo/Renon

=== In the province of Bolzano ===
- Bolzano, church of Francescani, Saint Joseph.

he sculpted a wooden statue of Saint Magdalen for the Ca'de Bezzi Family.

- Kollmann, Parochial Church, several statues.
- Atzwang, Saint Joseph's parochial church, the group of the rosary 1905.
- Lengstein (Ritten), parochial church, saints on the altars 1885; queen of the rosary, procession.
- Tramin - Söll, the church of S. Maurice, Virgin with baby Jesus on the altar.
- St. Felix parochial church.
- Tiers, parochial church of St. George, Saint George, Saint Elizabeth and Sant'Agnese 1906 (facade)
- Brixen, graveyard, Pietà.
- Gsies, the church of St. Magdalena, Pietà.
- Sterzing, iron soldier- his shield was designed by Prof. H. Lach.

==== Ladinia ====
- Pieve di Livinallongo, Sant'Anna and the holy virgin.
- Badia, Sant'Anna.
- La Val, the heart of Jesus.
- La Val, Pidrô, chapel, virgin and Bernadetta in the cave.
- Badia, S. Croce sanctuary: two medallions with the Pietà and the Getsemani.
- La Ila, parochial church, virgin with the holy child.
- La Pli de Mareo parochial church, San Giuseppe, Sant'Anna and Mary.
- Cadin-Ampezzo, chapel of the virgin of well being, sculpture in granite.

=== Other regions ===
- Castelnuovo, the church of Santa Margherita, statue of Santa Margherita on the main altar.
  - Parrocchiale of San Leonardo, Virgin of the Rosary 1894.
- Borgo Valsugana, the nativity, virgin of the rosary.
- Sovere church of San Martino vescovo: redeeming christ 1901

=== Abroad ===
- Brazil, Chácara Nazareth: Sagrado Coração de Jesus - Igreja dos Frades. several works.
- Brandenburg church of Teltow. Altar with cross.

== Images ==
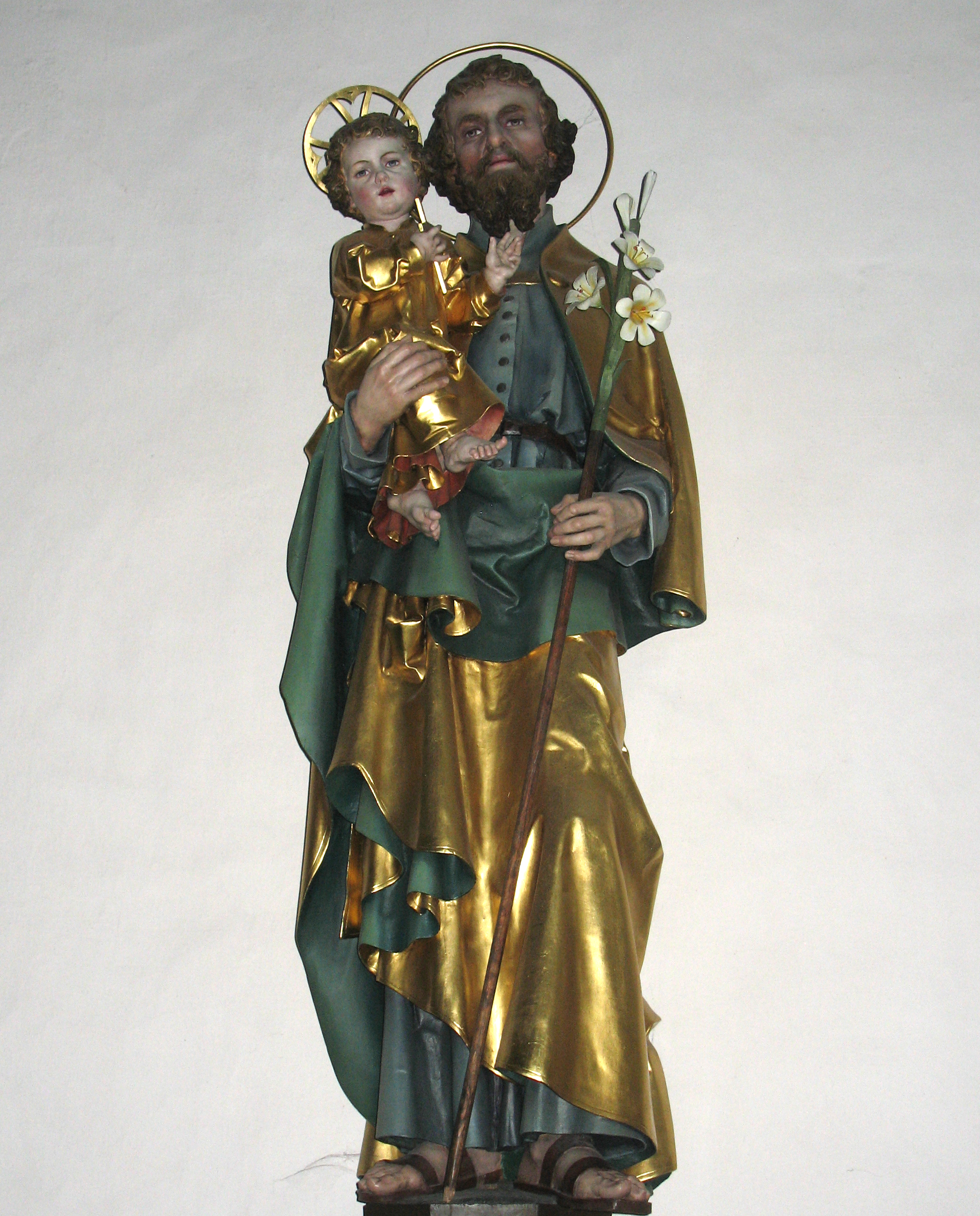
Saint Joseph in the church of Francescani in Bolzano

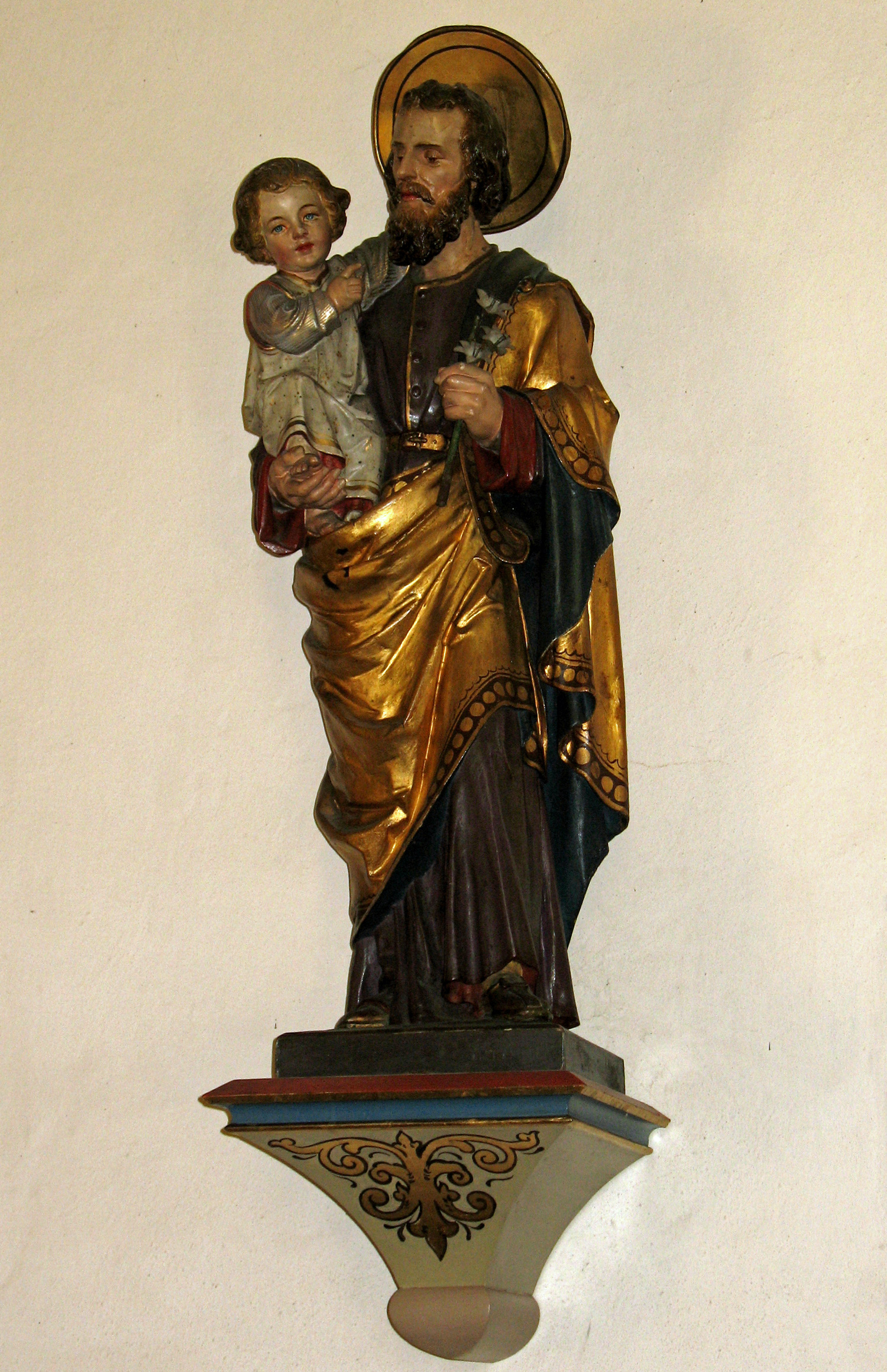
Saint Joseph in the church of Campodazzo/Renon

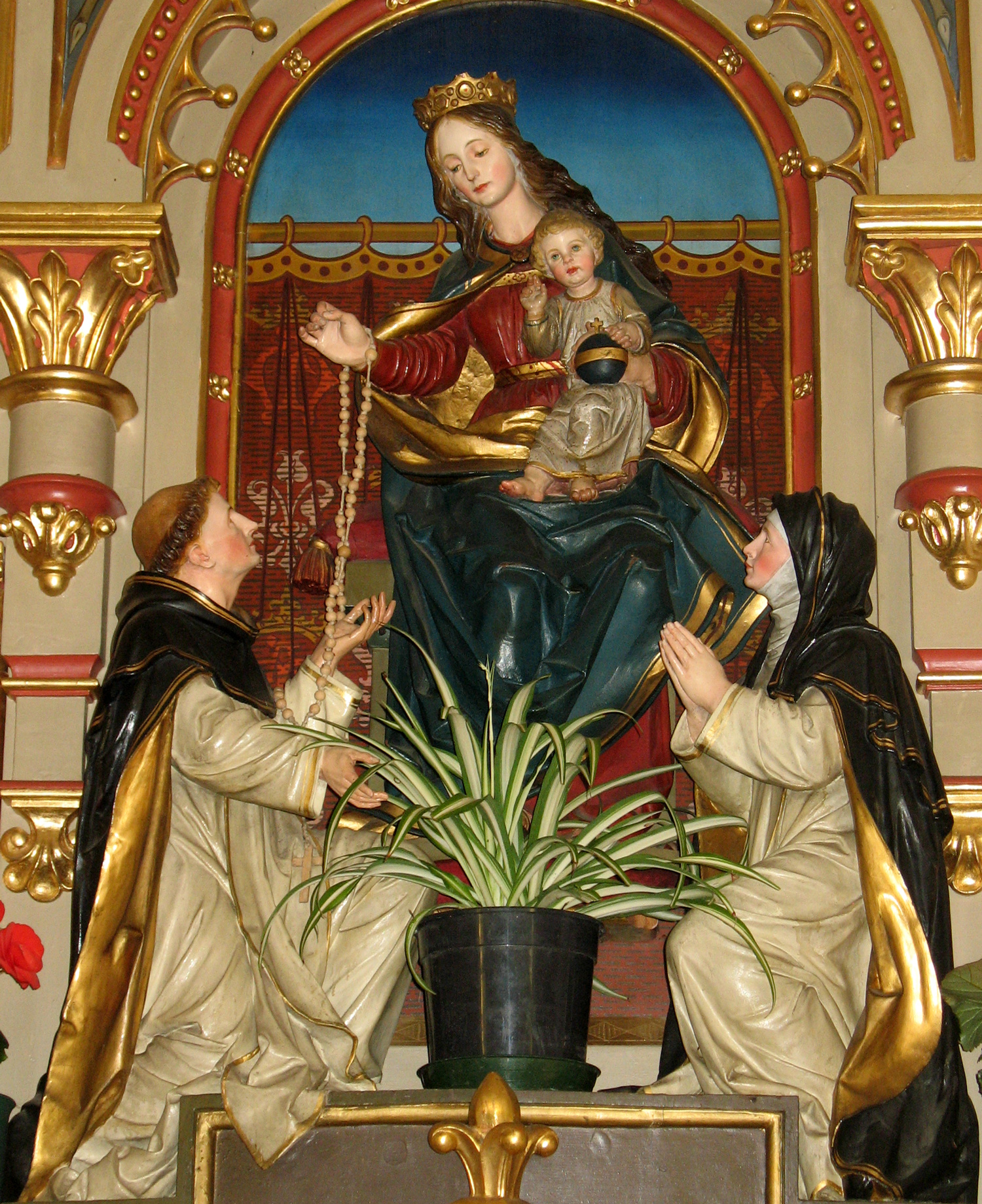
the virgin of the rosary in the church of Campodazzo/Renon
