= Valentin Gallmetzer =

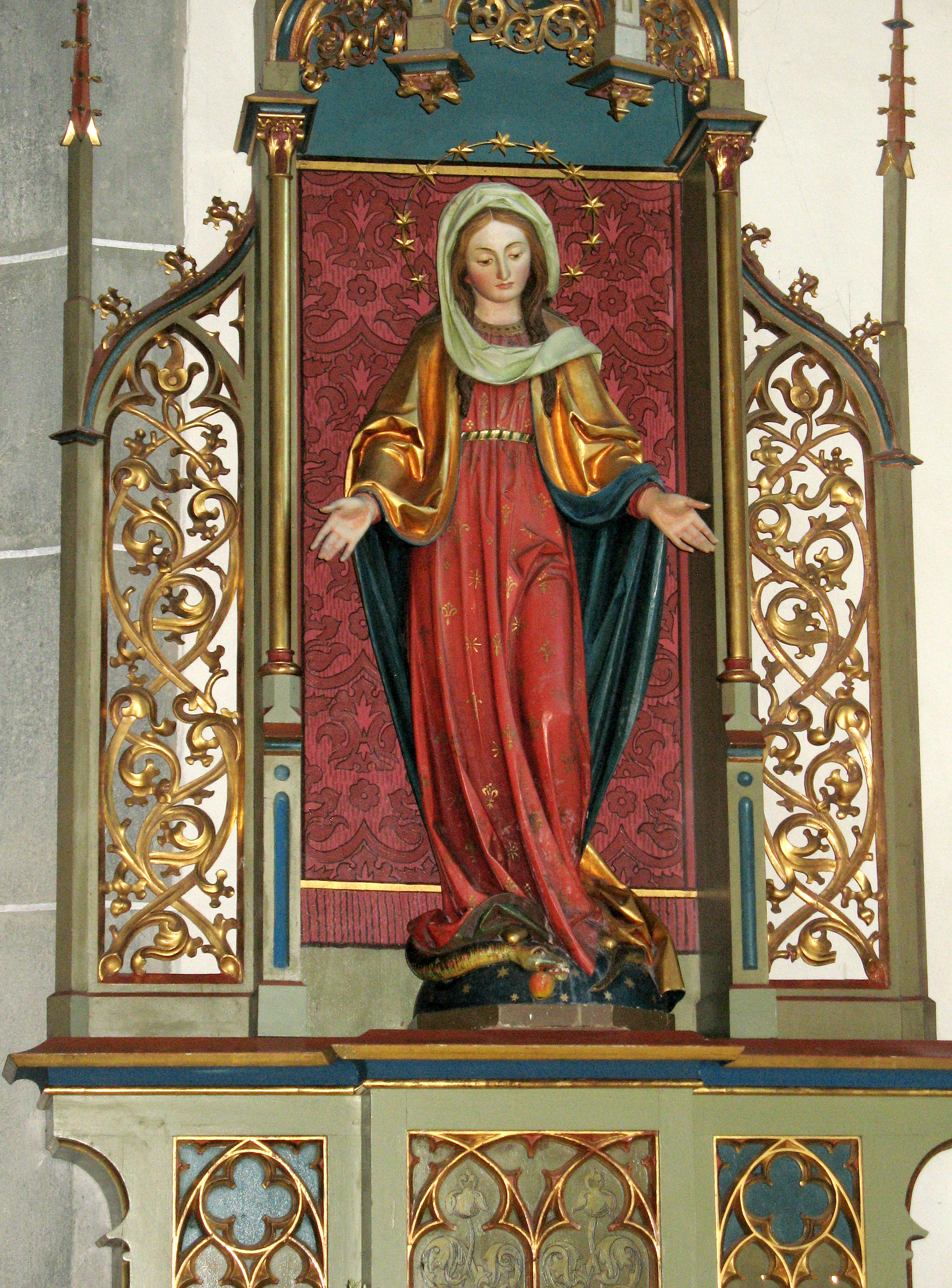
A statue of Virgin Mary in Lajen, created by Valentin Gallmetzer.

Valentin Gallmetzer (February 9, 1870, Obereggen, Deutschnofen – January 16, 1958, Klausen) was a Tyrolean gothic revival sculptor, a pupil of Franz Tavella. In 1901 he entered the Academy of Fine Arts in Munich. Many of his works decorate churches in South Tyrol.

For many years he had been the Burgomaster of Klausen.

== Works ==
- 1908: Altar of the sacred heart of Jesus. Bolzano, Abbey of Muri-Gries.
- 1910: Statues of the Virgin Mary and of Saint John. Marlengo, Pfarrkirche.
- 1917: Statue of Saint Martin. Nova Ponente.

== Literature ==
- Hölzl Stifter, Maria; Heiss, Hans; Dorfmann, Walther: Valentin Gallmetzer. Kunstmonografie. Athesia, Bozen, 2008. ISBN 978-88-8266-311-7
