= La Val =

- Comune
- Comun de La Val; Comune di La Valle; Gemeinde Wengen
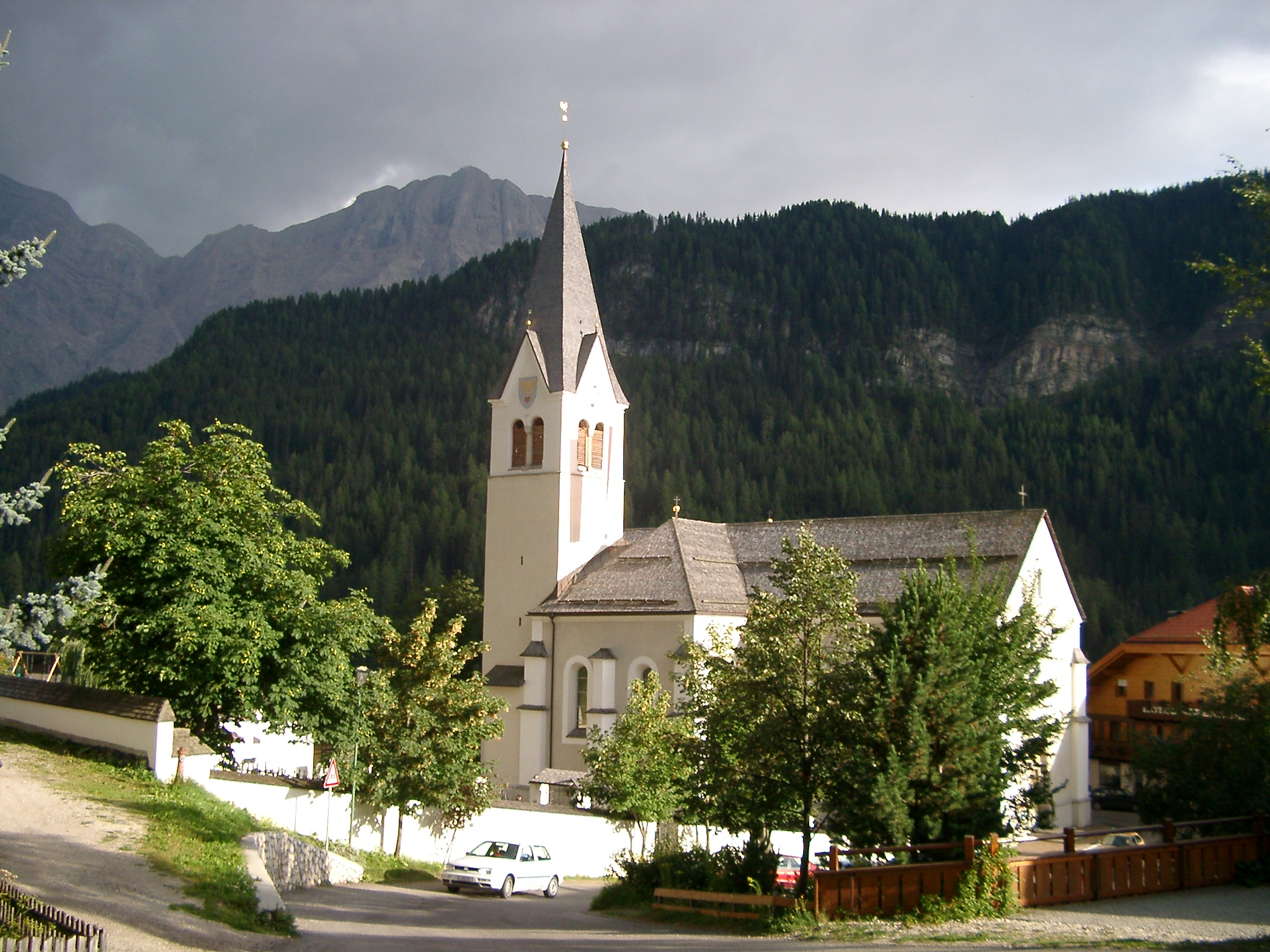
- View of La Val

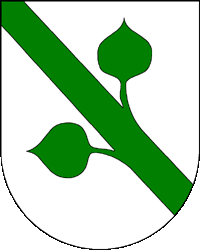
- Coat of arms

- Location within Italy Location within Trentino-Alto Adige/Südtirol
- Coordinates: 46°39′31″N 11°55′30″E
- Country: Italy
- Region: Trentino-Alto Adige/Südtirol
- Province: South Tyrol (BZ)

Government
  - Mayor: Felix Nagler

Area
  - Total: 39.0 km^{2} (15.1 sq mi)

Population (Nov. 2010)
  - Total: 1,307
  - Density: 33.5/km^{2} (86.8/sq mi)
- Demonym(s): Italian: badiotti German: Wengener
- Time zone: UTC+1 (CET)
  - Summer (DST): UTC+2 (CEST)
- Postal code: 39030
- Dialing code: 0471
- Patron saint: St. Genesius
- Saint day: August 25
- Website: Official website

La Val (Italian: La Valle [la ˈvalle]; German: Wengen [ˈvɛŋən]) is a comune (municipality) in the province of South Tyrol in northern Italy, located about 45 kilometres (28 mi) northeast of the city of Bolzano.

== Geography ==
As of 30 November 2010, it had a population of 1,307 and an area of 39.0 square kilometres (15.1 mi^{2}).

== History ==
=== Coat-of-arms ===
The emblem consists of a vert branch, placed on bend, with two leaves on argent, it is the emblem of the family Rü. The emblem was adopted in 1969.

== Society ==
=== Linguistic distribution ===
According to the 2024 census, 96.45% of the population speak Ladin, 1.70% Italian and 1.85% German as first language.

=== Demographic evolution ===
Historical population

Year	Pop.	±%
1861	?	—
1871	?	—
1881	?	—
1901	?	—
1911	?	—

Year	Pop.	±%
1921	730	—
1931	734	+0.5%
1936	754	+2.7%
1951	864	+14.6%
1961	958	+10.9%

Year	Pop.	±%
1971	1,069	+11.6%
1981	1,143	+6.9%
1991	1,199	+4.9%
2001	1,232	+2.8%

Source: Data from ISTAT

== Tourism ==
In tourist centers people also speak some English. The religion is Roman Catholic.

Tourism (hiking, mountain climbing, mountain biking) is a mainstay of the local economy as is agriculture. There is no locally-centered ski tourism, but in winter shuttle buses transport tourists to the nearby ski resorts such as Alta Badia. Tourism usually peaks in the winter months due to the comunes' location and attractions.

Whereas in earlier decades the agricultural economy was, to a large degree, self-sufficient, it has become, meanwhile, more of a monoculture based on cattle.

Down the valley at the Gran Ega river in Pederoa is a handicraft and industrial zone (shoes, textiles).

La Val (Wengen) borders the following municipalities: Badia, Mareo and San Martin de Tor.

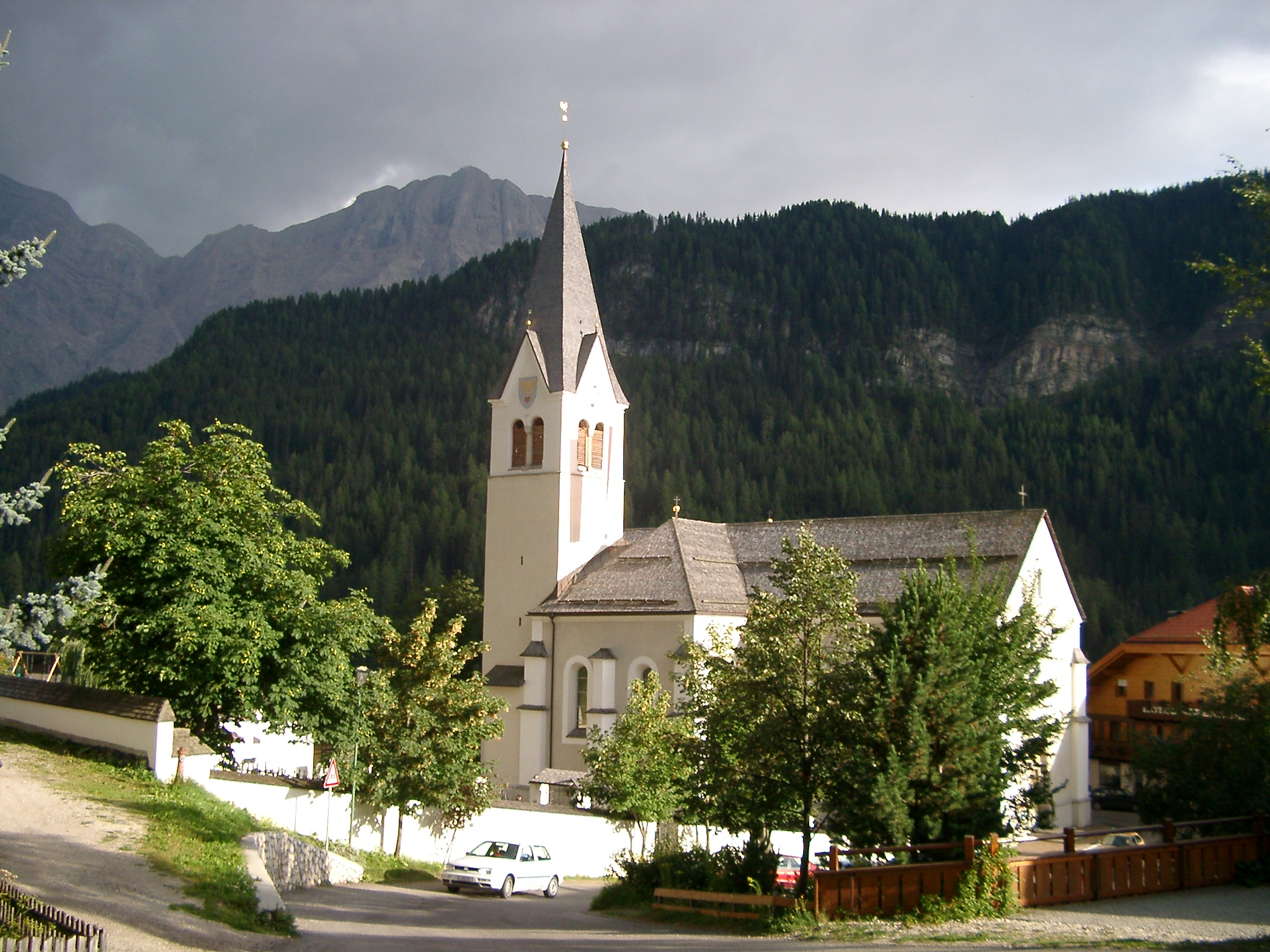
Main Church St. Jenesius

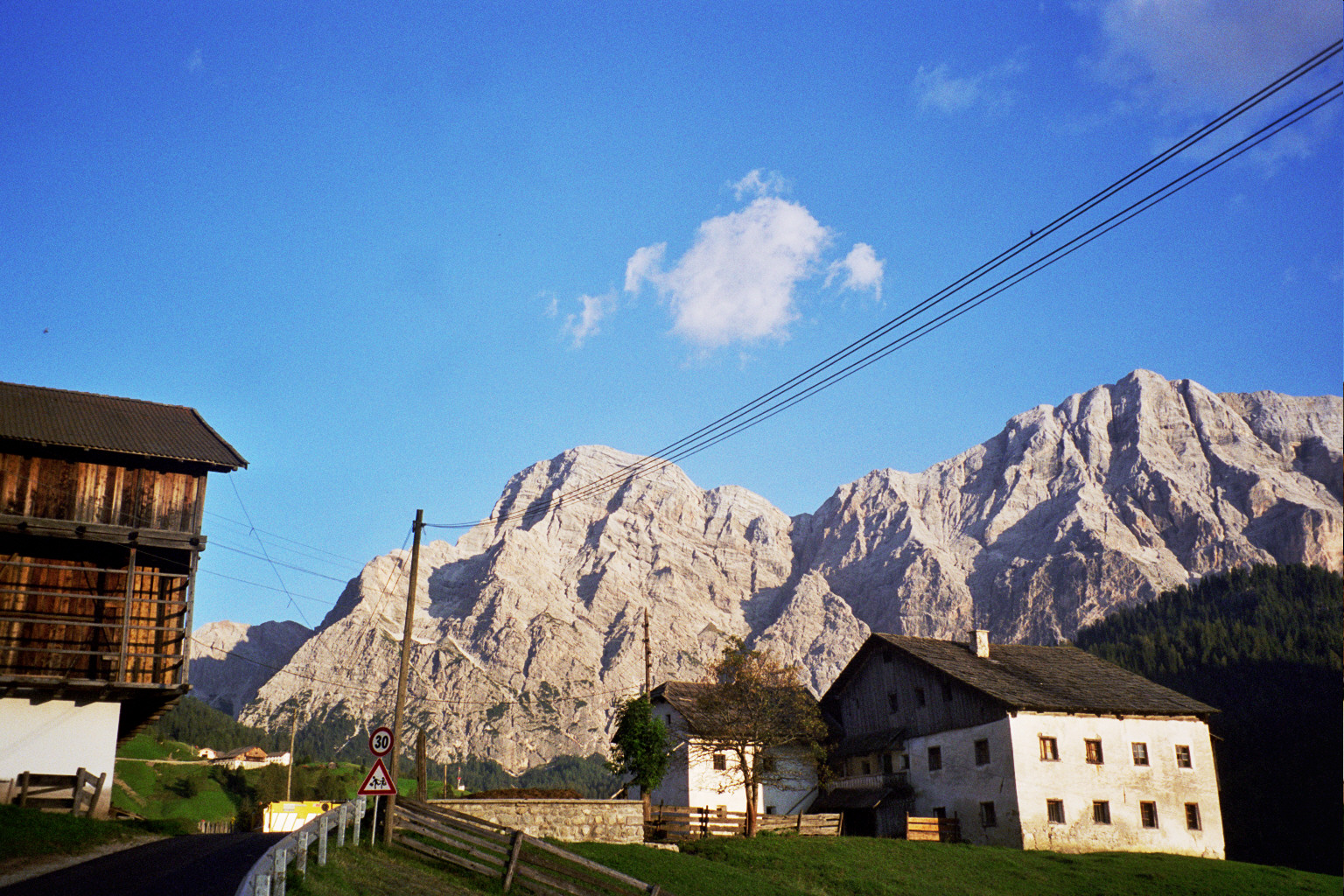
empty old house in Miribun

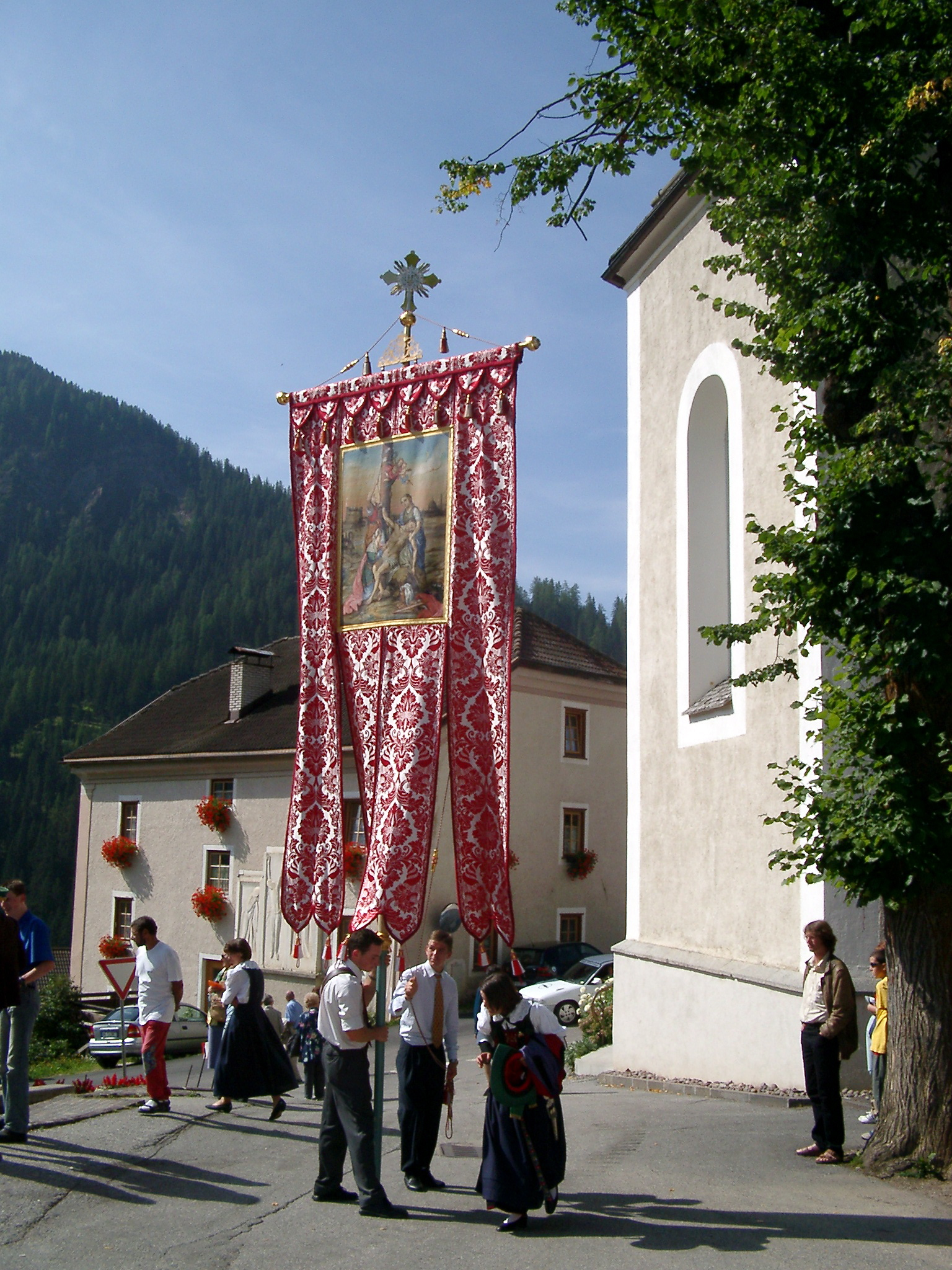
Religious Procession

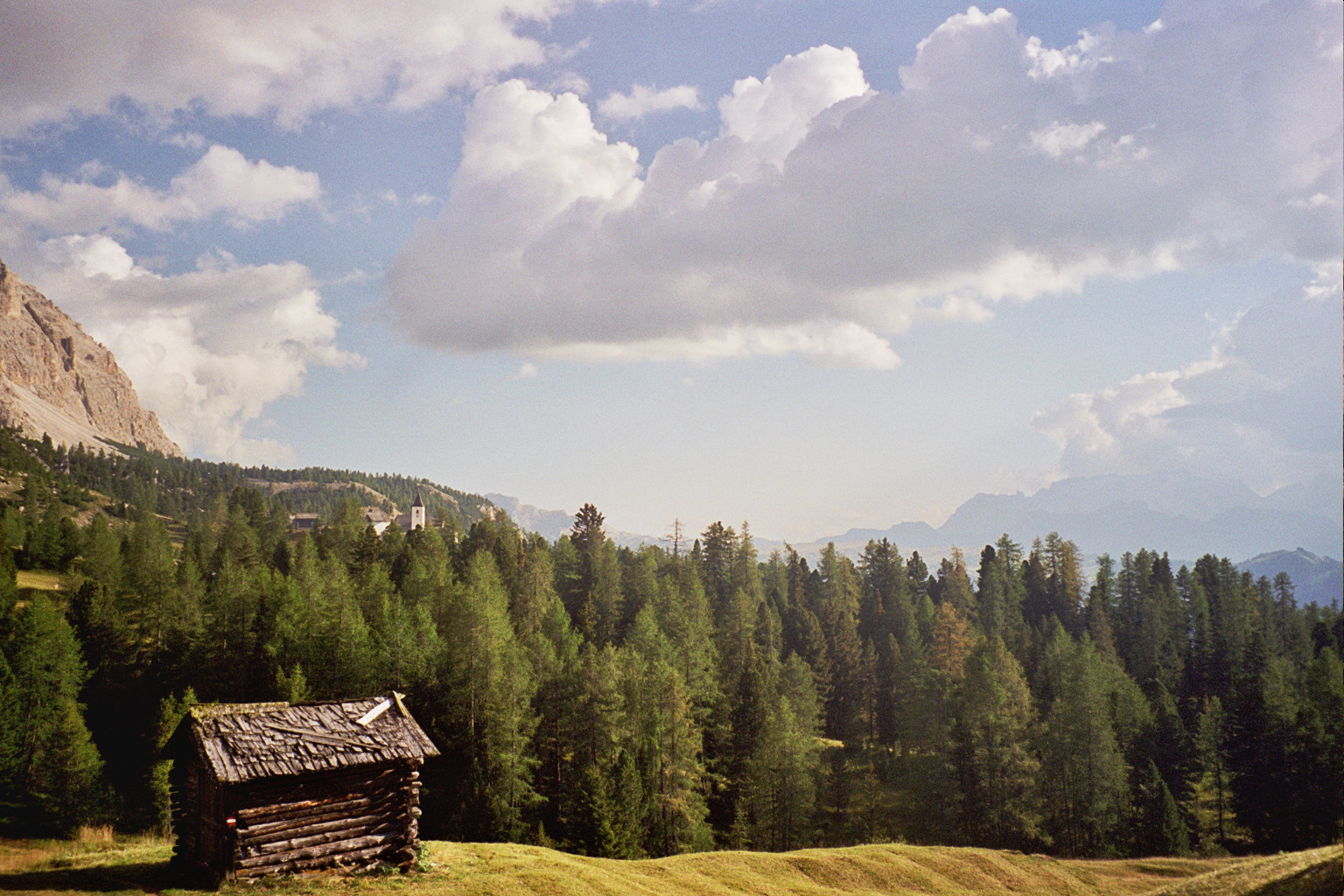
Armentara

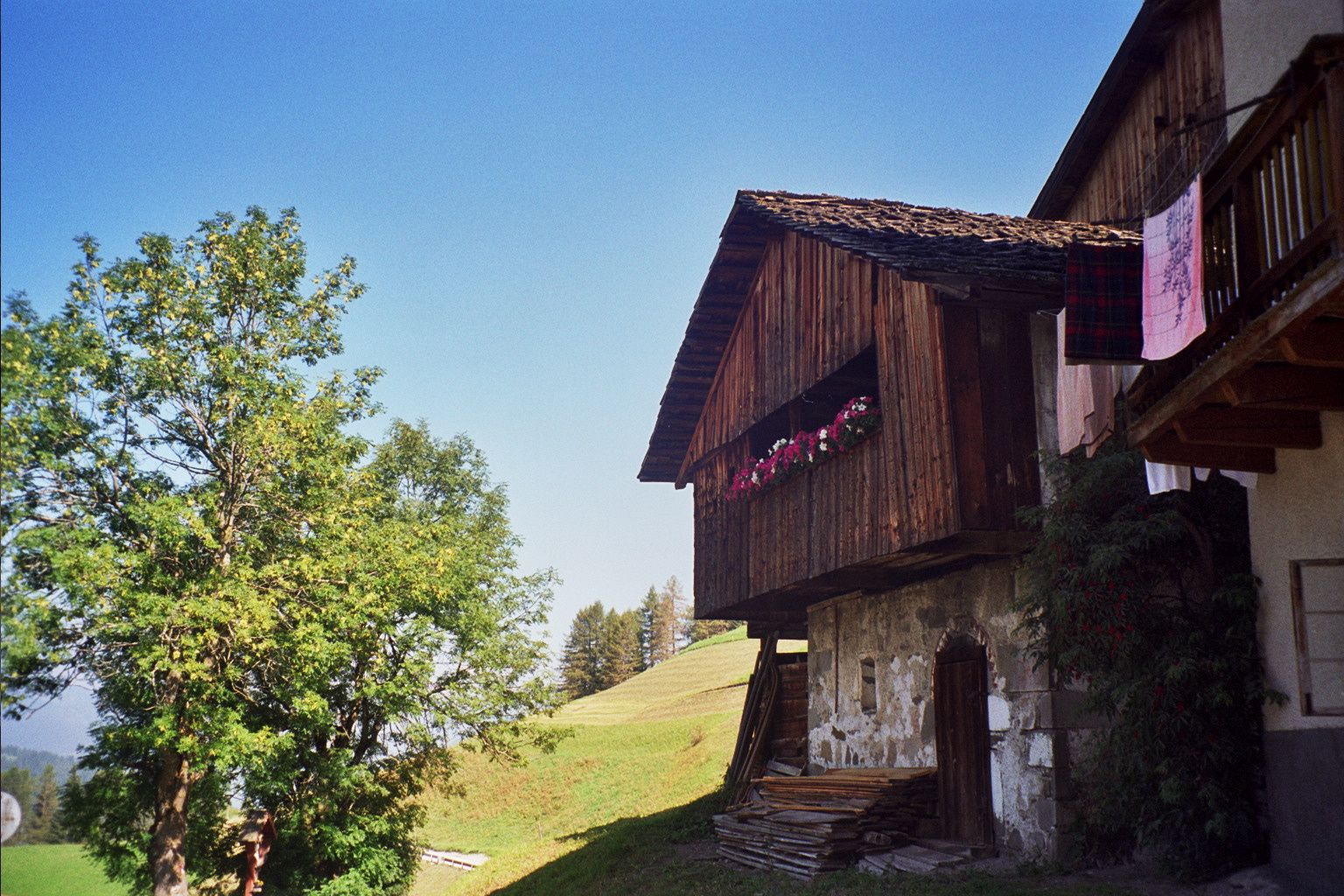
Romanesque house in Furnacia

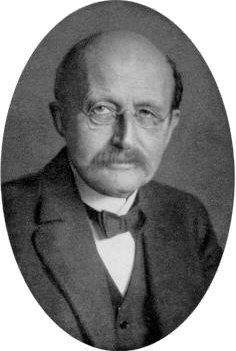
Max Planck was guest in Rumestluns

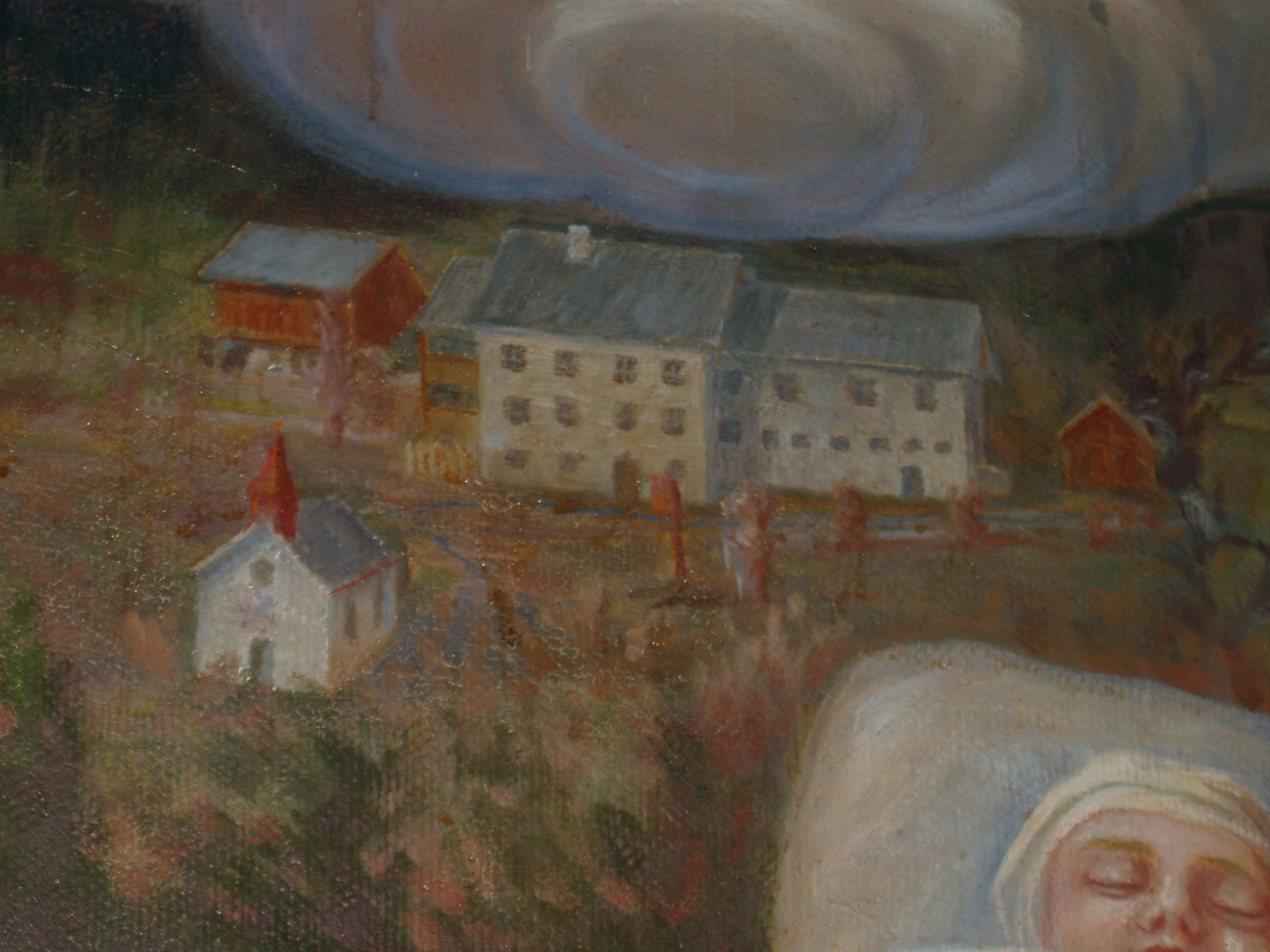
Old Bath Rumestluns "as seen by the chapel itself"

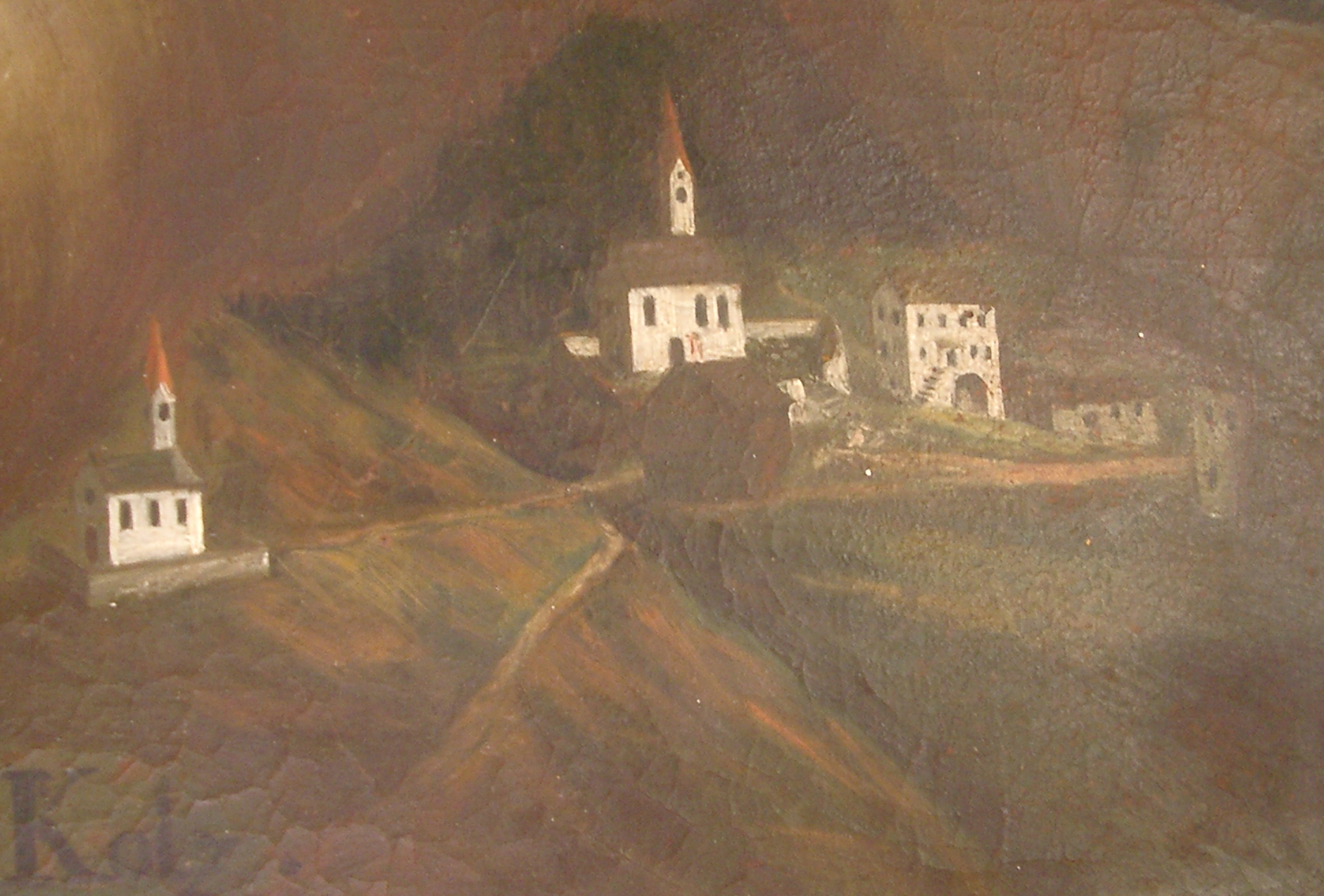
Barbarakapelle (left) and old church (middle) "as seen by the chapel itself"

== See also ==
- Sas dles Nü
- Sas dles Diesc
- Sas dla Crusc
