= Brunecker Turm =

Mountain in Italy

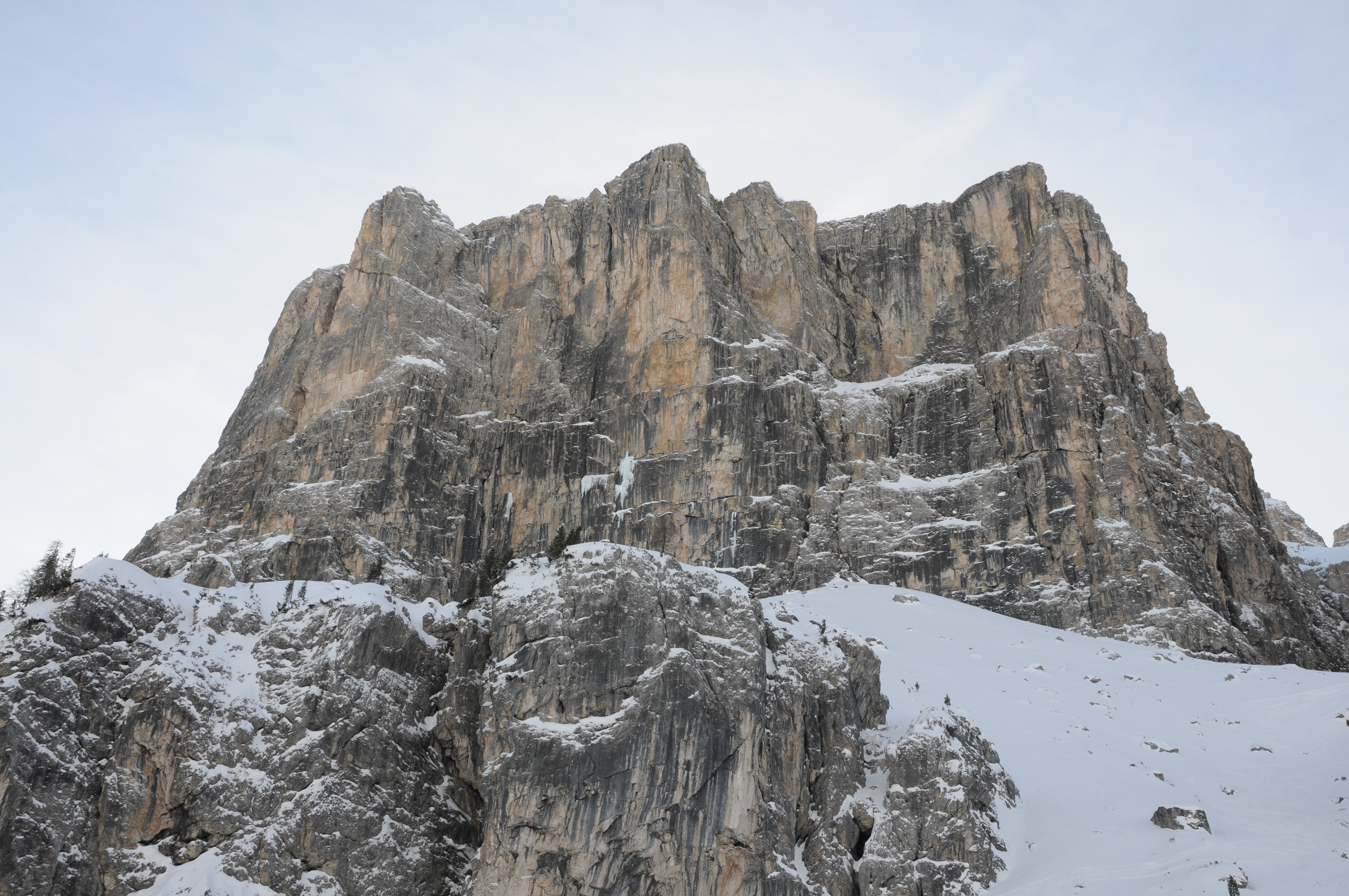

Highest point
- Elevation: 2,495 m (8,186 ft)
- Coordinates: 46°32′31″N 11°49′31″E

Geography
- Location within Alps
- Location: South Tyrol, Italy
- Parent range: Sella group, Dolomites

The Brunecker Turm (Italian: Mur del Pisciadù Occidentale; German: Brunecker Turm) is a mountain belonging to the Sella group in the Dolomites in South Tyrol, Italy.
