= Trento Cathedral =

Trento Cathedral Metropolitan Cathedral Basilica of Saint Vigilius
- Cattedrale di San Vigilio, Duomo di Trento
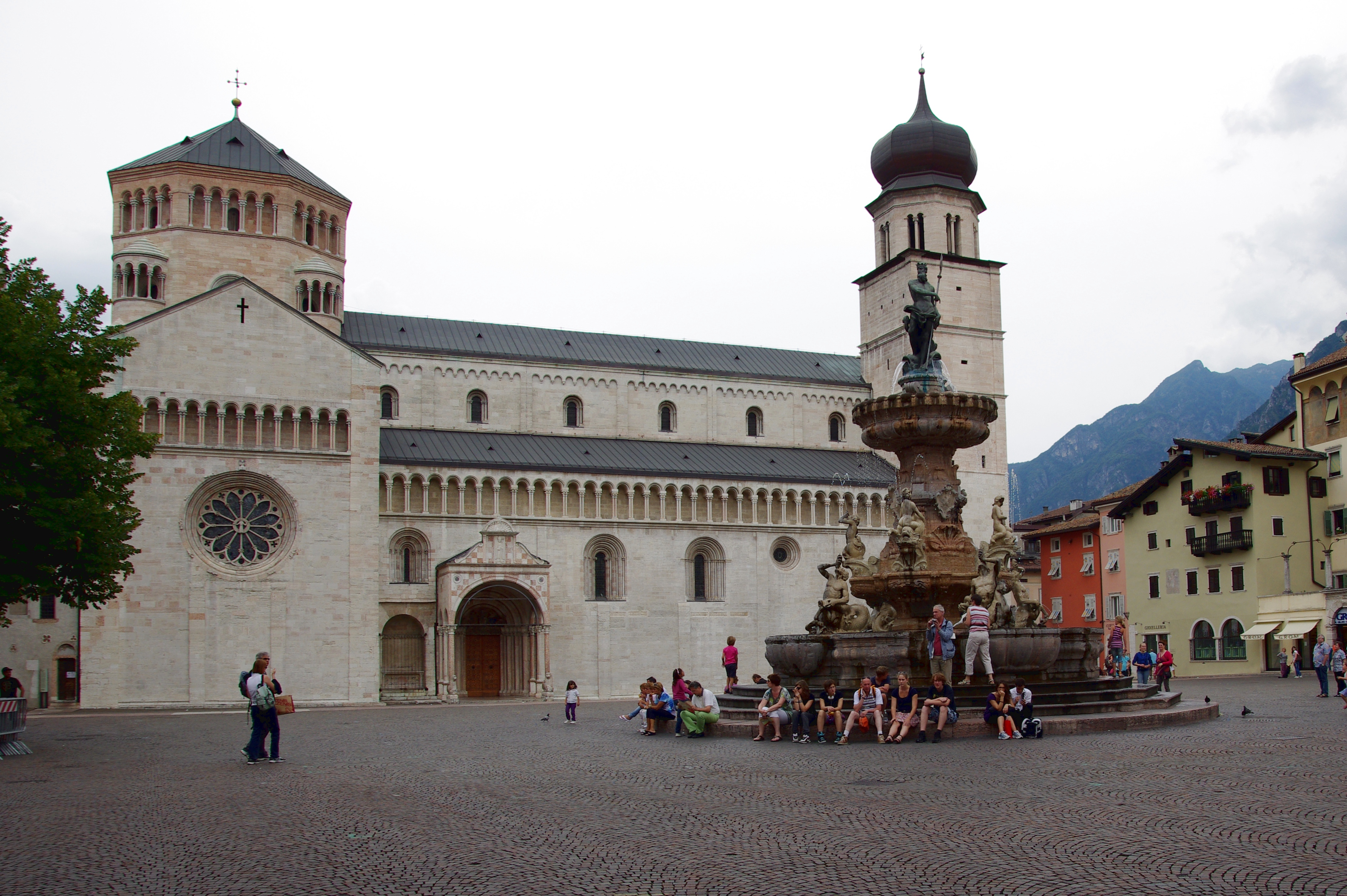
- The Cathedral viewed from the Fountain of Neptune
- Trento Cathedral; Metropolitan Cathedral Basilica of Saint Vigilius
- 46.0670°N 11.1216°E
- Location: Trento
- Country: Italy
- Denomination: Catholic
- Website: Official website

History
- Consecrated: 18 November 1145

Architecture
- Architect: Adamo D'Arogno
- Style: Romanesque-Gothic
- Groundbreaking: 1212
- Completed: 1743

Administration
- Archdiocese: Trent

Trento Cathedral (Italian: Cattedrale di San Vigilio, Duomo di Trento; German: Kathedrale Trient; Trentino dialect: Dòm) is the main church in the city of Trento. It serves as the cathedral of the Archdiocese of Trento and was elevated to the rank of minor basilica by Pope Pius X on 18 March 1913. It was also designated an Italian national monument by royal decree in 1940.

Originally constructed as a cemetery basilica, the cathedral was founded in the 4th century by Saint Vigilius to house the remains of the martyrs of Anaunia. It has undergone several construction phases over the centuries. Notably, a complete reconstruction was initiated by the Prince-Bishop Federico Vanga in the early 13th century and continued into the 16th century, resulting in the current Romanesque-Gothic forms. Subsequent modifications have further shaped the structure. The remains of the ancient Paleochristian Basilica of San Vigilio are preserved and displayed beneath the current floor level.

Located in the city center, the cathedral forms the southern boundary of Piazza Duomo with its left flank, while the Palazzo Pretorio is annexed to the left side of the presbytery. Externally, the cathedral features two notable rose windows (one on the facade and another on the north transept) and a majestic northern prothyrum. Inside, it houses several monumental tombs, Baroque masterpieces such as the high altar and the Chapel of the Crucifix, and numerous 13th- and 14th-century frescoes, many of which are fragmentary, including a prominent cycle depicting the life of Saint Julian the Hospitaller.

== History ==
=== Foundation ===
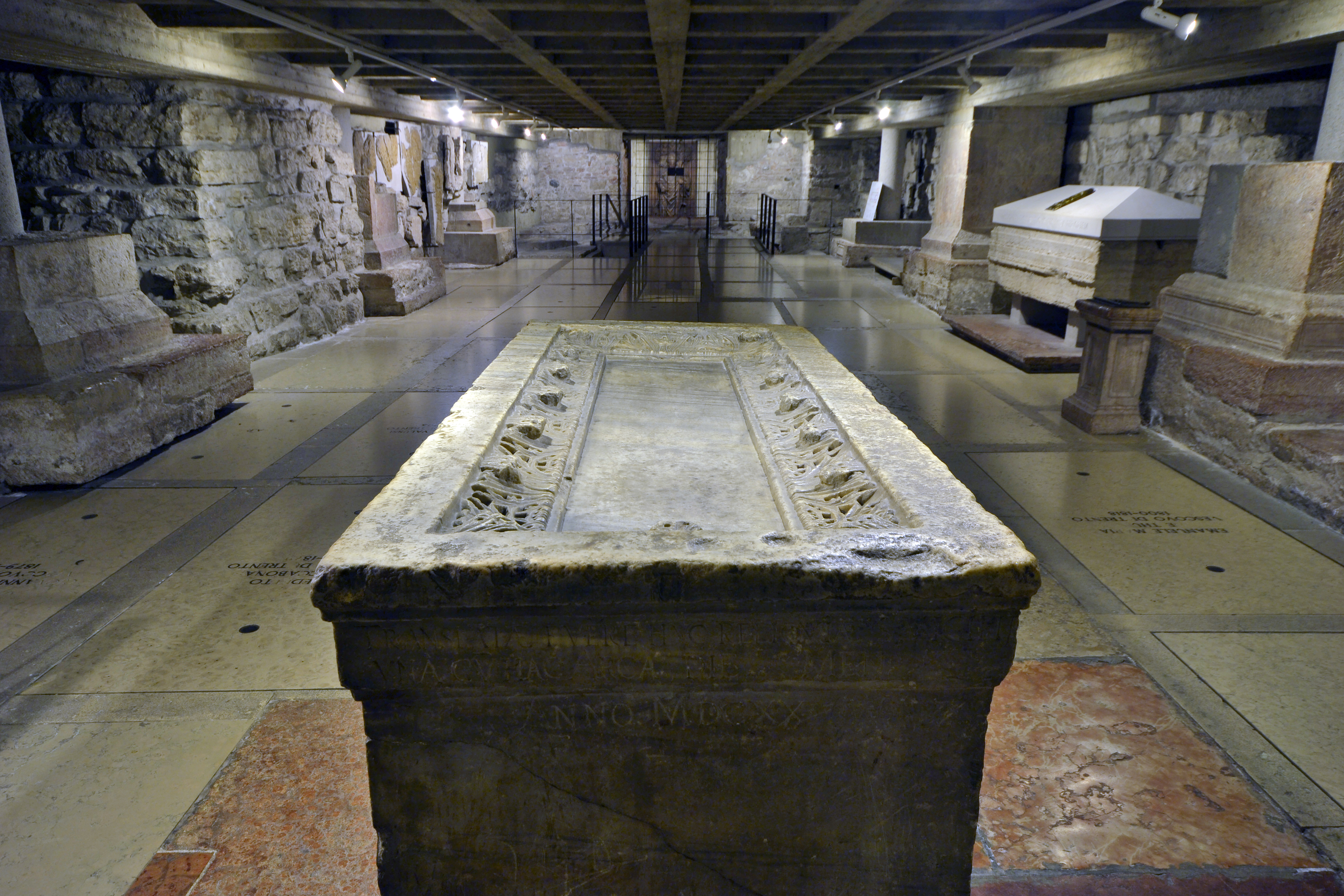
The Paleochristian Basilica of San Vigilio beneath the current cathedral, viewed from the tomb of Saint Vigilius.

Archaeological excavations conducted since the mid-20th century have revealed that the area where the cathedral stands, just outside the walls of ancient Tridentum near the Porta Veronensis (located at the Torre Civica), was urbanized between the 1st and 2nd century with primarily commercial structures. By the late 3rd century, these were largely abandoned, and in the following century, parts were repurposed for the construction of the first basilica on the site.

According to the Passio Sancti Vigilii (composed between the late 7th century and early 8th century), Vigilius, Bishop of Trento, built the basilica to house the remains of the martyrs of Anaunia, killed in 397, and was himself buried there upon his death in 400 or 405. At the time, another church, located at the site of the Church of Santa Maria Maggiore, served as the cathedral, while the present cathedral was established as a cemetery church. It is estimated that between the 5th and 6th century, over 200 floor burials with inscriptions existed, of which approximately 80 have been uncovered. Some sources suggest the church founded by Vigilius was dedicated to Saints Gervasius and Protasius. The dedication to Saint Vigilius likely occurred during the episcopate of Eugippius (6th century).

The original structure consisted of a large nave 14 meters wide and over 43 meters long, terminating in an apse of indeterminate shape. The facade, built on a Roman wall, featured a large central portal, possibly flanked by two smaller ones. In front, there was a pronaos and a walled atrium, initially paved with clay and later with stone slabs. By the 6th century, the presbytery was raised by one step and accessed via two lateral gates located about 32.5 meters from the facade.

From the second half of the 6th century, likely under Bishop Eugippius, burials continued only outside the church, and internal tombs were covered by a new floor, partially decorated with mosaic. Simultaneously, a podium extending about two meters into the nave was added to the presbytery, enclosed by a barrier with carved slabs and pillars and a central access. Flanking the presbytery were two identical sacella, square in plan with semicircular apses, each containing an altar and a colonnaded niche housing a sarcophagus. The southern sacellum’s sarcophagus, from the Lombard period (late 7th to early 8th century), is still intact.

=== From the 8th to the 12th century ===
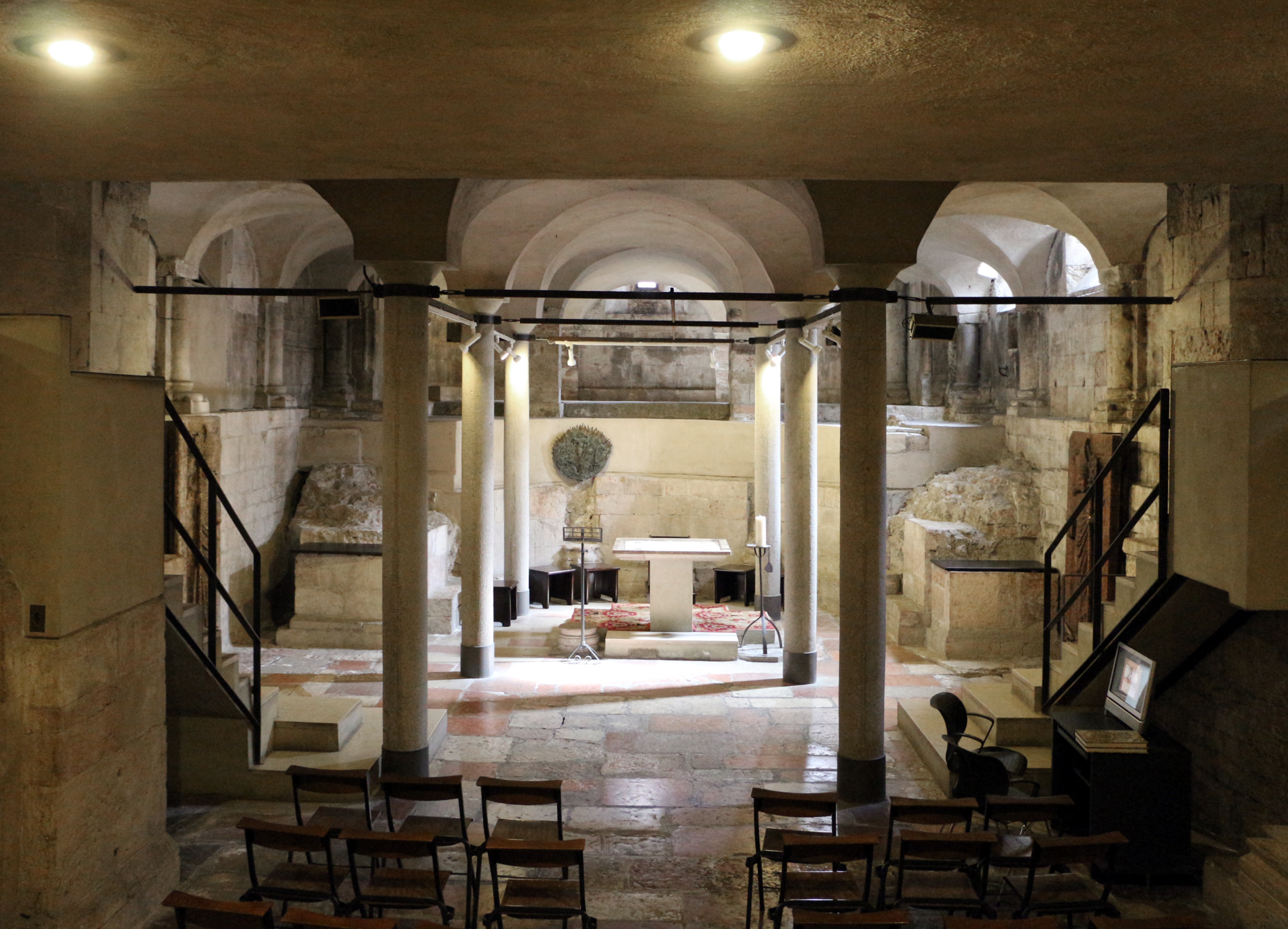
Remains of the crypt, largely demolished in the 18th century, now part of the archaeological area of the Paleochristian basilica. The crypt was located 1.10 meters below the cathedral’s floor, accessible via three large frontal arches and lateral entrances. Above it, 4.30 meters higher than the nave, was the presbytery, where solemn sessions of the Council of Trent were held.

The height difference between the nave and presbytery was leveled between the late 8th and 9th century with a new stone slab floor, and the interior was likely divided into multiple naves. The facade was modified by sealing the lateral portals and erecting an avant-corps with three arches supported by pillars, possibly sustaining a loggia. These changes may have been promoted by Iltigarius, the first Franco-Germanic bishop of Trento, who is credited with erecting a new altar in the church. Between the 9th and 10th century, a new episcopal residence (now the Castelletto del Palazzo Pretorio) was built between the Porta Veronensis and the basilica, which then became the cathedral of the diocese.

Further modifications occurred in the first half of the 11th century under Bishop Udalric II (1022–1055). The nave was divided into three sections by pairs of pillars and pilasters, with square bays in the main nave and rectangular ones in the side naves. The two sacella were incorporated into the nave by demolishing the wall separating them from the presbytery, transforming them into transept arms. A raised presbytery with frontal staircases was constructed, with a crypt beneath accessible by lateral stairs. All areas were repaved, leveling the height difference between the interior and exterior, which had increased over centuries due to sediment from the nearby Fersina stream.

In the 12th century, Bishop Altemanno made further changes. The terminal part of the structure was rebuilt with three apses, which, together with the two former sacella in the transept, totaled five. The crypt was also rebuilt, enlarged, and given a cross-shaped plan with a central hall divided into three small vaulted naves and two apsed lateral wings. On 18 November 1145, the basilica was reconsecrated by the Patriarch of Aquileia Pellegrinus and the Bishop of Concordia Gervico. Altemanno dedicated the crypt to Saint Maxentia, believed to be Saint Vigilius’s mother, transferring her relics from Maiano (now Santa Massenza, a hamlet of Vallelaghi).

=== From the 13th to the 16th century: Vanga’s reconstruction and the Council ===
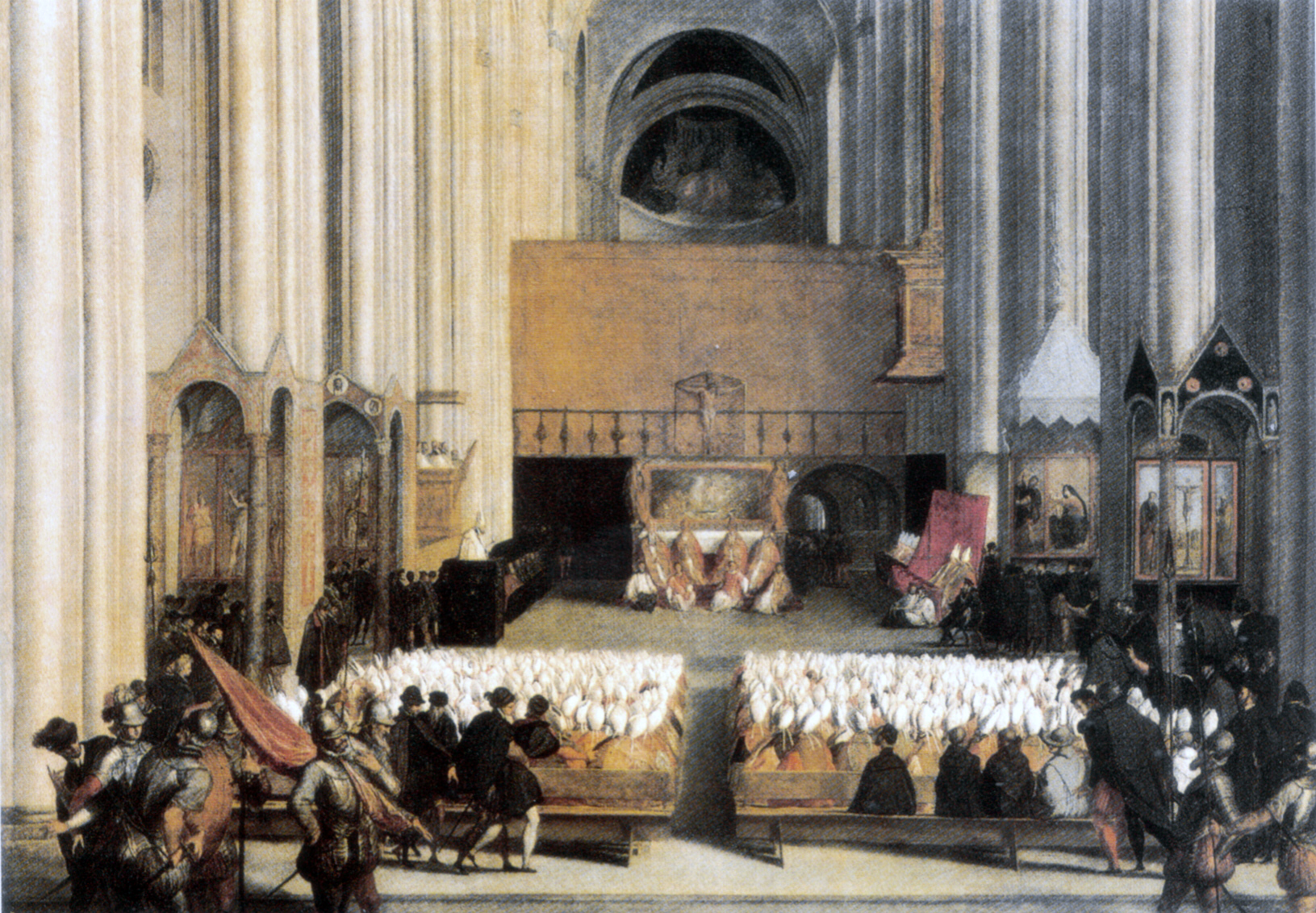
The Council of Trent in the Cathedral, painting attributed to Titian, housed at the Louvre. Note the lateral altars against the pillars, later moved by Carlo Gaudenzio Madruzzo, and the arches accessing the crypt.

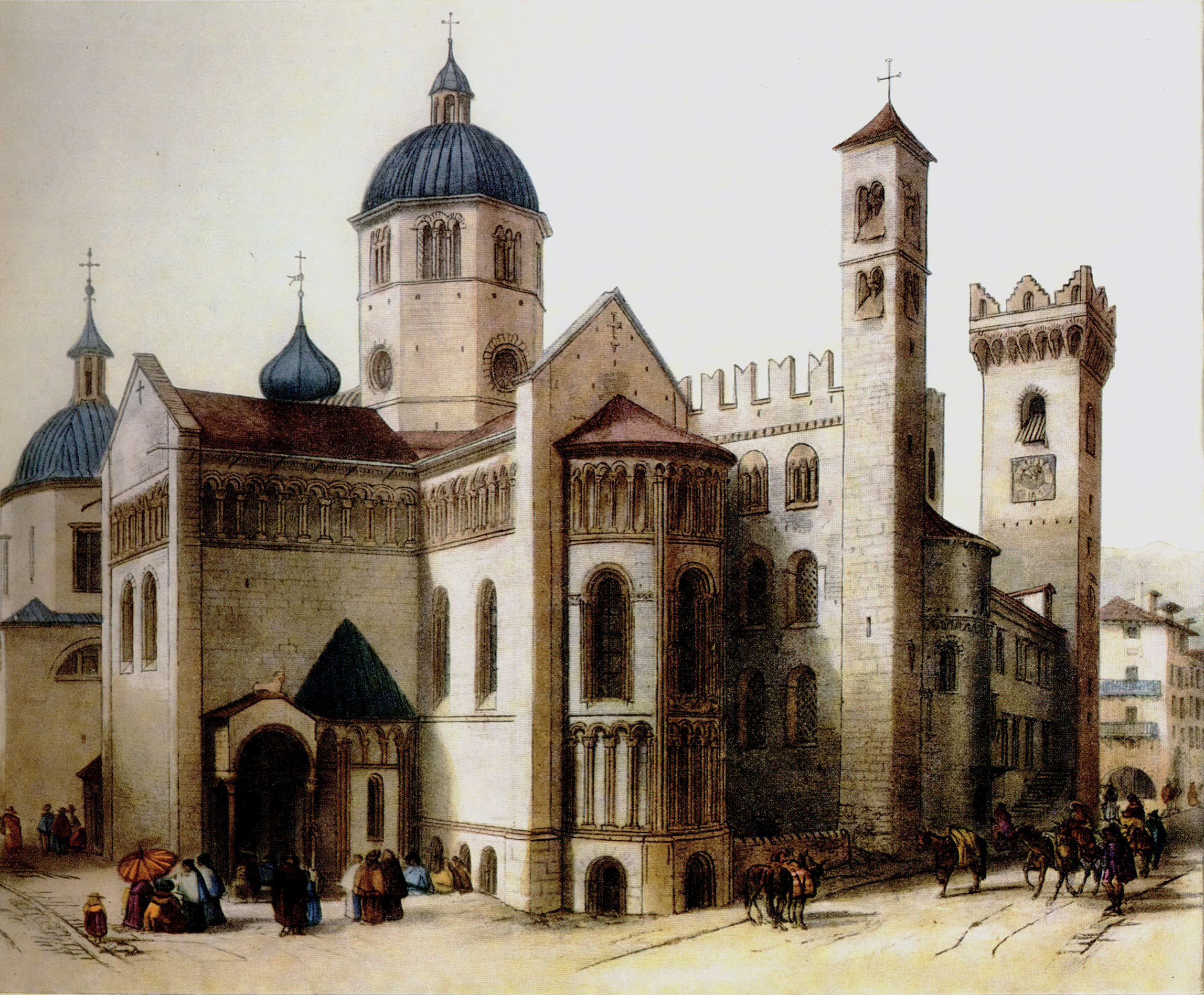
The rear of the cathedral in a lithograph by Day & Haghe, 1820.

Less than a century later, Prince-Bishop Federico Vanga, appointed in 1207, decided to completely rebuild the cathedral, entrusting the project to the Comacine master Adamo d’Arogno from Ticino. The cornerstone was laid on 29 February 1212, though the exact completion date and subsequent consecration are unknown, as construction spanned over a century. Vanga died in the Holy Land in 1218 during the Fifth Crusade, leaving the project to his successors, which slowed progress significantly.

Construction began with the apse area, progressing toward the facade without initially demolishing the older structure. Construction was likely mostly finished by the early 1230s. Around 1236, Adamo d’Arogno died, and his descendants, including his son Enrico and grandsons Zanibono and Adamo, took over. From the second half of the 13th century, fresco decoration of the interior began, continuing into the next century, with contributions from artists primarily from Verona, Bologna, and Lombardy.

The construction saw numerous design changes. Under Egidio da Campione (documented as construction manager from 1305) and Bishop Heinrich III. von Metz (1310–1336), the architectural style shifted from Adamo’s Lombard approach to a Carolingian-inspired Gothic, creating a contrast between the cathedral’s front and apse areas. Egidio completed the south flank, the facade up to the rose window, and the lower part of the bell tower. The patronage of Guglielmo da Castelbarco was notable in the facade work. The cathedral was planned with twin bell towers, but only the northern one was completed; the southern tower remained unfinished due to structural, economic, and stylistic reasons, leaving only the lower part of its shaft.

The upper facade and the vault of the first bay were likely completed under Bishop Georg Hack (1446–1465). The 15th century also saw the raising of two additional levels of the bell tower and the construction of a wall concealing the northern apse to enhance its decorum and align with the Castelletto. A starry sky motif may have decorated the vaults during this period.

In 1490, Domenico di Taio was hired to rebuild the central nave roof, and Bernardo Frisoni da Laino was tasked with constructing the lantern, completed in 1515 under Bishop Bernardo Clesio (hence called the “Clesian dome”). During Clesio’s era, the northern prothyrum was also rebuilt. The 16th century saw the construction of the organ (1506–09), lead roof covering (1515), and further elevation of the bell tower (1521), which barely exceeded the roofline. These works were so problematic that, in 1523, the canons arrested two of the three responsible masters. They released the masters only after taking their children hostage to ensure the works were completed. The bell tower was depicted with a four-pitched roof in a 1562–63 map by Vavassore.

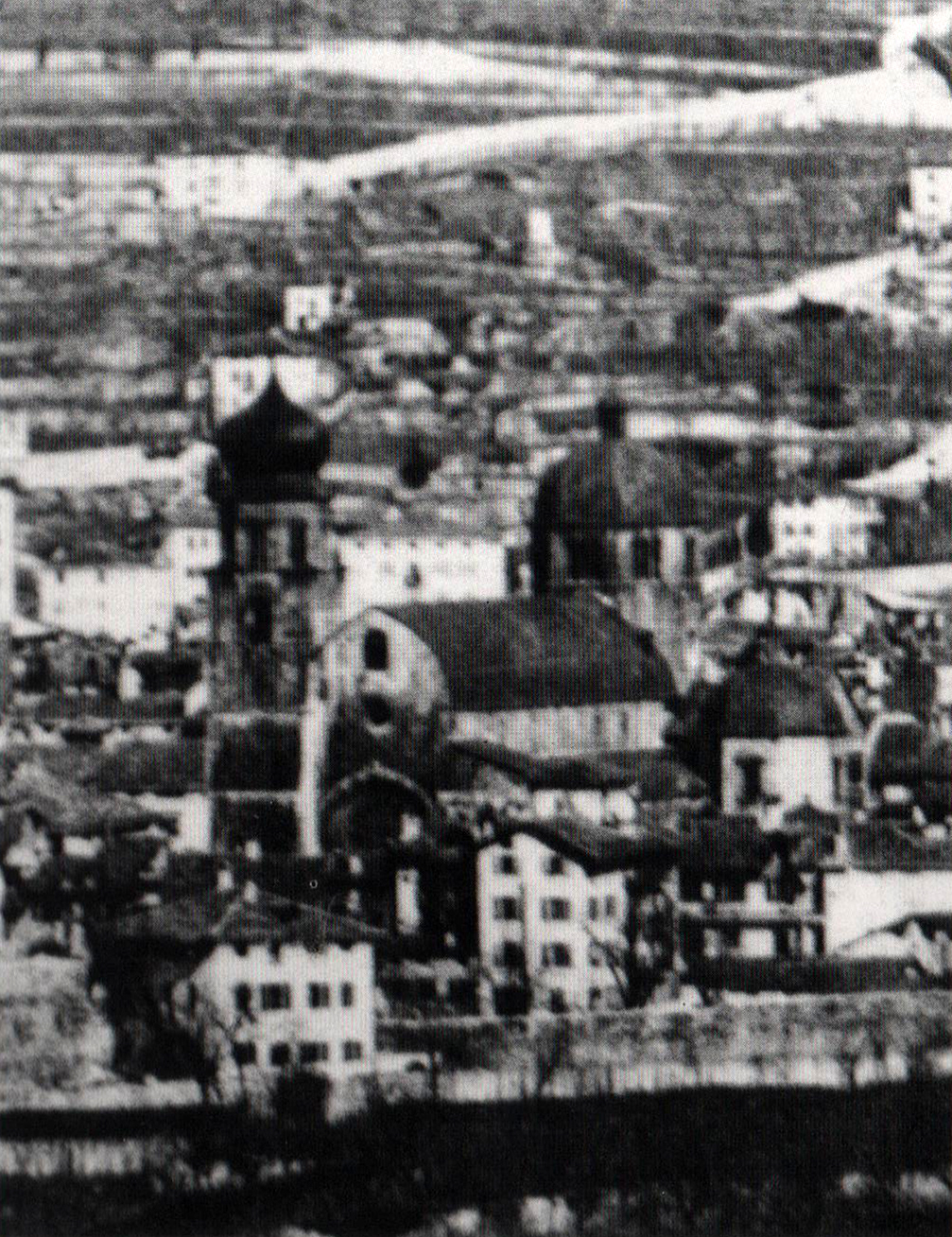
19th-century photograph of the cathedral, showing the hull roof, the “Clesian dome,” and the upper facade without the current gallery.

The 16th century marked two significant events in the cathedral. On 4 February 1508, Maximilian I, en route to Rome for his imperial coronation, was blocked by Venetians and crowned in the cathedral by Cardinal Matthäus Lang von Wellenburg, the first papal-approved imperial coronation not performed by the pope. More significantly, between 1545 and 1563, the cathedral hosted solemn sessions of the Council of Trent, convened by Pope Paul III to address the Protestant Reformation. The first eight sessions, including the opening on 13 December 1545, took place in the choir and sometimes the main nave. After the eighth session on 10 March 1547, the Council was suspended and moved to Bologna due to fears of an epidemic. The eleventh session was held in the cathedral’s choir on 30 April 1551, but the Council was interrupted again on 28 April 1552. Sessions resumed on 18 January 1561, primarily at the Church of Santa Maria Maggiore, except for the final two sessions (24th and 25th) on 11 November and 3 December 1563.

=== From the 17th to the 19th century ===
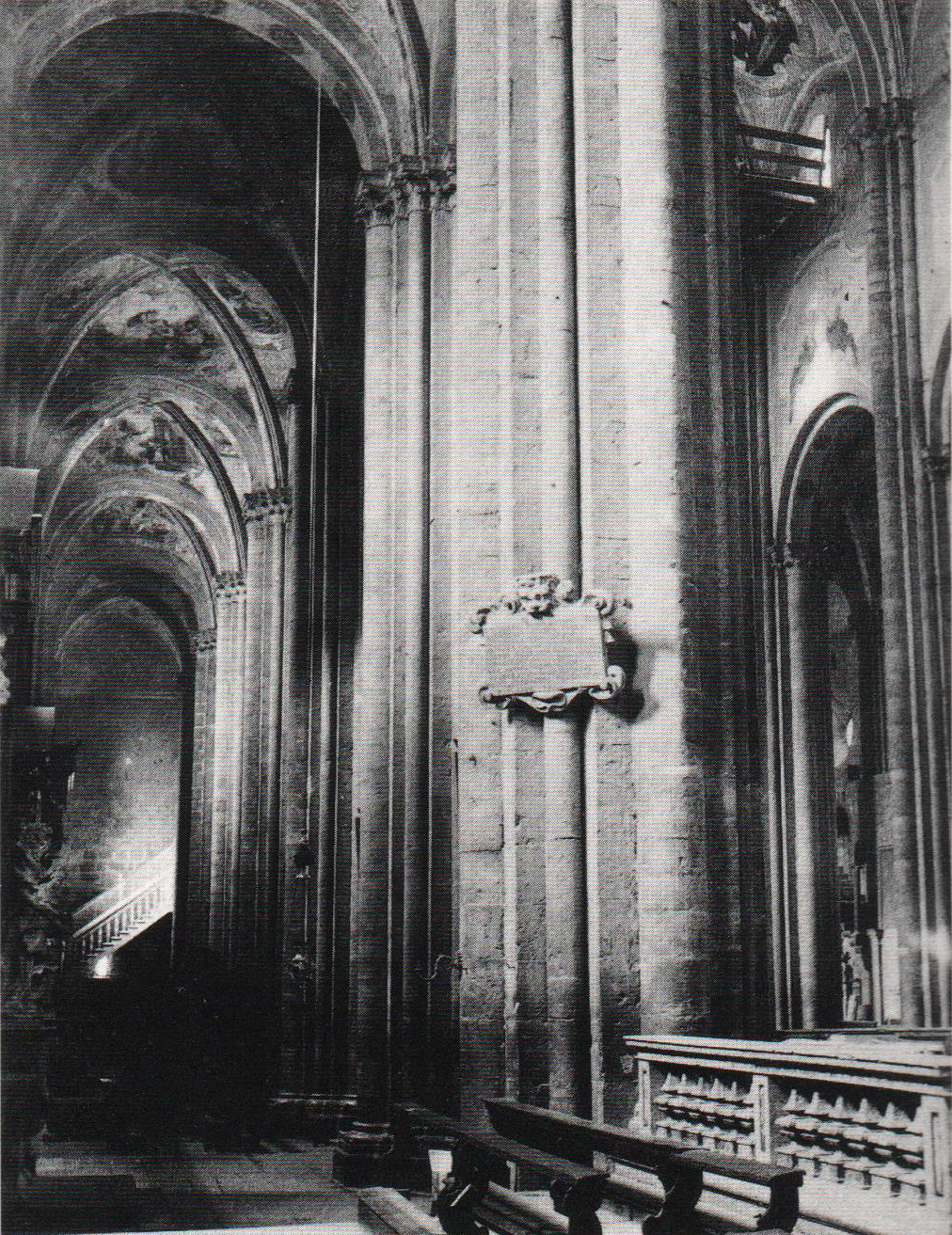
View from the transept toward the southern nave before late 19th-century renovations, showing Baroque frescoes on the vaults and the staircase to the choir loft, both later destroyed.

The 17th century began with the relocation of lateral altars in 1618 and the high altar in 1629, ordered by Carlo Gaudenzio Madruzzo, followed by the demolition (1660–73) of a three-arched rood screen between the canons’ choir and the main nave. The most significant intervention was the construction of the Chapel of the Crucifix, or Alberti Chapel, annexed to the southern flank and completed in 1687. Its cornerstone was laid on 6 April 1682 with the blessing of Bishop Francesco Alberti Poja, intended as his funerary chapel.

In the 18th century, a major decorative campaign was undertaken in fulfillment of a vow made by the population during the 1703 siege of Trento. The nave walls and vaults were frescoed by Louis Dorigny, Giuseppe Antonio Caccioli, and Gaspare Antonio Baroni, with modifications to the dome. The wooden choir of the Holy Angels was built in the main apse, and the grand baldachin high altar required lowering the presbytery by about four meters, demolishing the 13th-century crypt (its remains are now part of the Paleochristian basilica’s archaeological area). By 1717, the bell tower’s pyramidal roof was replaced with an onion-shaped one.

The 19th century saw modifications around the cathedral. In 1828, excavations uncovered the buried perimeter molding. In 1835, the 17th-century Madonna chapel between the northern prothyrum and the transept corner was demolished. Between 1840 and 1842, the pavement of Piazza della Legna (now Piazza d’Arogno) was lowered, and a staircase to Via Borgonuovo (now Via Garibaldi) was added. In 1888, 14th-century Gothic houses facing the cathedral’s facade were demolished, expanding the parvis toward present-day Via Verdi. The dome, restored in 1817, was rebuilt from 1824 to around 1845, along with other roofing. In 1844–1845, Bishop Johann Nepomuk von Tschiderer zu Gleifheim restored the Chapel of the Crucifix.

In 1858, Viennese architect August Essenwein was commissioned for a comprehensive restoration, proposing a radical transformation, including reinstating the crypt, removing the dome, altering the bell tower, and completing the unfinished twin tower. Only the stained glass of the rose window and the wooden panels of the main doors (created by Tommaso Campi in 1863) were completed.

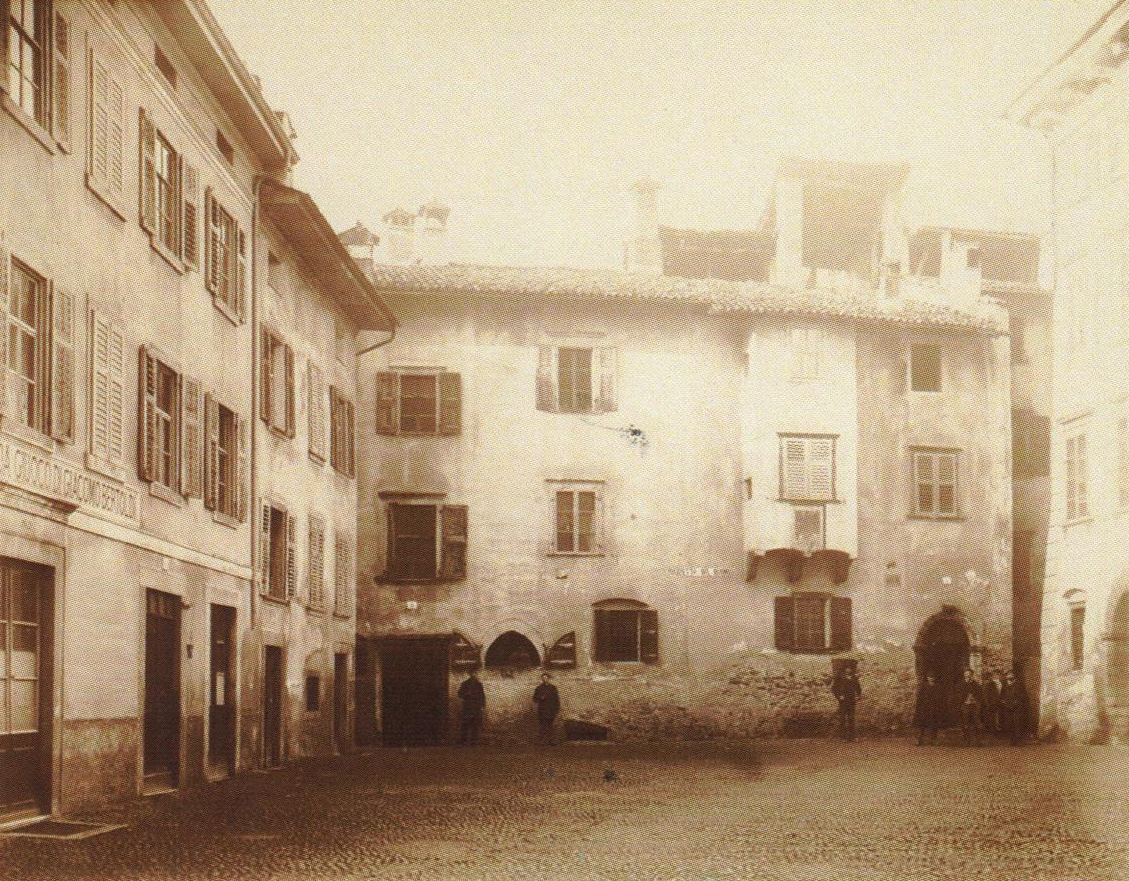
14th-century houses facing the cathedral, demolished in 1888.

The cathedral required urgent repairs, leading to the closure of the main nave in 1878–1879. In 1882, renovations began under Enrico Nordio’s design and direction. Baroque frescoes in the naves were removed, replaced with starry sky decorations by Giuseppe Lona, and the lantern and dome were rebuilt, with the roof changed to a two-pitched design. Nordio left Trento in 1888 under unclear circumstances, and Ludwig Pulsator took over in 1889, (Note: Ludwig Pulsator, German architect, 1856–1899; in Trento, he also designed the Church of the Redeemer, now deconsecrated. See Cecco, Martina (21 July 2015). "Le chiese trentine: in città, come in paese, i ruderi avanzano, il SS. Redentore di Trento". Secolo Trentino. Archived from the original on 24 July 2018.) overseeing the decoration of the semi-dome, choir, crossing, and dome by Luigi Spreafico until completion in 1890. In 1893, Bishop Valussi replaced the floor, removing tombstones, and in 1896, the minor naves’ roofing was redone.

=== Early 20th century ===
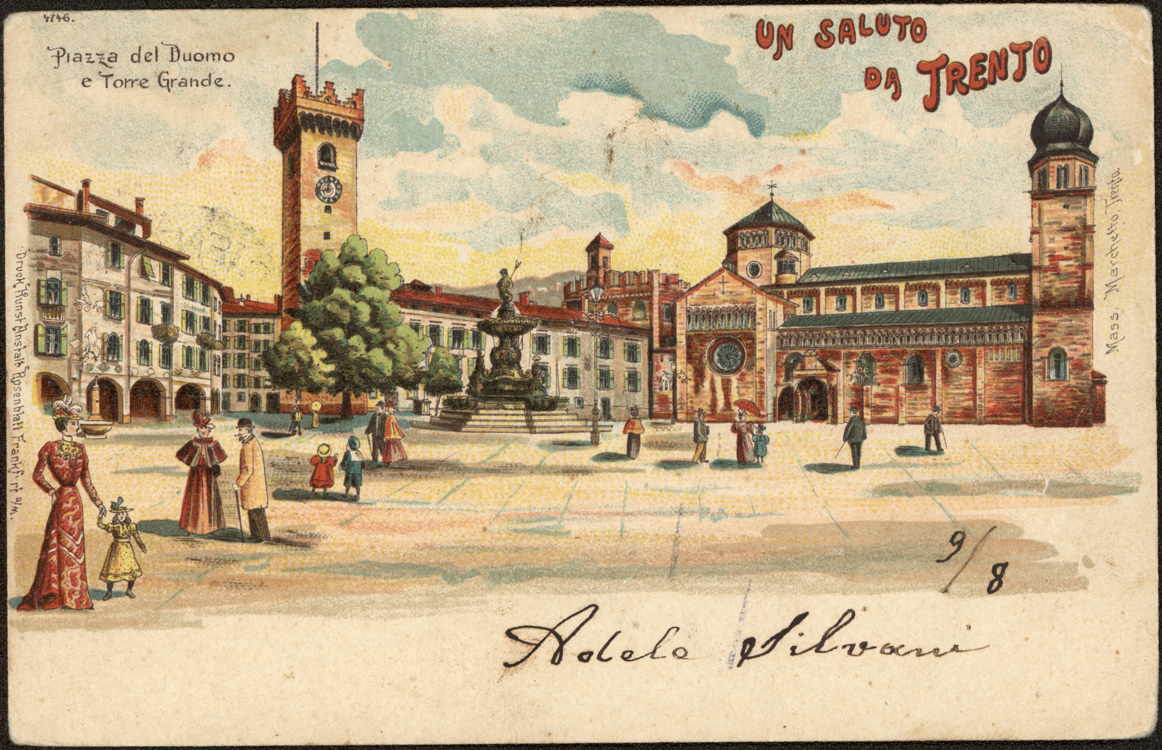
Piazza Duomo, with the Torre Civica and Palazzo Pretorio on the left, the cathedral on the right, and the Neptune Fountain in the center, in a postcard from 1890–1900.

Between 1903 and 1906, Natale Tommasi directed the restoration of the tympana, galleries, facades, and bell tower base. In 1910, the frescoes in the transept were restored, revealing those that had been hidden by bishops' tombstones against the walls.

During World War I, the cathedral’s copper roofs were removed in 1915 for reuse, with the conseil de fabrique compensated with 1,700 kronen in war bonds. They were replaced with poor-quality zinc-plated iron sheets painted to resemble copper, causing water leaks until their later removal. Nearly all bells were requisitioned.

Between 1918 and 1938, under Giuseppe Gerola’s superintendence, various interventions occurred: restoration of the bell chamber (1919), casting of six new bells (1920), partial restoration of the Chapel of the Crucifix’s stuccoes by Camillo Bernardi (1924), roof maintenance (1928 and 1939), installation of a new Mascioni organ, and excavation in the former Saint John chapel under the reliquary sacristy, lowering its level by over a meter and destroying ancient floors (1931).

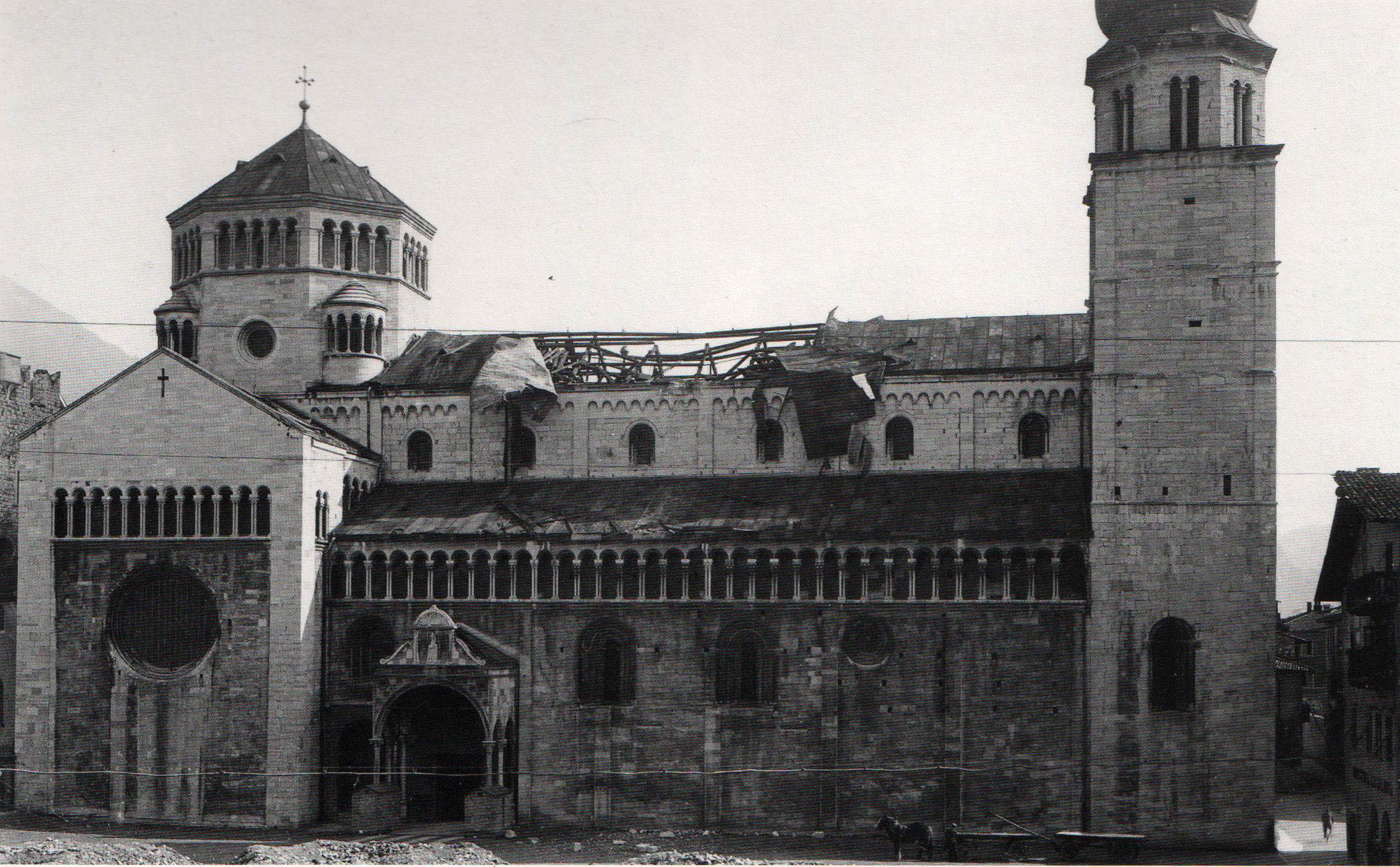
The cathedral damaged by the 13 May 1944 bombing.

As World War II approached, in 1941, Superintendent Rusconi implemented air-raid protections and safeguarded artworks. During a severe bombing of Trento on 13 May 1944, a bomb struck the cathedral, destroying the central nave’s roof, damaging the underlying vault, and affecting the bell tower’s roof and chamber. Urgent repairs were conducted in 1946–48, alongside the replacement of stained glass by Scipione Ballardini.

=== Late 20th century ===
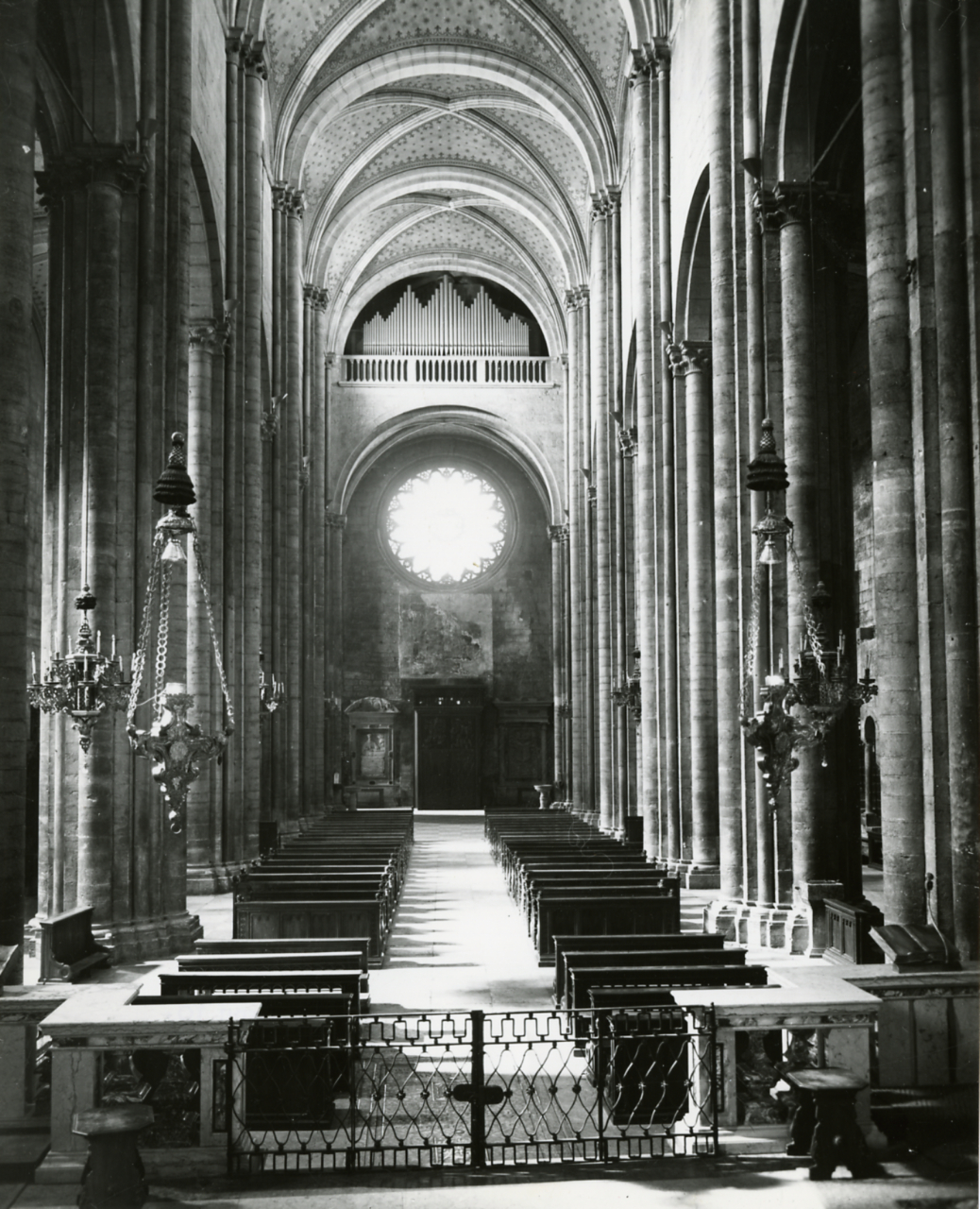
View from the presbytery toward the counterfacade, in a 1965 photo by Paolo Monti; the starry vault decoration is visible above.

In the 1950s, Superintendent Guiotto oversaw various works: restoration of the Chapel of the Crucifix (1950–52), replacement of roofing with copper sheets (1952), replastering of interior and exterior walls (1954), replacement of the bell tower framework and electrification of bells (1954–56), liturgical rearrangement of the presbytery with two new stone and bronze ambons (1955), and restoration of the Saint Julian frescoes (1959).

In 1963, Archbishop Alessandro Maria Gottardi initiated a restoration campaign based on prior commission recommendations. The lateral apses’ windows were reopened, their altars removed, enhancing 13th-century reliefs and uncovering late medieval fresco fragments. The entrance near the Chapel of the Crucifix, sealed since its construction, was reopened, and the presbytery’s furnishings, lighting, and sound systems were reorganized (the latter fully renovated in 1964).

In 1964, sacristies were refurbished, pillars and walls cleaned, vestibules and confessionals replaced, and the Stations of the Cross removed. The 19th-century vault and apse paintings were whitewashed. In 1965, exterior restorations continued, during which the western rose window’s stained glass, designed by Essenwein, was replaced and lost.

Archaeological studies began concurrently. Initial surveys in the choir area led to excavations in the presbytery and transept by 1966, lowering the floor to restore crypt access and rebuilding the presbytery staircase. Excavations resumed in 1973 in the southern transept arm, concluding in 1975 in the central nave. In 1976, the presbytery underwent liturgical retrofit. On 24 June 1977, a funeral Mass was held for the exhumed bishops, whose remains were reinterred in the Paleochristian basilica. Additional restorations, including frescoes in 1981 and exterior sculptures between 1986 and 1998, occurred in the last two decades of the century.

=== Since 2000 ===
In preparation for the Great Jubilee, the archdiocese launched a comprehensive restoration, entrusted to Maria Antonietta Crippa in 1998, preceded by thorough geological and structural analyses. The first phase, completed in 2008, covered the roofing, all facades except the eastern one, and the Chapel of the Crucifix’s interior. Minor internal interventions occurred between 2011 and 2015. From 2017 to 2022, a complete restoration and cleaning of the interior, stained glass, organ, and wooden choir furnishings uncovered previously hidden frescoes. In October 2016, new bronze Stations of the Cross by Gardenese artist Paul Moroder were installed.

== Description ==
=== Urban context and style ===
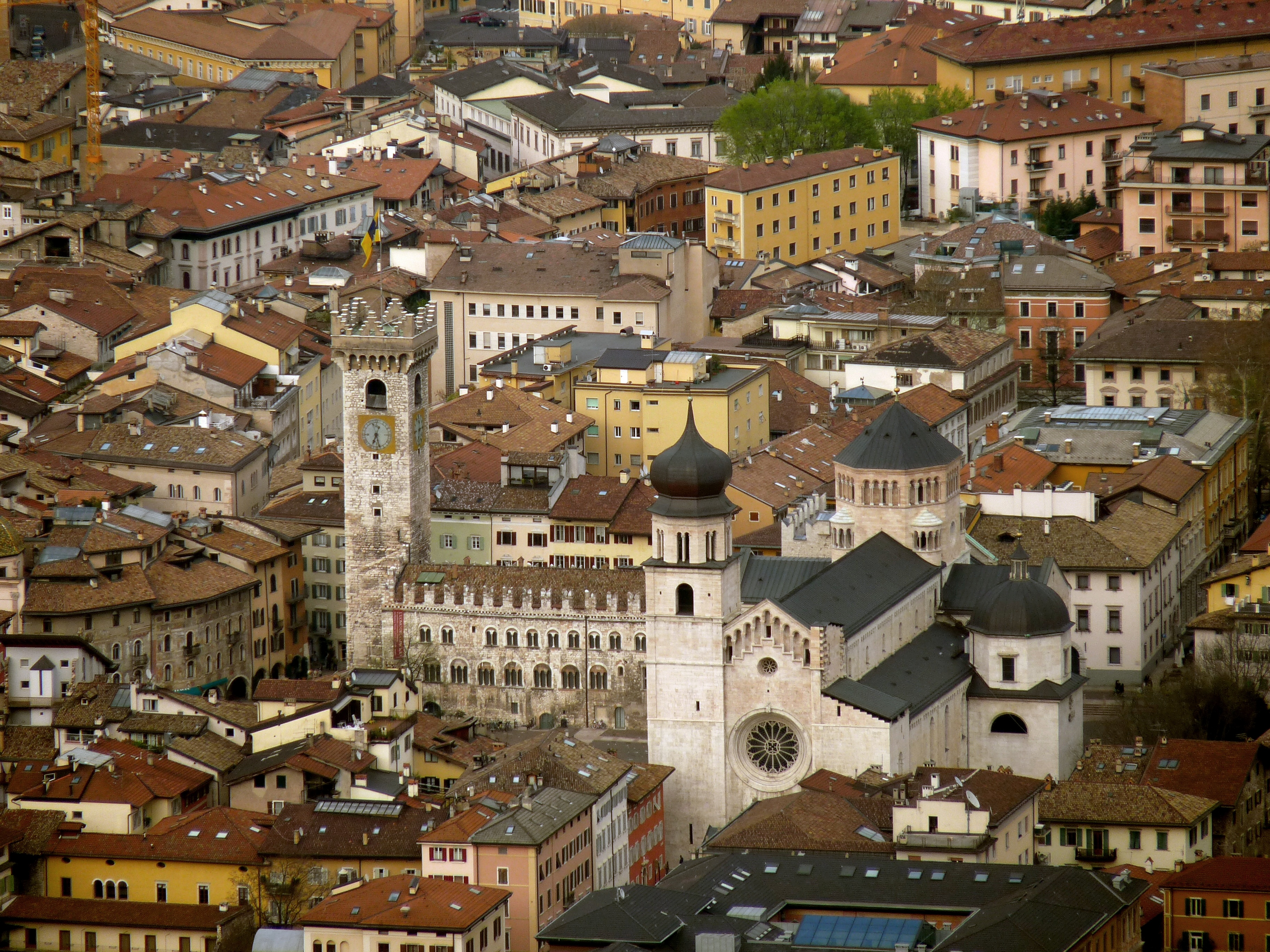
The cathedral and Palazzo Pretorio seen from Sardagna.

The cathedral, oriented eastward with a slightly asymmetrical Latin cross plan, is constructed from local ammonitic stone, with roofs of wooden frameworks covered in copper sheeting. It is located in the southern part of Trento’s historic center, just outside the Roman Tridentum walls. The facade faces Via Giuseppe Verdi toward the Adige River, framed tightly by rows of houses and dominated by a large rose window and the towering bell tower on the left. On the right side lies Piazza Adamo d’Arogno, with old clergy houses along its southern edge, where a 1933 bronze statue of Saint Vigilius by Stefano Zuech stands in a flowerbed.

The cathedral’s left flank, facing the older and more prestigious part of the city, is its most monumental side, forming the southern boundary of Piazza Duomo. At its eastern end, it connects to the Palazzo Pretorio (former Bishop’s Palace) via the Castelletto, forming a single structure. Via Giuseppe Garibaldi runs behind the cathedral and palace, linking Piazza Duomo and Piazza d’Arogno.

The cathedral’s architectural style is complex and debated, classified as late Romanesque, Gothic, or a transitional hybrid. In Romanesque plans, multi-nave churches typically had a square-based presbytery, replicated in the choir and transept arms, with the main nave comprising three such squares and side naves having rectangular or double-square bays supported by an intermediate pillar. In Vanga’s cathedral, this scheme is followed in the older choir, presbytery, and transept, while the naves, built nearly a century later, are distinctly Gothic, with rectangular bays in the main nave and square ones in the side naves. The arches, though not pointed, reflect the Gothic’s slender elevation, as do sculptural elements such as crochet capitals and vegetal decorations. The cathedral also incorporates non-Italian influences: the tripartite exterior wall of the main apse derives from Rhenish architecture, while gemmed capitals draw from French Gothic.

=== Exterior ===
==== Facade ====
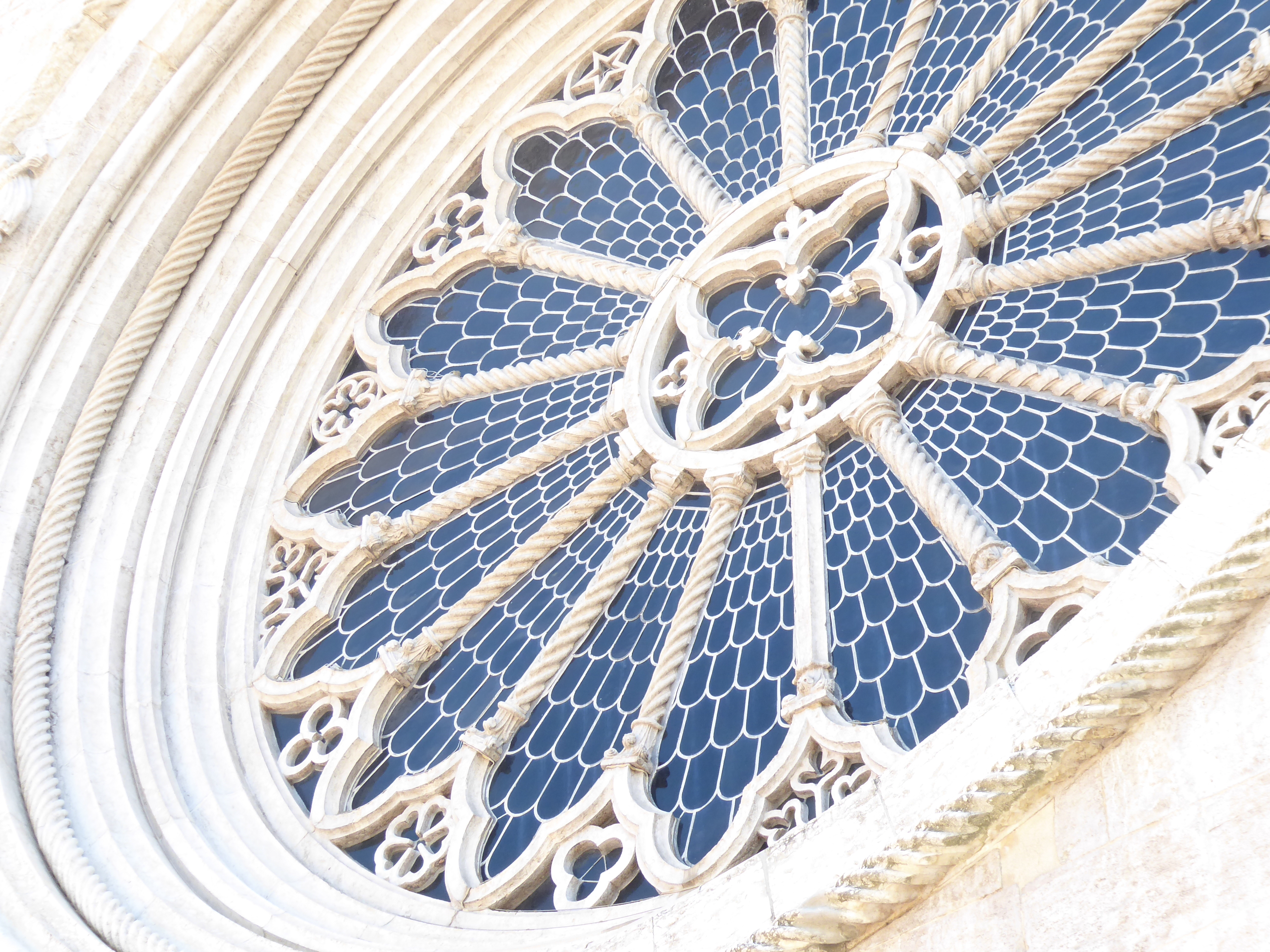
Close-up view of the facade’s rose window.

Simplified plan of the cathedral: A: main portal B: northern prothyrum C: southern prothyrum D: southern secondary entrance E: bell tower F: Chapel of the Crucifix G: presbytery H: choir and main apse I: apse of Saint John J: apse of Saint Stephen K: canons’ sacristy L: reliquary sacristy M: altar of Saint Anthony N: altar of the Assumption O: altar of the Sorrowful Virgin P: altar of Saint Anne Q: access to the archaeological area R: rose window with the Wheel of Fortune S: niche of the Madonna of the Drowned

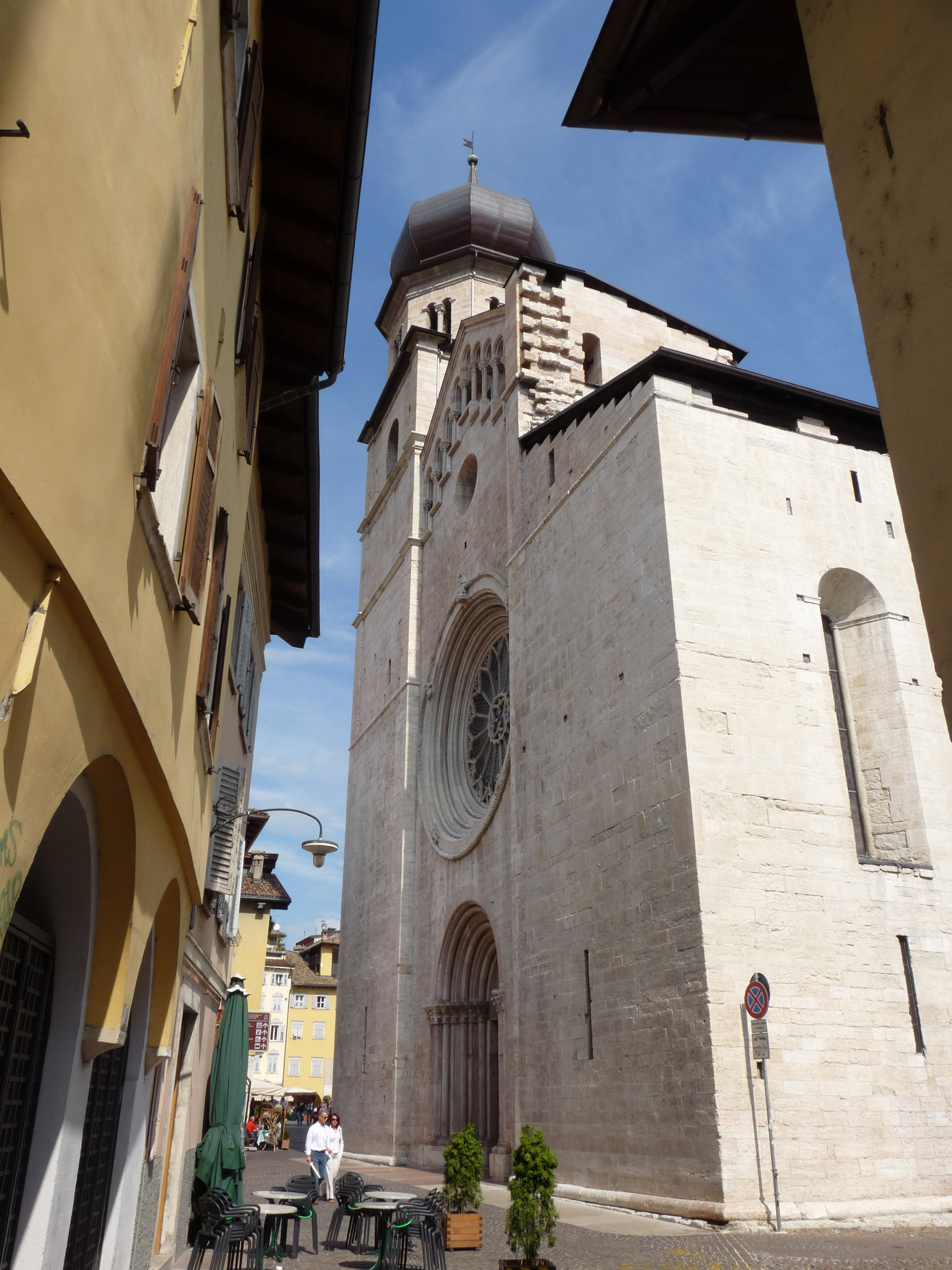
The facade from the southern angle, with the unfinished second bell tower’s shaft in the foreground.

The cathedral features a tall, narrow gable facade, designed for close viewing, as the parvis was limited by houses until their demolition in the mid-19th century. The main portal is deeply splayed and adorned with vine-scroll bas-reliefs (Note: Vine-scrolls are decorative motifs of vegetal elements (e.g., acanthus leaves or vine tendrils) arranged in volutes or spirals.) on the architrave. Above is a blind lunette with a mid-14th-century fresco depicting the Madonna Enthroned with the Child, two saints (possibly Saint Vigilius and Saint Anthony the Abbot), and a kneeling patron, likely a high-ranking layperson given the image’s prominent position.

The tympanum, rebuilt in the late 19th century, is decorated with a small perforated oculus in a rosette pattern and crowned by a passable arcade following the gable’s slopes, with nine round arches on paired columns. The central, deeply splayed rose window in white stone, crafted by Egidio da Campione in the early 14th century, features sixteen rays with varied tracery at the center and ends, and five sculptures along the outer ring depicting the Christ Pantocrator and the four tetramorph symbols of the Evangelists.

==== Bell tower ====
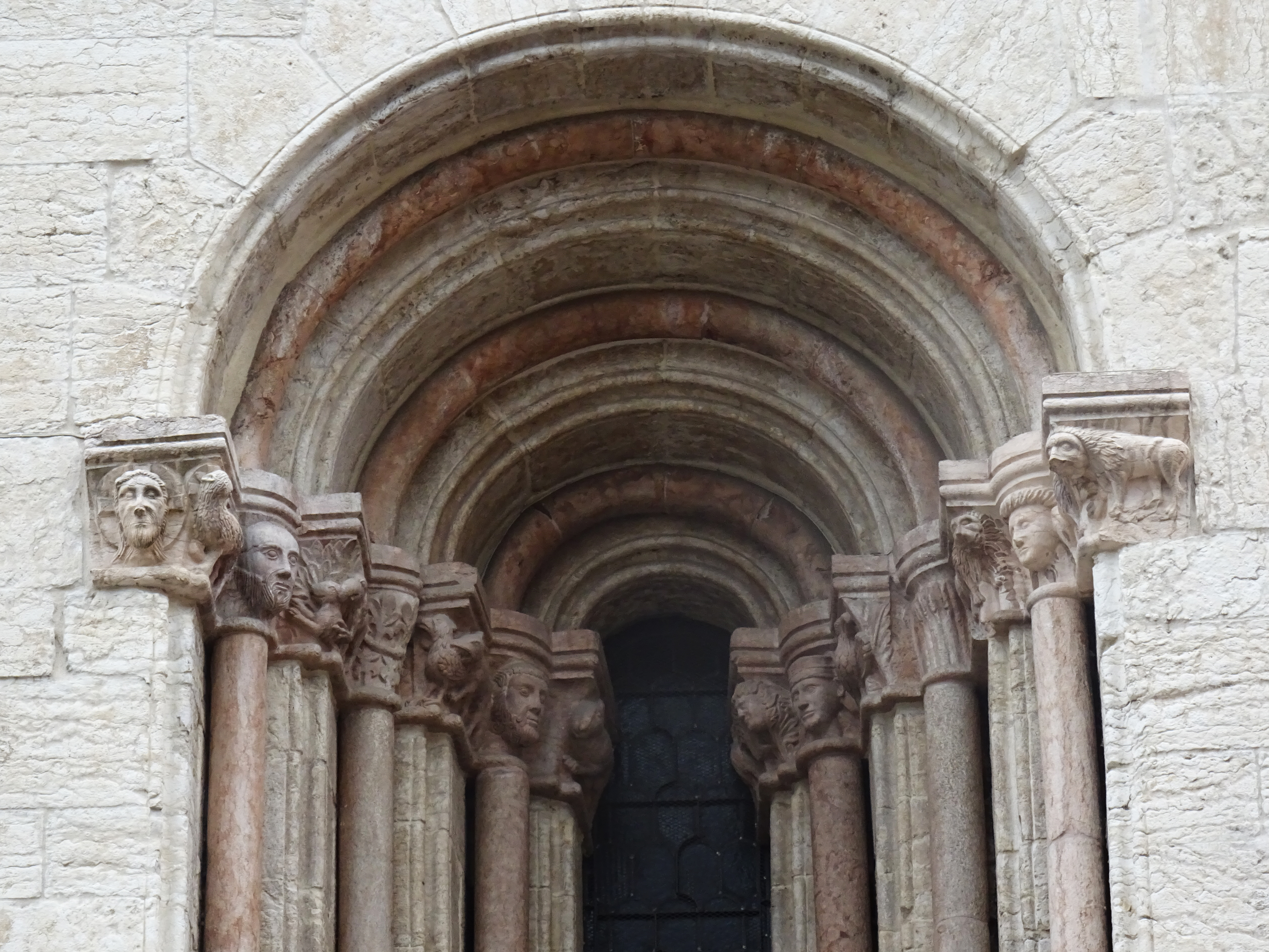
The monofora with sculpted capitals at the bell tower’s base.

Vanga’s cathedral was designed with twin bell towers, but the southern one was never completed, leaving only the base of its shaft, which, along with the northern tower, visually compresses the facade. A 1309 epigraph on the upper part praises Guglielmo da Castelbarco’s generosity. Economic factors aside, the southern tower’s incompletion was due to structural changes in the interior and evolving stylistic preferences; by the Renaissance, a medieval tower near the cemetery was no longer desirable.

The northern bell tower, the only one completed (excluding the San Romedio tower of Palazzo Pretorio), rises from the first bay of the minor nave, supported by two arches without a distinct base. It is marked by four horizontal cornices indicating subsequent elevations. The octagonal bell chamber is lit by narrow biforas with central columns, echoing the triforas of the demolished “Clesian dome.” The roof is onion-shaped, topped with a globe, weather vane, and cross.

Two splayed monoforas adorn the shaft: one high on the west side and another low on the north, the latter featuring animal and human sculptures supporting the arches, crafted by Egidio da Campione in the early 14th century. These include Christ’s face, the Lamb of God, a rabbit and a hen preyed upon by a griffin and a fox, lions (two sharing a head at a capital’s corner), and eagles, all with allegorical significance.

The cathedral's bells have a notable history. The largest, “Il Vigilio,” was commissioned in 1426 by Bishop Alexander of Masovia to founders from Brixen, recast multiple times in the 17th century and again in 1752 by Pietro Maffei. In the 19th century, additional bells by Trento’s Chiappani foundry were requisitioned during the war. "Il Vigilio" was spared, but it was withdrawn after the war due to tuning difficulties. It was placed at the entrance of the minor seminary.

In 1920, Luigi Colbacchini of Trento cast a new set of six bells, funded partly by Mantua’s Beneficentia committee. Decorated by Angelo Campi and Stefano Zuech, they were named “Vigilio” (the largest), “Anselmina” (in homage to Mantua and its patron saint, Saint Anselm), “Santissimo” (after a 19th-century bell funded by the Holy Sacrament confraternity), “Addolorata,” “Celestina” (in homage to Bishop Celestino Endrici), and “Ave Maria.” In the 1950s, two more bells were added, using metal from the 18th-century “Vigilio,” cast by Luigi Cavadini and dedicated in 1955 to Saint Charles Borromeo and the Sacred Hearts of Mary and Jesus. This results in a concert of eight bells in the major diatonic scale of A♭2: the six older bells (A♭2, B♭2, C3, E♭3, F3, A♭3) and two newer ones (D♭3, G3).

==== Left flank ====
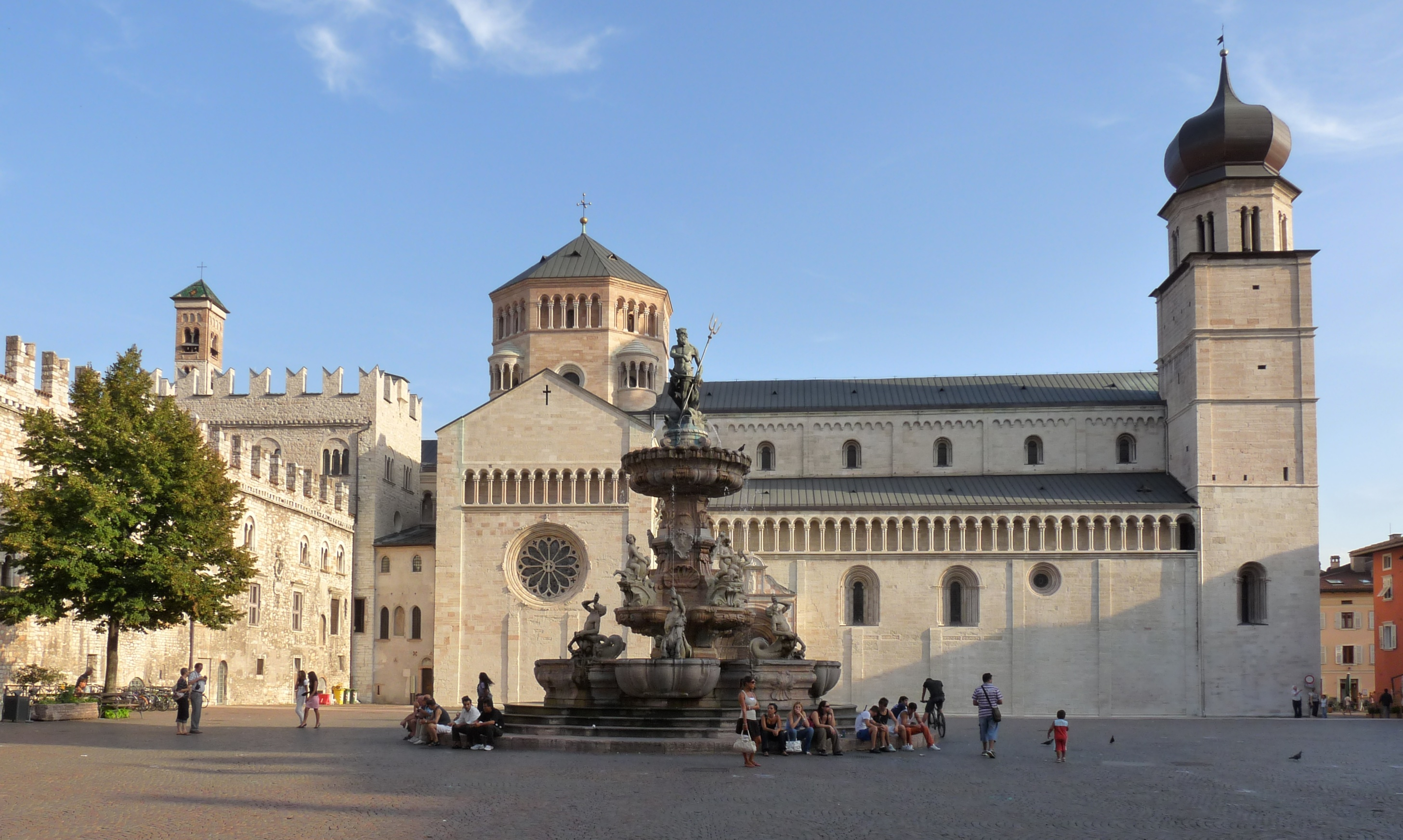
The cathedral’s left flank seen from Piazza Duomo, with the Neptune Fountain in the foreground.

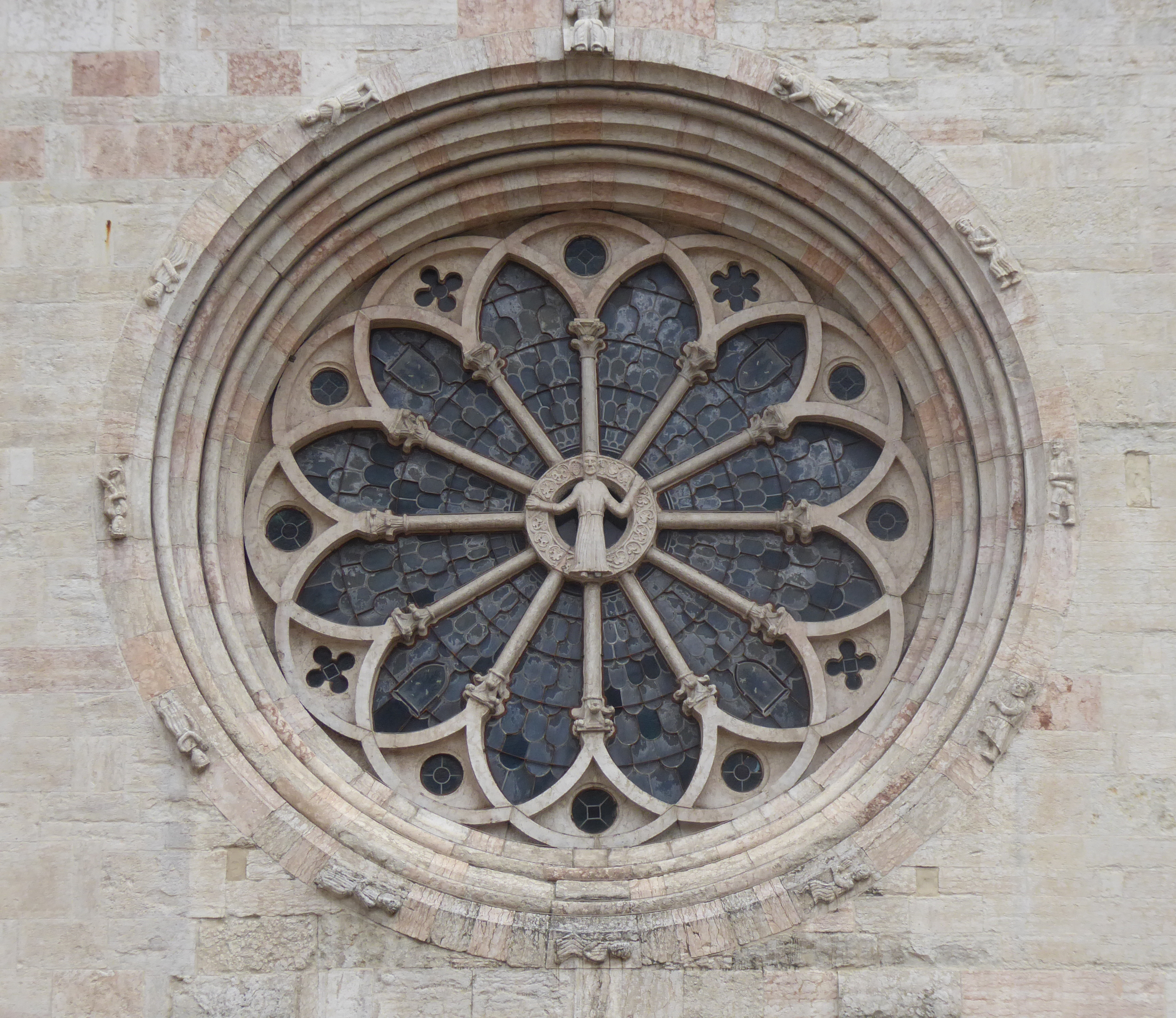
The rose window with the Wheel of Fortune.

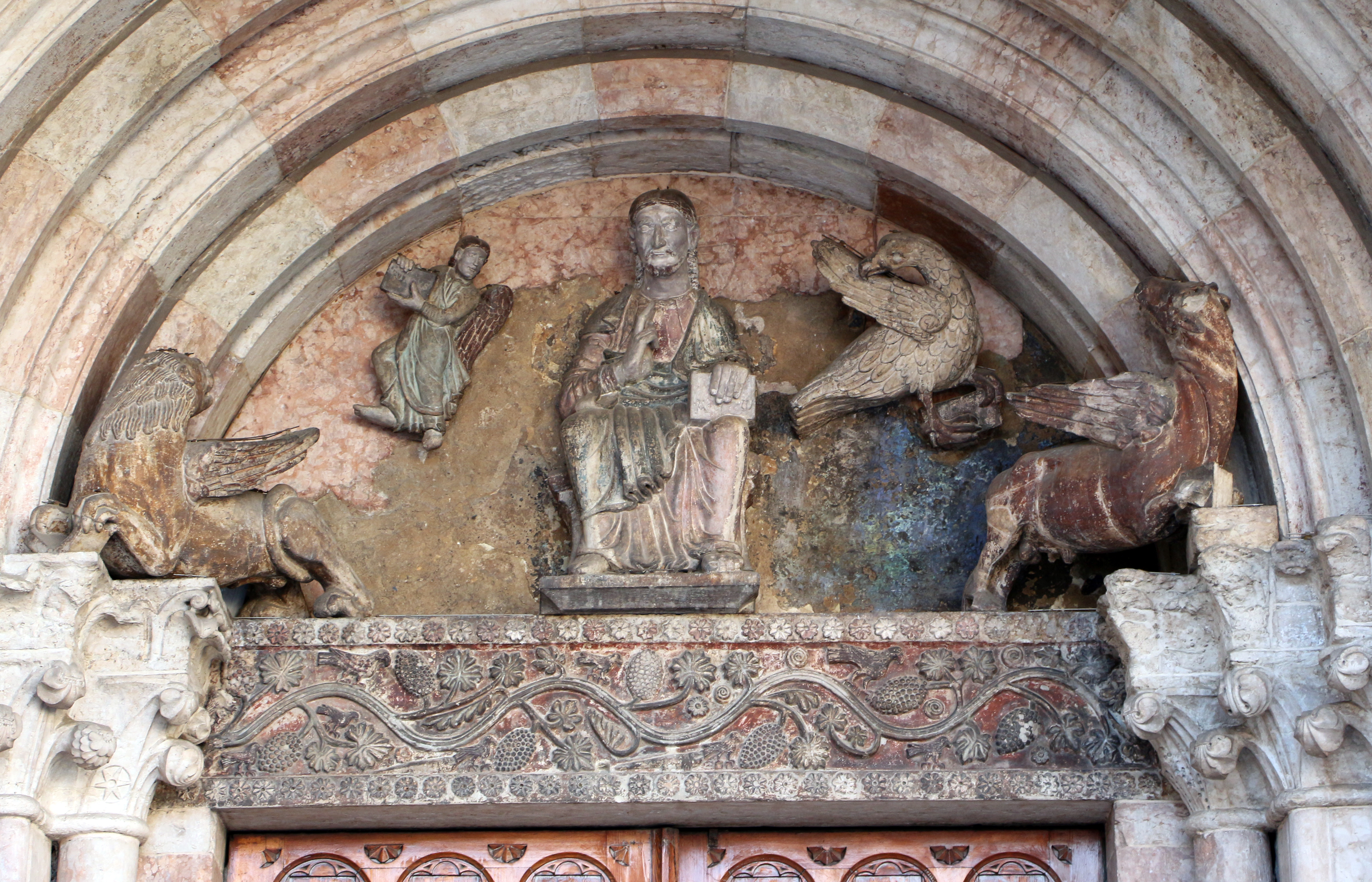
The Maiestas Domini sculptures in the lunette above the “bishop’s door.”

The cathedral’s left flank, prominently visible in Piazza Duomo, shows only a portion of the choir’s gallery, as the rest, from the minor apse onward, is concealed by the Palazzo Pretorio’s Castelletto and a 15th-century wall built to complement the facade. This wall features two rows of pointed arch monoforas and a small architraved portal accessing the passage to the sacristy, topped by a blind lunette with a fragmentary early 15th-century fresco, possibly a Vesperbild, showing the Sorrowful Virgin’s face and parts of flanking angels. The wall also houses a 1460–70 fresco in a niche between the lower monoforas, depicting Saint Vigilius blessing a kneeling figure, possibly a bishop, likely commemorating Johannes Hinderbach’s 1466 investiture.

Beyond the wall, the north transept arm emerges with a two-pitched roof, framed by corner pilasters and two central low pilasters, forming a pseudo-facade dominated by the large rose window with the Wheel of Fortune, a topos of medieval art, possibly inspired by the Basilica of San Zeno in Verona. At its center, Fortune turns an inner ring adorned with vine-scrolls of leaves and grapes. Twelve rays, symbolizing the hours or months, extend from the wheel, with twelve human figures on the outer rim moving counterclockwise, rising or falling with Fortune’s whims: the top figure is enthroned, crowned, and holding two cups. The figures, of modest quality, were likely crafted by an assistant of the anonymous master who sculpted the telamons and lion of the southeast prothyrum. Above the rose window, a walkable gallery with Romanesque paired columns forming round arches extends from the choir to the bell tower. At the base of the wall, several units of length used in trade are engraved, such as the pertica, the pace, and the braccio.

To the right of the transept is a pointed niche topped by a monofora, containing the arcosolium altar of the Madonna of the Drowned (the statue is a copy; the original has been inside since 1979). This is followed by the elegant northern entrance, the “bishop’s door,” used by episcopal processions from the Buonconsiglio via Via Belenzani. It features a prothyrum, reassembled in the 16th century with reused materials, with a round frontal arch and pointed lateral arches supported by three pairs of columns, the front ones resting on column-bearing lions, and Saint Vigilius sculpted in the tympanum. The splayed portal is topped by a lunette with a Maiestas Domini sculptural group—Christ Pantocrator and the Evangelists’ symbols—with traces of polychrome paint. Crafted by Adamo d’Arogno’s workshop, the figures are arranged in an unusually concentric pattern, possibly due to reassembly in the 16th century or relocation from another site, such as the internal rood screen.

The remaining minor nave wall is punctuated by six pilasters, not all aligning with internal bays, likely remnants of an abandoned design due to window insertions. Besides the monofora above the Madonna niche, there are two other splayed round monoforas interrupting pilasters and a splayed oculus. Three Roman-era sculpted stones with friezes, including a trident, were reused in this wall. The walkable gallery continues above the windows, stopping at the bell tower on the right. The central nave’s wall, emerging from the gable, is more regular, divided into six sections with Lombard bands and each featuring a monofora.

== Right side and rear ==
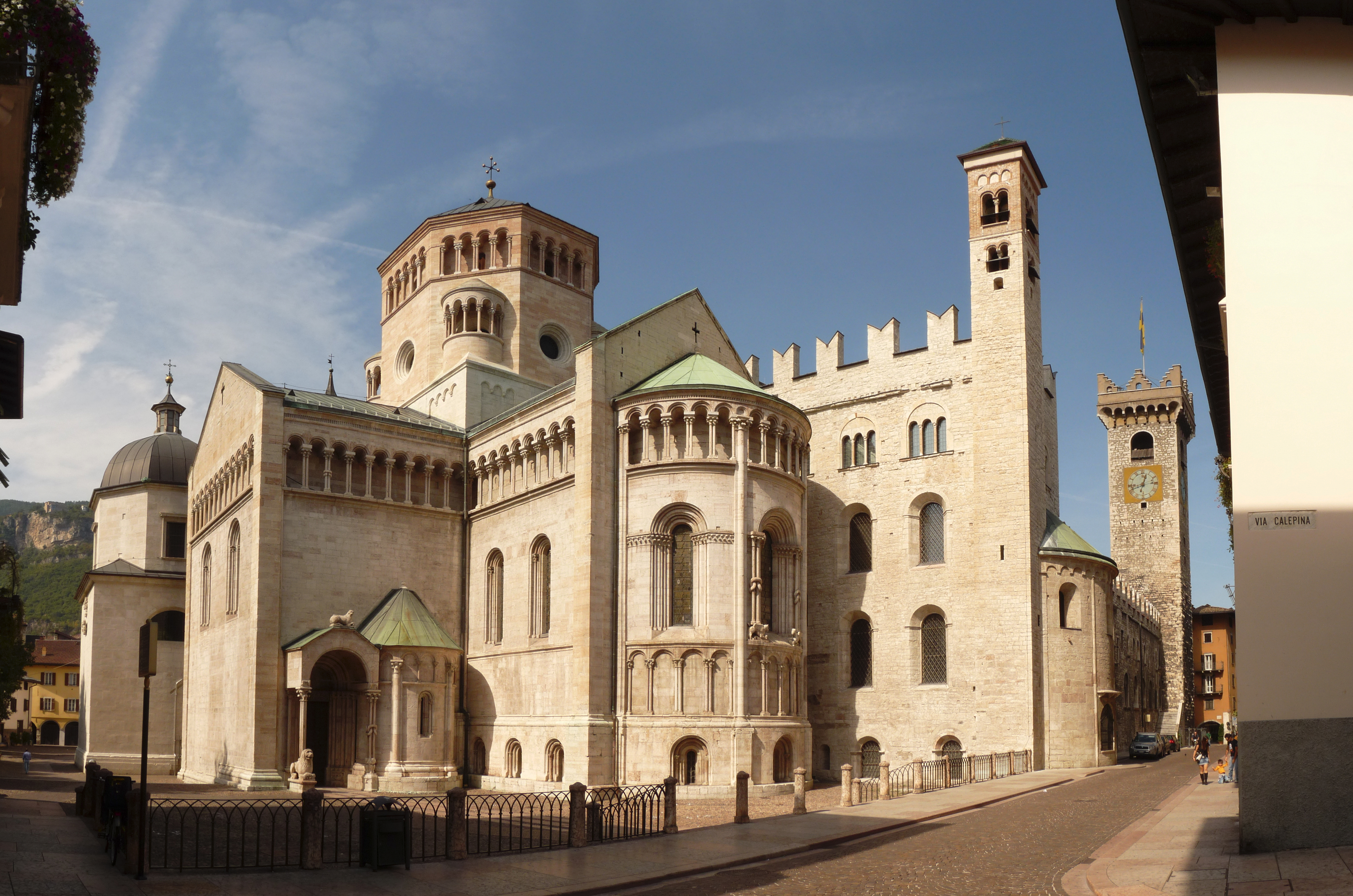
The cathedral seen from the southeast; from left: the Chapel of the Crucifix, the southern transept with its prothyrum and apsidole, the lantern, the choir with the main apse, the Bishop’s Castelletto with the San Romedio bell tower, the sacristy apse, and finally the Civic Tower at the end of the Palazzo Pretorio.

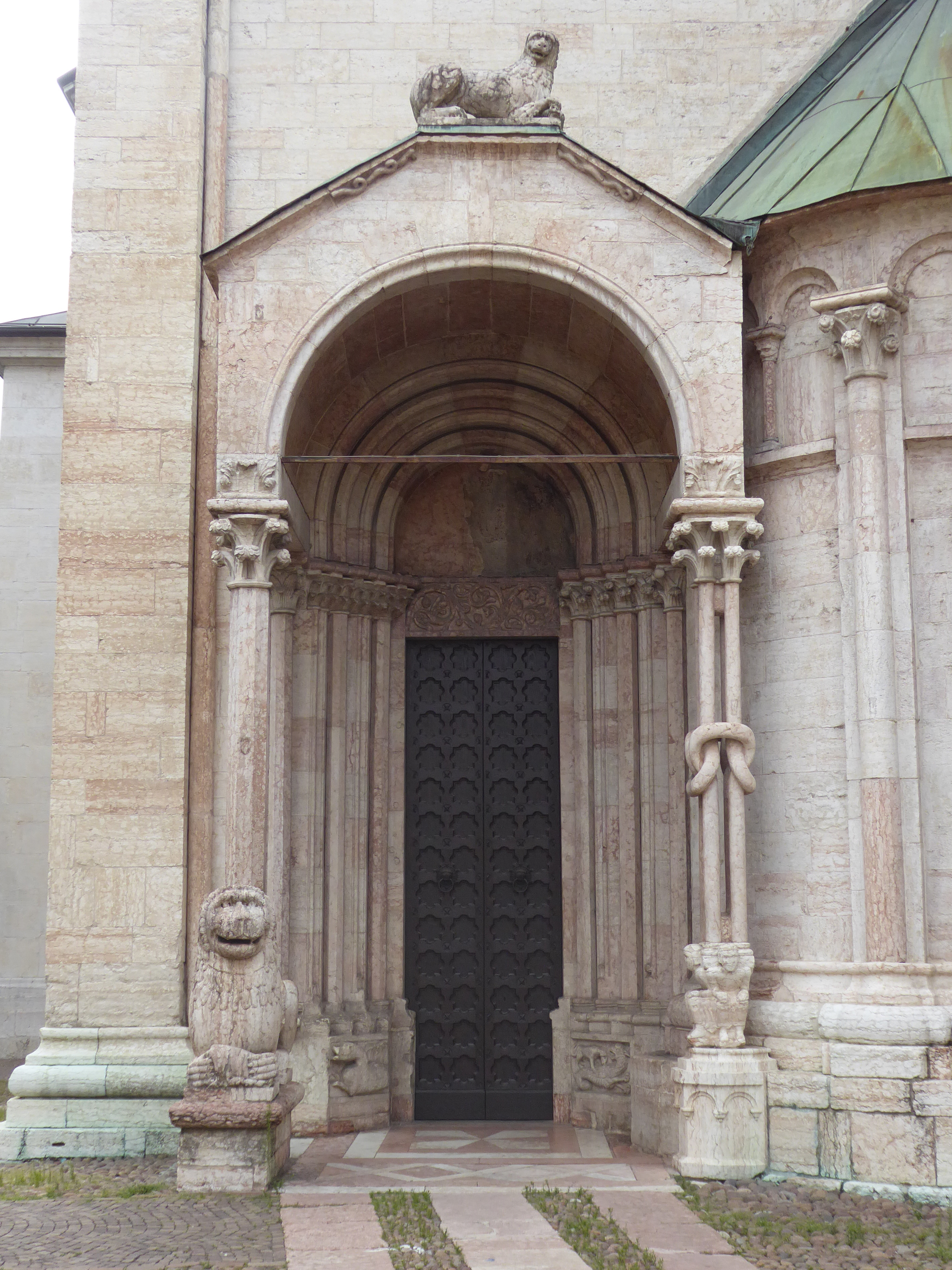
The southern prothyrum.

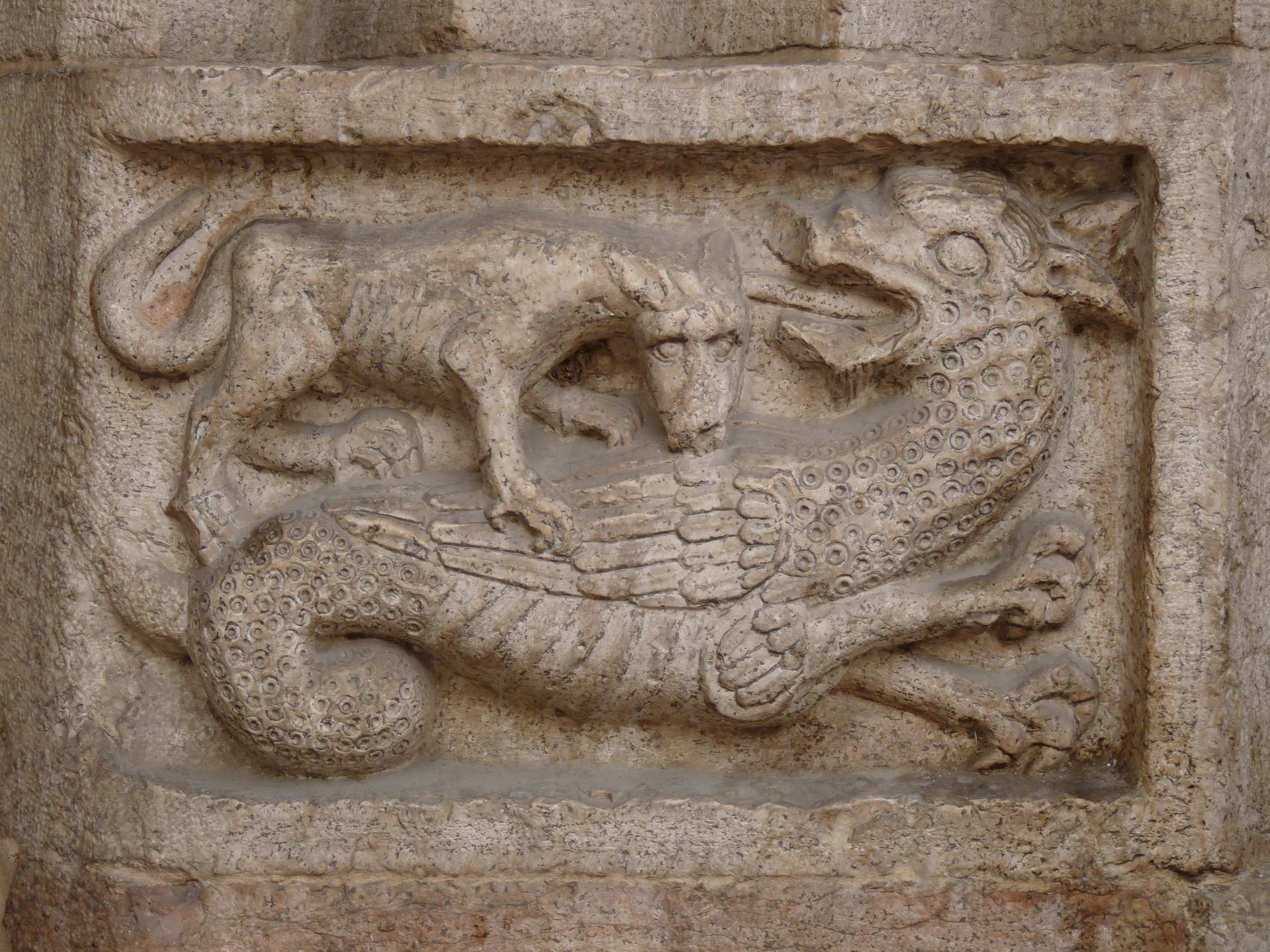
Relief with a wyvern attacked by a wolf or dog next to the southern porch portal.

On the right side, the wall of the minor nave is characterized by a sequence of pilasters and Lombard bands with animal and human protomes, and four monoforas: one on what would have been the shaft of the second bell tower, and the others corresponding to the third, fourth, and fifth bays. There is also a bas-relief with the Castelbarco coat of arms, depicting a lion. The masonry of the main nave is identical to that on the northern side of the cathedral.

At the sixth bay, the square volume of the Chapel of the Crucifix protrudes, featuring lunette windows on the east and west sides, an octagonal lantern with three rectangular windows on the east, south, and west sides, and a small dome with a lantern. The upper part is similar to the appearance of the 16th-century "Clesian dome". The only decorative element, affixed to the southern wall, is a cartouche with the episcopal coat of arms of the patron, Francesco Alberti Poja.

Almost immediately after the chapel, the southern arm of the transept emerges, with a gallery running up to the apse and two monoforas on the main facade. Unlike the northern arm, the semicircular apsidole is visible here, equipped with a stepped and molded base and decorated with a pattern of small arches supported by lesenes, with a single, centrally arched, and splayed window. However, the apsidole is overshadowed by the cathedral’s second prothyrum, which connects to the transept on its left, featuring a rich sculptural ensemble attributed to a Comacine workshop active during the episcopate of Egno von Eppan. It includes an octagonal column on a column-bearing lion, knotted columns resting on three telamons, a small lion at the ridge of the gables, and bas-reliefs with lions and dragons near the portal’s base. A third lateral entrance, in Romanesque style with a blind lunette, is squeezed between the transept and the Chapel of the Crucifix; the surrounding walls are adorned with tombstones (removed from the cathedral floor in the 19th century), bas-reliefs, and a large inscription in Gothic script commemorating Jacobus Comes, a member of the Appiano family. The lunette of this portal is frescoed with an image of the Madonna and Child from the second half of the 14th century; it was covered in the 15th century by a new fresco of the same subject, detached in 1924-25 and now preserved at the Buonconsiglio.

The facade concludes with the choir's space, featuring two monoforas on the south side and a double-pitched roof, ending in the semicircular main apse. This is divided vertically into three sections by pilasters with attached lesenes and horizontally into four levels: the lower level has small monoforas opening onto the crypt; the second features a pattern of small arches resting on paired columns with Corinthian capitals; the third contains large round-arched monoforas, the central one distinguished by knotted columns supported by griffins seizing their prey (crafted by the same artist as the southern prothyrum); the fourth is occupied by the usual walkable gallery, which here continues, connecting both transept arms. Two inscriptions are present, both in the southeastern corner: the first commemorates Archdeacon Bonifacio di Castelbarco (d. 1238), and the second commemorates builder Adamo d’Arogno. Both mark the location of the family tomb.

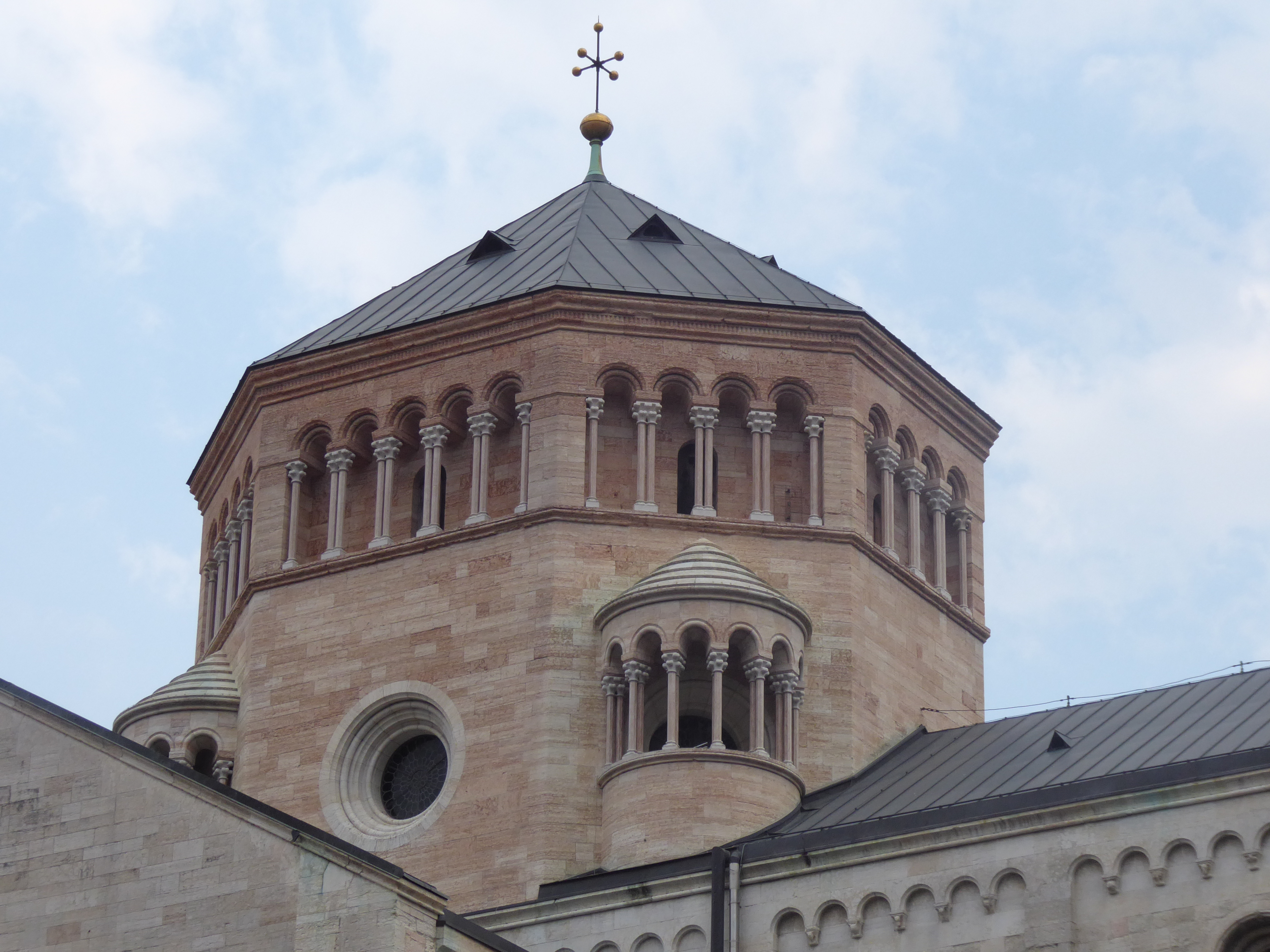
The lantern.

Beyond the main apse rises the Castelletto of the Palazzo Pretorio, which houses the cathedral’s sacristies, with the only externally visible part being the apse, derived from the ancient San Biagio chapel, now the sacristy of relics. In the outer wall of the apse, facing Via Garibaldi, a niche closed by a metal grate contains a fresco of the Madonna and Child between two unidentified saints (or saintesses): the image was retraced around 1860, a restoration removed in 1989.

== Lantern ==
Between the two transept arms stands the octagonal lantern housing the dome, a Neo-Romanesque structure from the late 19th century that replaced the 16th-century "Clesian dome." The lower part is pierced by splayed oculi on the four cardinal sides, while semicircular niches emerge from the diagonal sides; colonnaded galleries run atop the niches and along the entire upper half of the lantern. A multi-molded cornice supports the eight-pitched roof, topped with a sphere and cross.

The previous "Clesian dome," completed in 1515, was also octagonal but lacked niches and the gallery, featuring an order of triforas on each side in the upper part, paired with the biforas of the bell tower; the roof was a hemispherical segmented cap surmounted by a lantern housing the "canons’ bell". Cast in 1463 to commemorate a danger averted by the city (Sigismund of Austria intended to attack Trento to avenge Bishop Georg Hack, forced to flee due to a popular uprising, but the assault never occurred), this bell was previously hung among the merlons of the Castelletto. Spared from requisitions during World War I due to its antiquity, it is now preserved at the Diocesan Museum.

== Interior ==
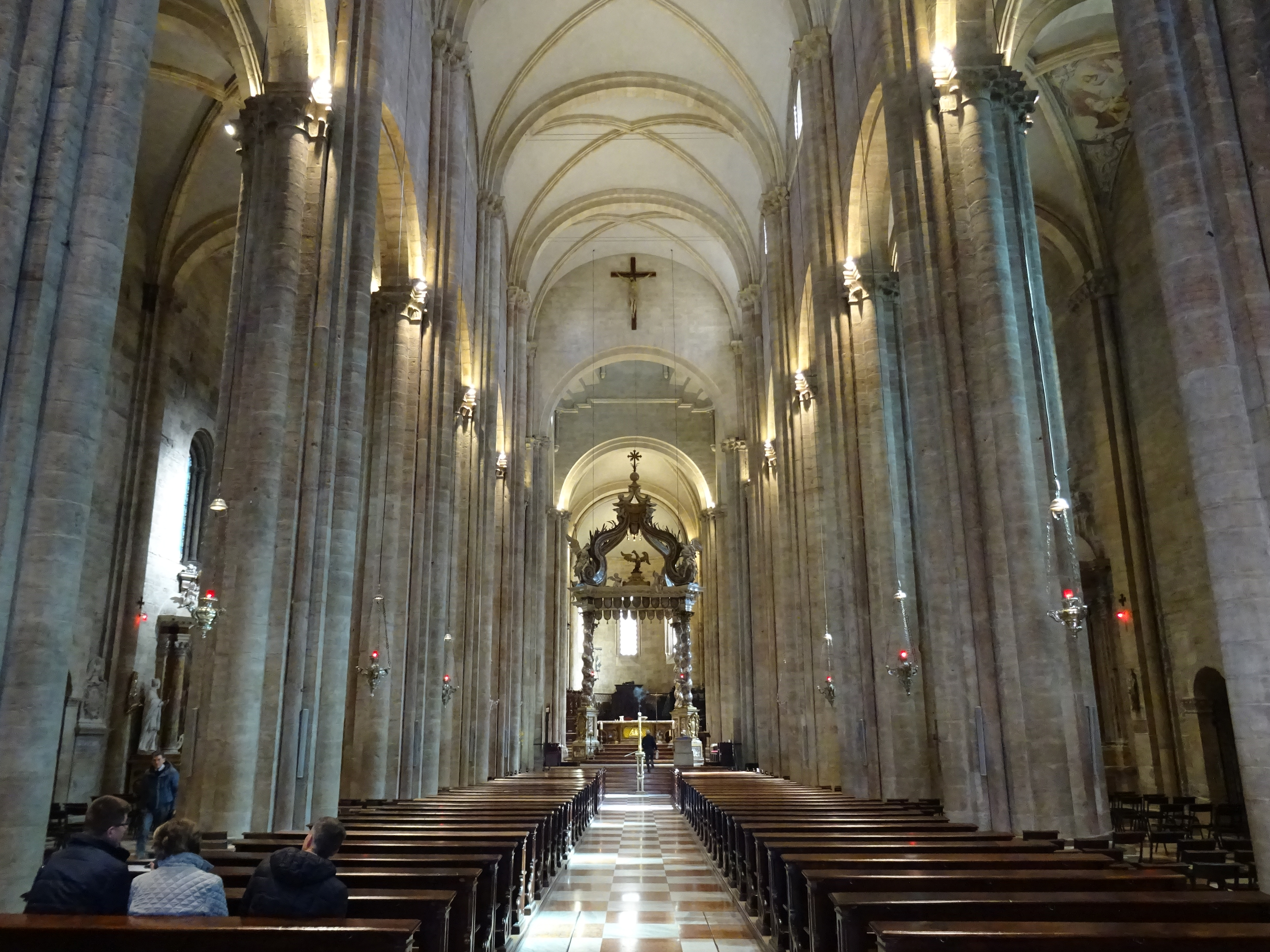
The interior seen from the main entrance.

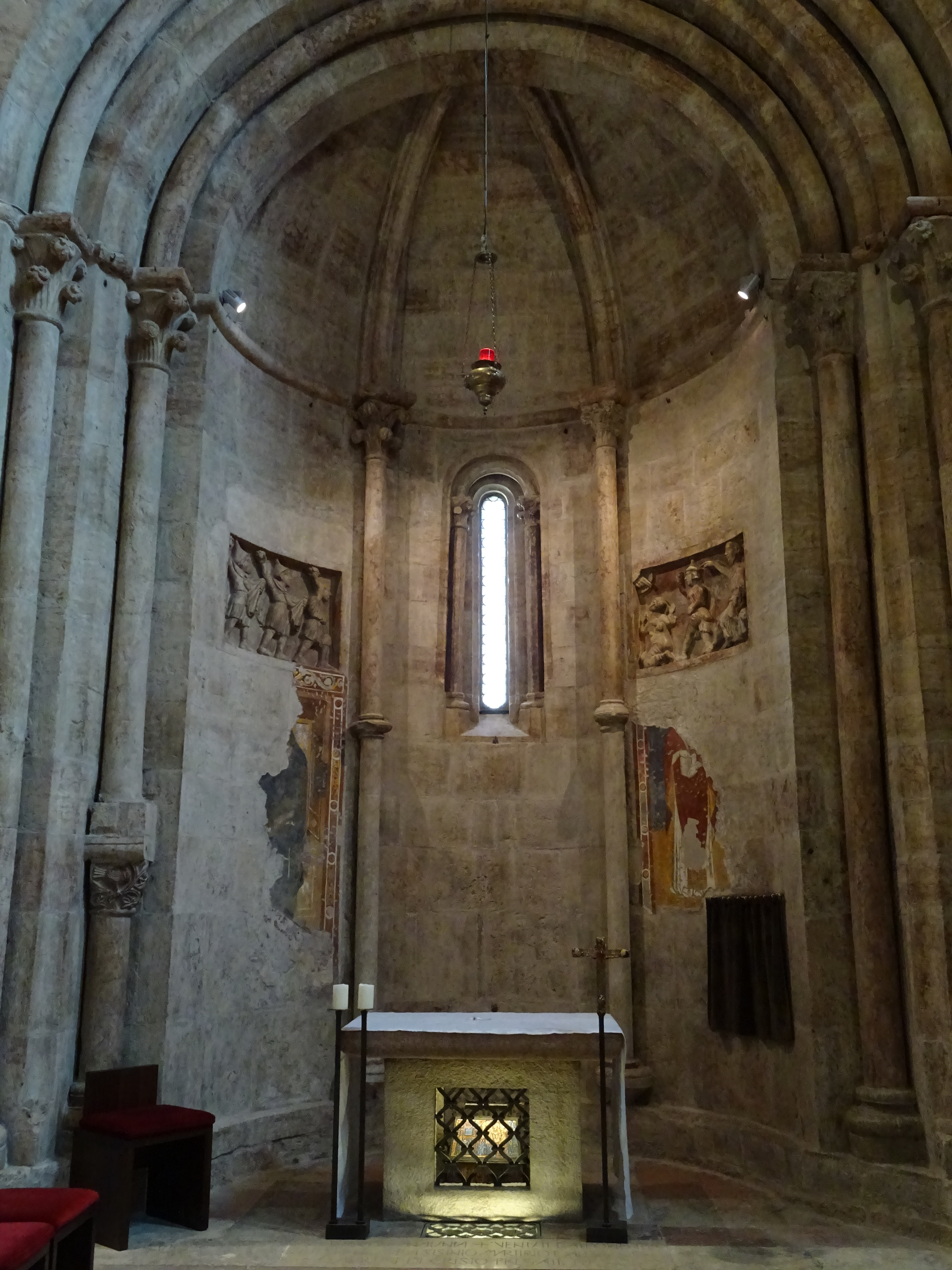
The right apsidole with the altar of the Martyrs of Anaunia.

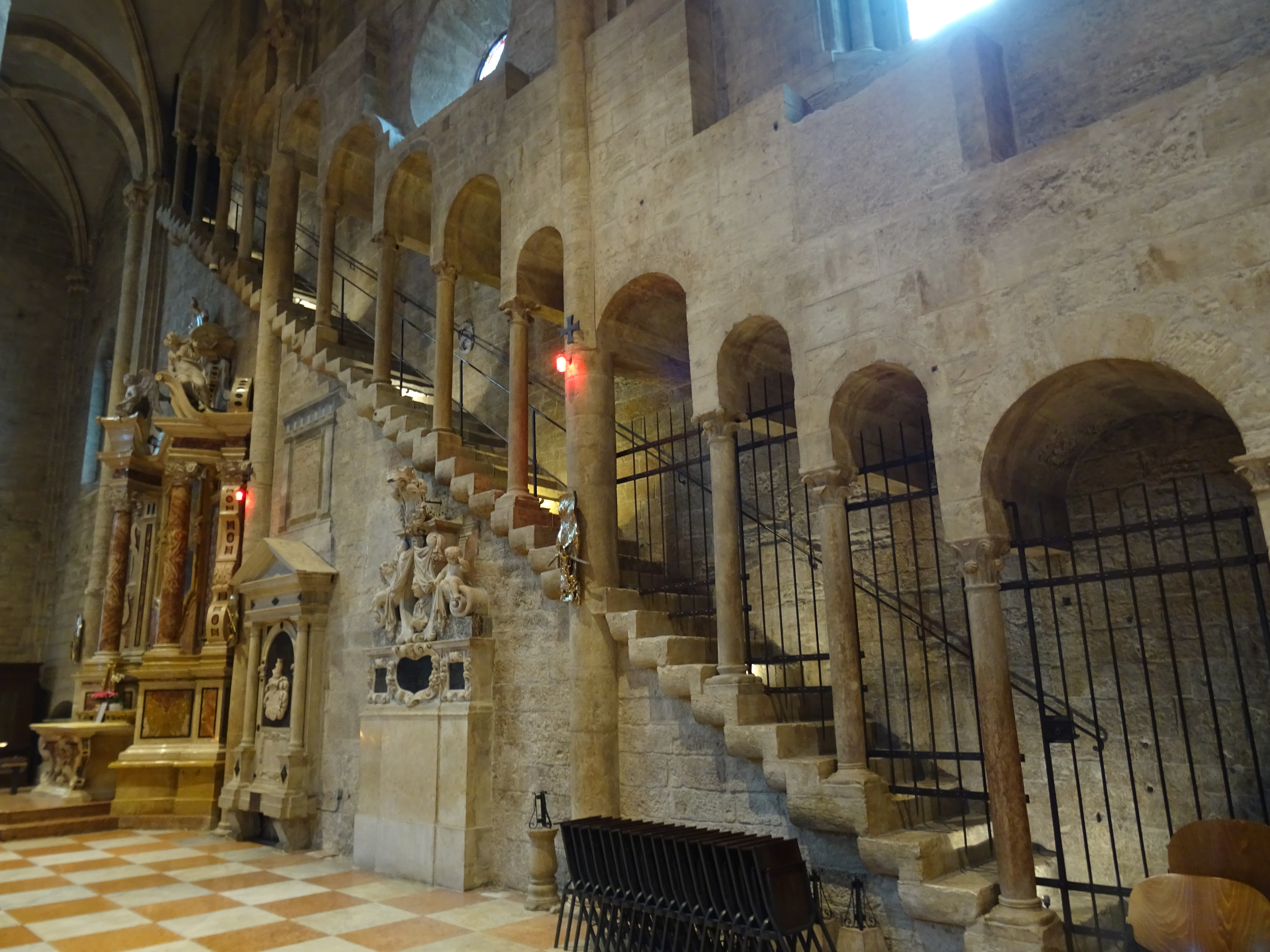
The staircase to the bell tower in the northern nave.

Though it was shaped over the course of a century, the cathedral’s interior blends the original Romanesque forms harmoniously with the Gothic influences that affected its later construction. The space is divided into three naves of seven bays each, with ribbed vaulting. The central nave is defined by slender bundle pillars supporting lowered arches, while the lower lateral naves connect to the side walls with piers and semicolumns. The original plan likely envisioned a narrower entrance, consisting of a narthex flanked by the bases of two bell towers; instead, the first bay extends across the building’s full width, one reason the second bell tower was never built, necessitating the addition of a rood screen with a structural function attached to the counterfacade.

The minor naves feature two unusual sloping staircases with arches and small columns, carved into the wall’s thickness, ascending backward from the fourth to the first bay; the left one leads to the bell tower and the external galleries. In the sixth bay of the right nave, the Chapel of the Crucifix opens, and in the seventh, there is the southern exit and access to the spiral staircase leading to the apsidal galleries, through a small lunette portal with a relief of a leaping ram. The nave flooring consists of square limestone tiles in white and red, arranged in a checkerboard pattern, extending to the transept, apse, and part of the choir. On the last two columns of the central nave, facing the presbytery, are two 18th-century plaques: the southern one commemorates the works of 1739-40, the northern one recalls (with some inaccuracies) the Council of Trent.

The naves end at the transept with relatively short arms, also rib-vaulted, each with a minor apse on the eastern wall; the transept is rich in 13th- and 14th-century frescoes. The northern arm, housing the baptismal font crafted by Francesco Oradini, serves as a baptistery, and also provides access to the archaeological area of the Paleochristian Basilica, as well as the original statue of the Madonna of the Drowned, relocated here from its external niche. Attributed to Adamo d'Arogno, it owes its name to the fact that the bodies recovered from the Adige River were laid out in front of it awaiting identification.

The northern apsidal chapel is dedicated to Saint John the Evangelist and features a monofora, placed on the left side because the remaining space was obscured by the Castelletto’s structure. The masonry includes two carved panels depicting King Herod and the martyrdom of Saint John in boiling oil. In a niche to the right of the altar is a casket containing a relic of Saint Pauline Visintainer. The southern apse, significantly smaller, is dedicated to Saint Stephen, whose martyrdom by stoning is depicted in two carved panels on either side of the window, works in the Antelamic style from the first half of the 13th century. On the left, halfway up a column, a capital from the church of Altemanno (1124-1149) is reused, featuring vegetal scrolls and a bird. The apse houses an altar for weekday functions, dedicated to the three holy martyrs Sisinnius, Martyrius, and Alexander. Their relics are preserved in two bronze caskets, one inside the altar and the other in a compartment in the floor in front, both crafted in 1966 by Don Luciano Carnessali (1928-2003).

The presbytery, dominated by the imposing Baroque main altar, is raised by five or six steps, paved with rectangular red and pink limestone slabs, and extends to occupy the central part of the transept; two more steps lead to the choir and main apse, while three lead to the sacristies. Behind the presbytery, the choir space opens, ending with the large main apse; it is furnished with two rows of twelve seats and the central episcopal throne, all 18th-century and made of walnut wood. The chair backs feature carved panels depicting various angelic appearances narrated in the Bible.

== Altars ==
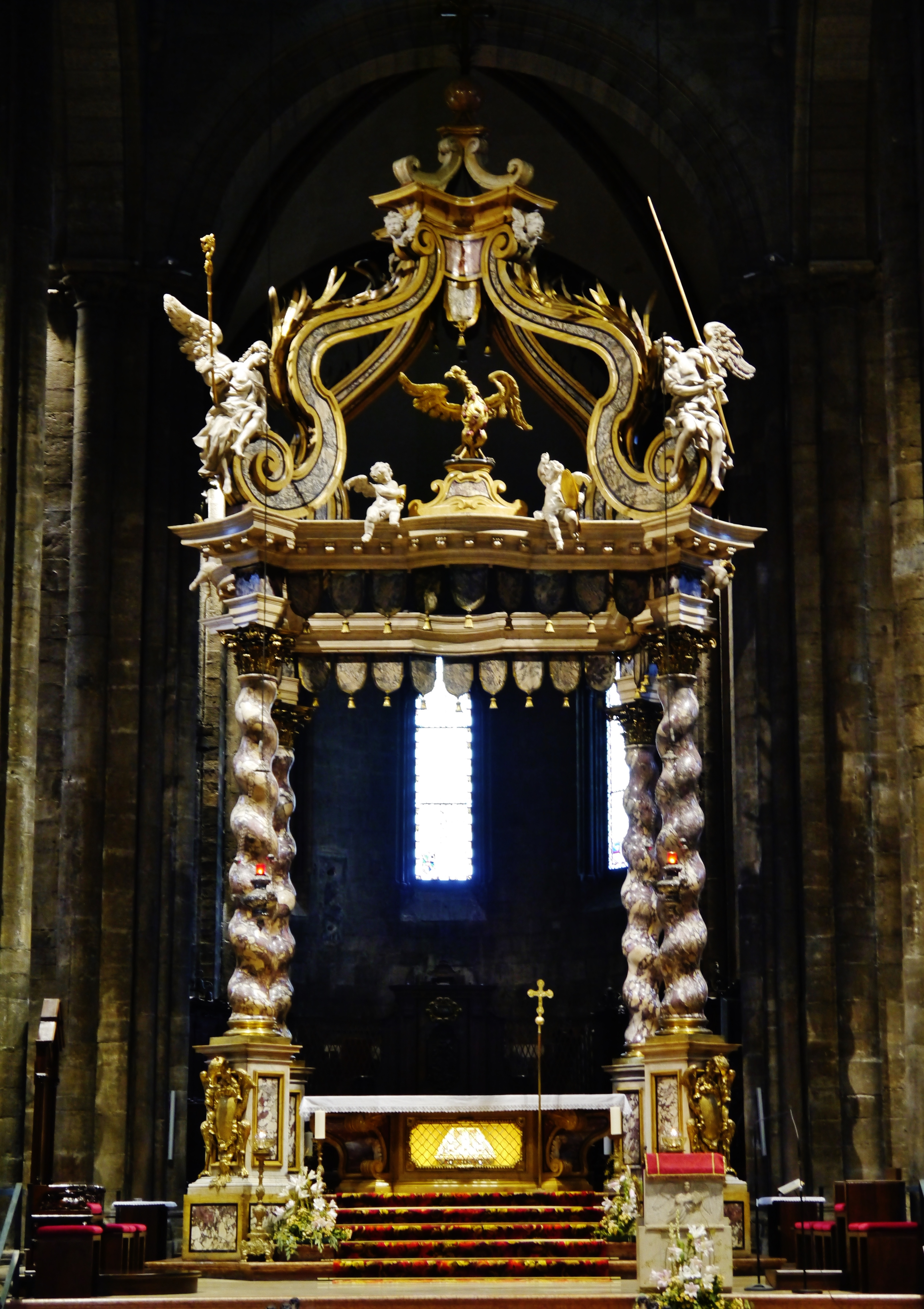
The main altar with the large Baroque baldacchin.

The cathedral houses several altars: in addition to the main altar, there are four in the naves (two in the right and two in the left), in addition to the altar of the Chapel of the Crucifix and the small altar of the Martyrs of Anaunia in the southern apse. Historically, there were many more altars: 13th-century documents mention a dozen (dedicated to Saints Agatha, Agnes, Andrew, Catherine, Dorothea, George, the Holy Innocents, Lawrence, Maxentia, the Martyrs of Anaunia, the Trinity, and Anthony); in the late 16th century, as many as twenty-two are attested (the main altar, Saint Agnes, Augustine of Hippo, Saint Andrew, the Annunciation, Saint Anthony, the Assumption, Saint Catherine, Saint Christopher, the Holy Cross, Saint Dorothea, Saint Fiorentius, Jerome, Gotthard, the Holy Innocents, Saint Maxentia in the Crypt, Nicholas, Saints Peter and Paul, Saint Sisinnius, Saint Stephen, the Holy Trinity, and All Saints), and at that time, the walls were so crowded with funerary monuments that some altars had to be placed against the central nave’s pillars (and one, that of the Holy Cross, at the nave’s end, in front of the crypt’s access arches). From the 17th century, their number began to decline, though fourteen were still counted in 1673, and fifteen in 1734 (the main altar, Saint Catherine, Saint Christopher, Holy Crucifix, Saint Dominic, Saint Fiorentius, Leonard, Saint Maxentia, Saint Stephen, the Blessed Virgin in the choir, the Madonna of the Baptistery, the Madonna of the Column, the Madonna of the Bells, Our Lady of Sorrows, and the Holy Trinity).

Over time, many historical altars were destroyed, with their relics recovered and relocated, but some were transferred to other churches: this is the case for those of the lateral apses, dedicated to Saint Maxentia and the Immaculate Conception, removed in the 1960s and given to the Church of the Holy Trinity (the 18th-century altar frontal of the latter features two depictions of the cathedral with both bell towers), and that of the Madonna of the Rosary, transferred with its altarpiece to the Parish Church of the Madonna del Carmine in Sarche.

=== Main altar ===
The main altar is located at the center of the presbytery, between the two transept arms: it is an imposing 18th-century Baroque structure, one of the few remaining testimonies of the expansion undertaken to fulfill the public vow made during the siege of 1703. Cristoforo Benedetti of Castione designed the altar, which was clearly inspired by St. Peter's Baldachin and drew details from other works by Bernini. However, during the process, Don Francesco Sartori managed to secure the commission for his family. The work was thus carried out by Domenico and Antonio Sartori, assisted by various relatives, and Benedetti was not even mentioned in the inscription within the baldacchin’s entablature.

The altar table, raised on five red stone steps, contains the casket with the relics of Saint Vigilius; it is symmetrical, allowing the celebrant, even at the time, to face the congregation. The centerpiece of the altar is the baldacchin, for which the presbytery’s floor level was lowered by demolishing the ancient crypt. The base consists of four plinths at the corners of the staircase, each with a golden eagle affixed to the outermost face: the eagles bear inscriptions on their chests: D.O.M. / IN HON. BBMM / VIGILII / ET / ADELPRETI / EPP. TRID. (northwest); OB URBEM / CONTRA / GALLOS / SERVATAM / AN. MDCCIII (northeast); VOTUM / PUB. / SOLVIT / LUBENS / MERITO (southwest); S.P.Q. / TRIDENT. / ANNO / DOMINI / MDCCXLIII (southeast). (Note: Together, the inscriptions form the altar’s dedication: D(eo) O(ptimo) M(aximo) in hon(orem) b(eatorum) m(artyrum) Vigilii et Adelpreti ep(iscoporum) Trid(entinorum) ob urbem contra Gallos servatam an(no) MDCCIII votum pub(licum) solvit lubens merito S(enatus) P(opulus)q(ue) Trident(inus) anno Domini MDCCXLIII. To God, the Best and Greatest, in honor of the blessed martyrs Vigilius and Adelpreto, bishops of Trento, for the salvation of the city against the French in the year 1703, the Senate and People of Trento joyfully and deservedly fulfill the public vow in the year of our Lord 1743. — Benedetto Bonelli (1765). Monumenta Ecclesiae Tridentinae [Monuments of the Church of Trent]. Vol. III 2. Trent: ex typographia episcopali Joannis Baptistae Monauni. p. 259 for the Latin text) From the plinths rise Solomonic columns with Corinthian capitals; atop them rests the entablature, framed in gilded copper, and, facing west, the Eagle of Saint Wenceslas, symbol of Trento, sculpted by Francesco Oradini. Above the cornice, the baldacchin’s top rises with dolphin-back arches ending in curls, adorned with gilded wooden palm branches, united at the top by a curvilinear element with a sphere and cross. The baldacchin is decorated with various sculptures of angels holding episcopal insignia and putti bearing the symbols of Saint Vigilius and Blessed Adelpreto; these statues are by Oradini, except for the two eastern putti, crafted by Giovan Battista Fattori.

=== Side altars ===
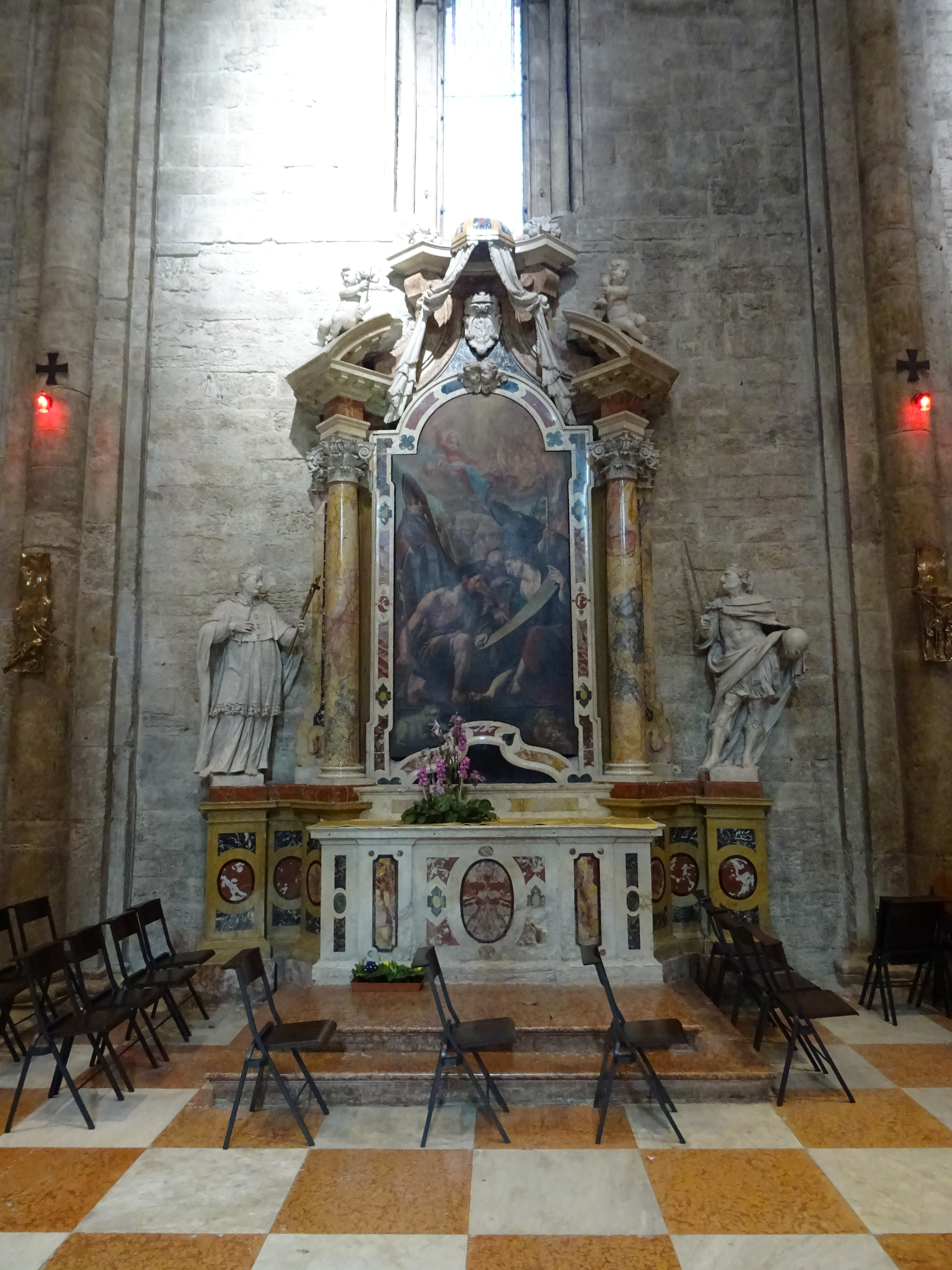
The Altar of the Assumption.

The two lateral naves house four altars and various funerary monuments. In the second bay of the southern nave stands the majestic 18th-century altar of Our Lady of Sorrows, also a work of the Sartori brothers, a replacement for a pre-existing wooden altar commissioned by Canon Bartolomeo Bortolazzi. With a style that straddles the Baroque and Neoclassical, the structure is crowned by a broken pediment adorned with golden rays and sculptures of putti. Above the altar table is a marble urn that housed the relics of the Martyrs of Anaunia, Saint Maxentia, and Saints Claudianus and Magorianus from 1739 until their relocation; in the niche stands a wooden statue of Our Lady of Sorrows, dressed in richly decorated garments and accompanied by two additional putti.

Opposite, in the northern nave, is the altar of Saint Anthony, with a 19th-century altarpiece by Domenico Udine depicting the saint with the Child Jesus. An altar dedicated to the saint is mentioned as early as 1382, but in 1572 it was decommissioned and merged with another dedicated to the Holy Trinity; the current altar, another Baroque marble work by the Sartori brothers, was brought to the cathedral from the Church of San Lorenzo (where it was dedicated to Saint Vincent).

In the fifth bay of the southern nave is the altar of Saint Anne, about which little historical information exists; built between the first and second quarters of the 17th century, possibly by Mattia Carneri, it is first mentioned in 1673. Later, two coats of arms of the Manci family were affixed to the column bases, certainly after 1770 (the reason for this addition is unknown). The altarpiece contains an early 16th-century painting attributed to Fogolino, depicting Saint Anne with the Virgin and Child between Saint Nicholas and Saint Vigilius.

Opposite the altar of Saint Anne is the Altar of the Assumption, dated 1695, commissioned by provost Carlo Ferdinando Lodron to Cristoforo Benedetti. It is crowned by a marble drapery with putti holding a cross and chalice, flanked by statues of Saint Charles and Saint Ferdinand. The altarpiece, by Nicolò Dorigati, depicts the Assumption with numerous saints, including Simon at the head of the Holy Innocents, John the Baptist, Mark, Saint Vigilius, Rupert, Saint Peter, Henry, Leopold III, and Saint Fulgentius.

== Internal frescoes ==
Since its construction in the 13th century, frescoes have adorned the interior walls of the cathedral. The figures, arranged on multiple levels and reaching several meters in height, were originally visible up close thanks to wooden lofts and similar structures. Over the centuries, little care was shown toward these images, so today, few remain. Most of those that do remain are fragmentary and are located in the two transept arms. From the 16th century through the 19th century, the erection and relocation of cenotaphs and altars damaged or destroyed several images, not to mention those lost due to structural changes, such as the alterations to the floor levels in the 18th and 19th centuries. From the 19th century, critical interest began to focus on the Saint Julian cycle (though not always studied accurately, as a 1835 guide mistook it for stories about Margaret), while other frescoes remained largely ignored until Nicolò Rasmo’s intervention in the second half of the 20th century.

=== Southern transept ===
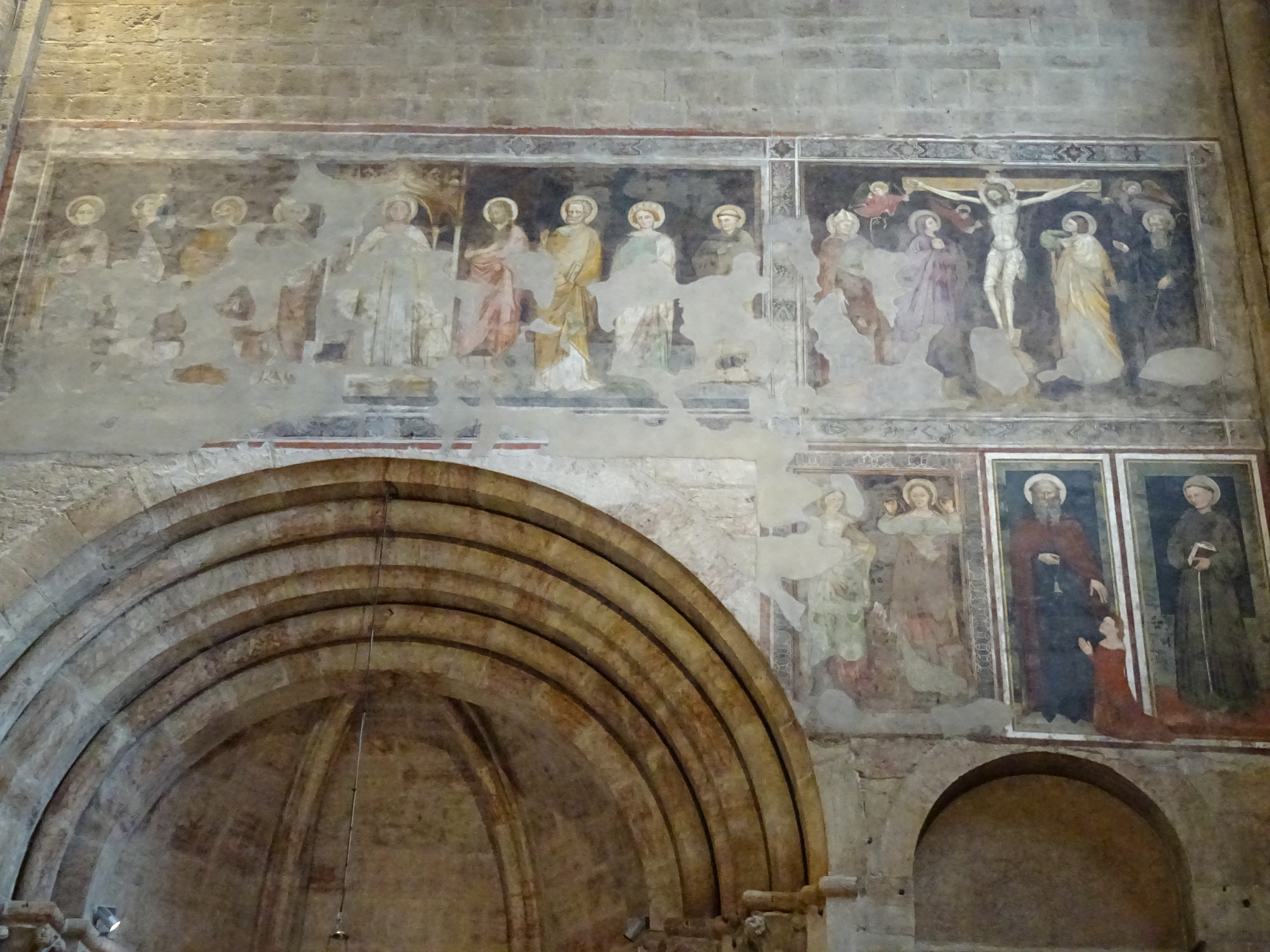
The frescoes above the apsidal chapel of the right transept.

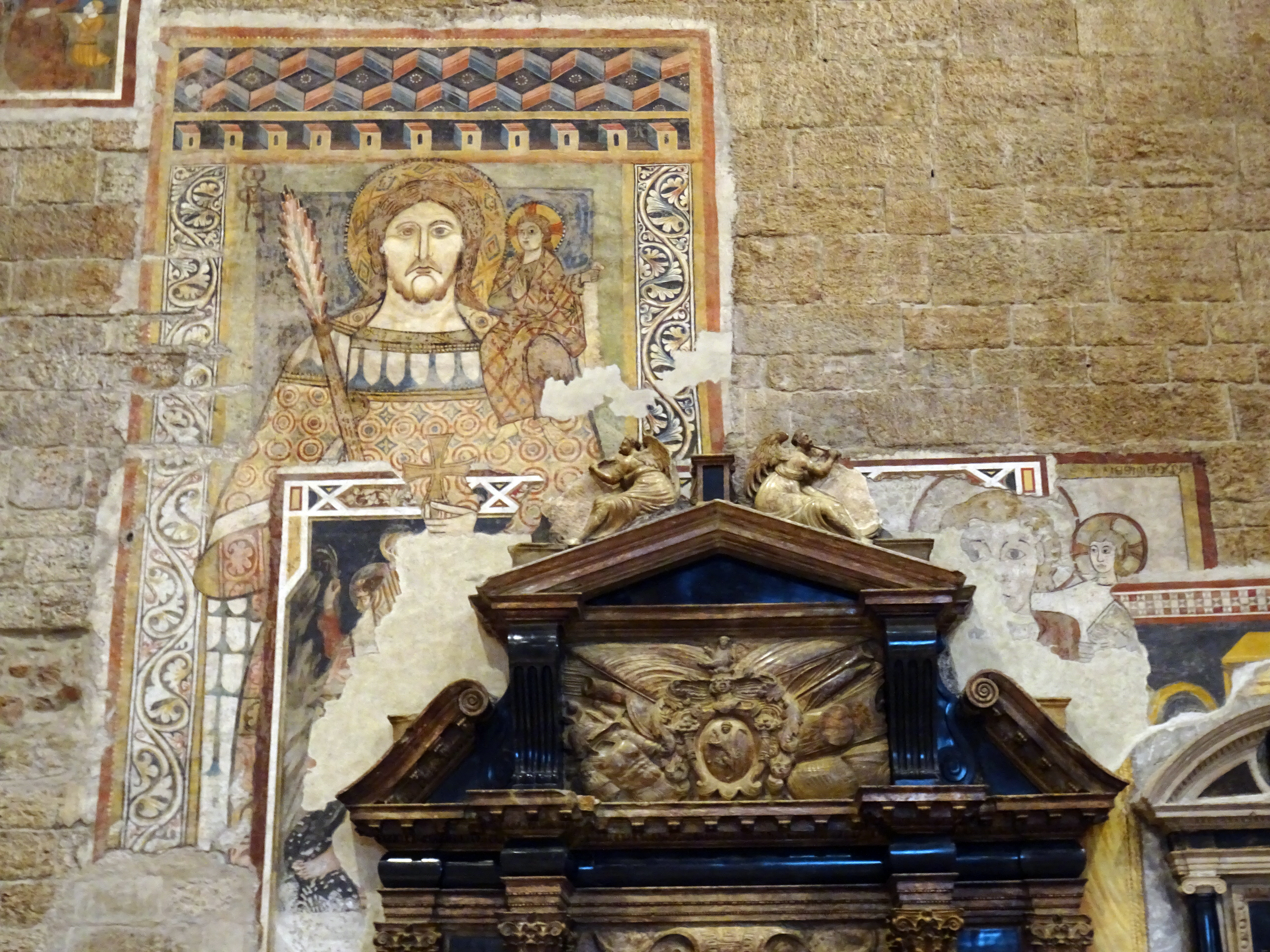
The various frescoes of Saint Christopher in the right transept.

In the southern transept arm, on the main wall, three different depictions of Saint Christopher are found, linked to the former presence of a door in that position and possibly an altar dedicated to the saint. The most visible, to the left above the Lodron funerary monument, is a striking image from around 1290, in Veronese style: the saint, with a pearl-bordered halo and the Child Jesus on his shoulder, wears a robe with a concentric circle pattern, holding the martyr’s palm and a golden cross. It is framed by two bands with vegetal rinceaux on the sides and two with colorful three-dimensional geometric motifs above; near the palm, a small haloed figure is visible, possibly a sketch of an earlier design covered by a layer of paint that later fell off. Just to the right of the Lodron monument, a small fragment (part of the saint’s beardless face and part of the Child) of another Saint Christopher from the mid-13th century, the oldest fresco in the cathedral, is comparable to other Romanesque works from the South Tyrol area. Both frescoes were covered by a third late-14th-century panel, also depicting Saint Christopher and presumably other saints; much of it, along with parts of the underlying frescoes, was destroyed with the placement of the Lodron monument. Higher up, in the left corner, is a square panel with the mystic marriage of Saint Catherine, by a Lombard artist, from around 1370.

On the other two walls of the southern transept, votive images abound, linked to the presence of family tombs and cenotaphs. On the western wall, only fragmentary frescoes survive, many illegible; the best-preserved, by a Veronese painter from around 1340, is a Madonna and Child enthroned, with kneeling donors at their feet and four saints on the sides: to the left, a woman with a book in monastic attire (possibly Saint Clare or Saint Monica) and Saint Julian of Anazarbus, naked and covered with snakes, and to the right, now unrecognizable, a figure with a book and another with a book or box. Above Roberto Sanseverino’s tombstone appears a fragment of Saint Andrew, from the second half of the 14th century.

On the eastern wall, above the apsidal chapel, a series of late-14th-century images in the Venetian style stand out: first, a large fresco of the Madonna of Mercy, with donors under her mantle and eight saints, four on the right (John the Baptist, Peter, Catherine, and Anthony the Abbot) and four on the left (only the one closest to her, Saint Vigilius, is recognizable). Next is a Crucifixion with Mary, Saint John, Saint Vigilius, and Anthony the Abbot; in the lower register, two unidentified saintesses with the donor’s figure. Finally, older and likely by a Lombard artist, two panels depict Anthony the Abbot and Anthony of Padua with the kneeling donor at the former’s feet.

=== Northern transept ===
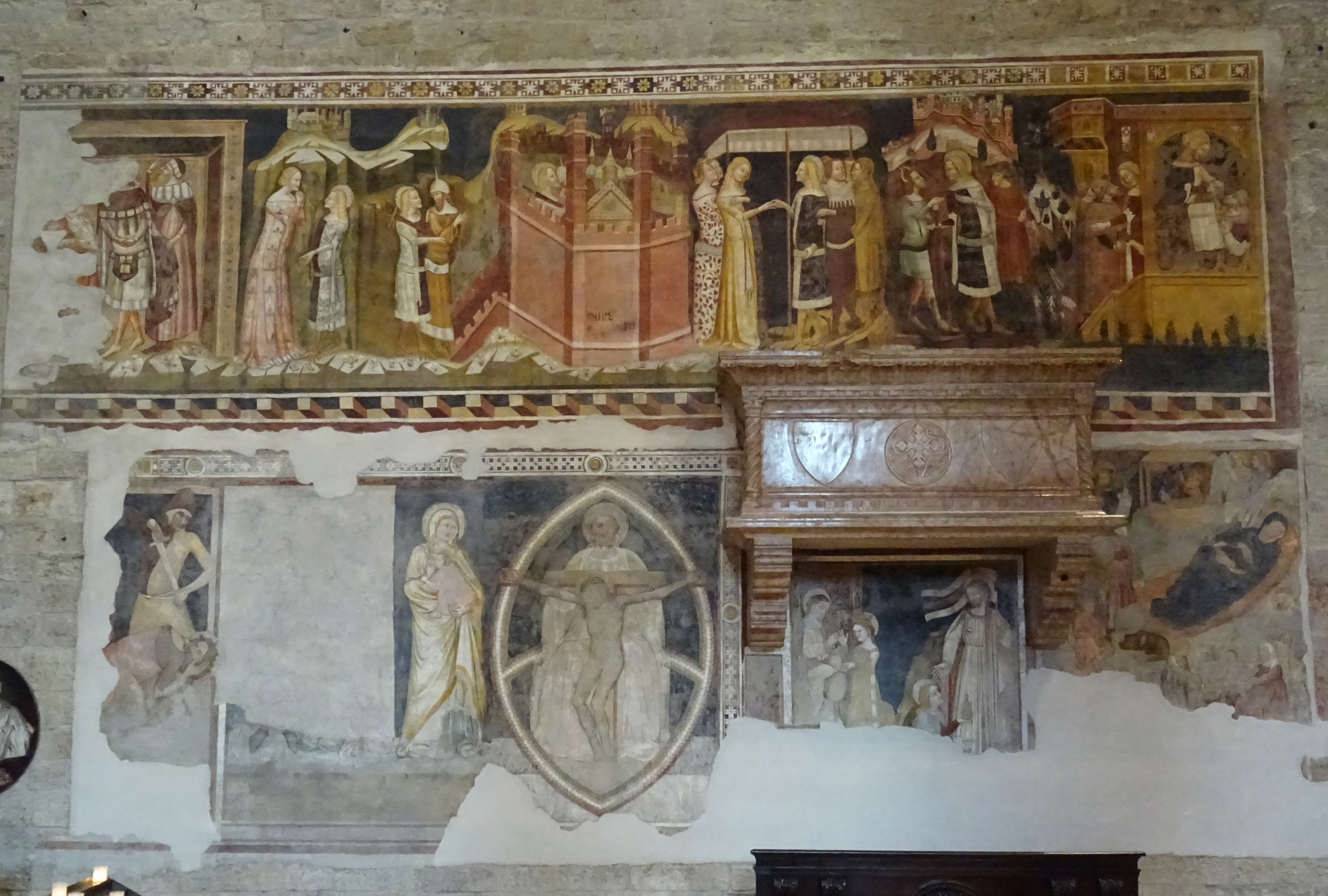
The frescoes of the left transept arm with the cycle of Saint Julian by Monte di Bologna.

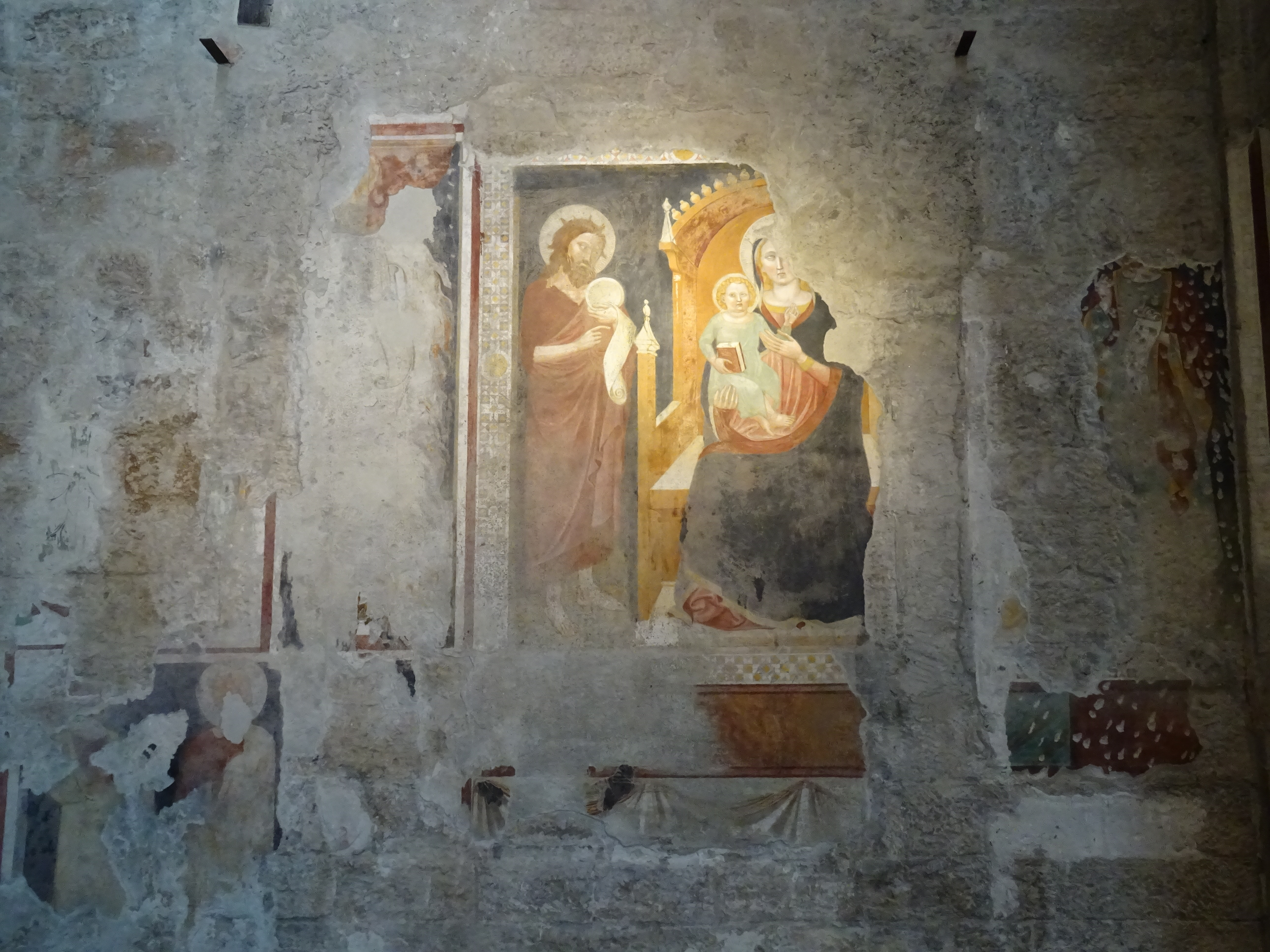
The Majesty in the left nave, uncovered after the 2022 restorations.

In the northern transept arm, many frescoes cluster around a sepulchral ark: dating to the early 13th century, it predates the frescoes, but its placement date there is unknown, and the surrounding images, though appearing to follow its outline, are slightly eroded. In the upper band is painted the cathedral’s most famous cycle, the legend of Saint Julian, a mid-14th-century work by Monte di Bologna, an obscure artist who was possibly a follower of Vitale da Bologna. It is articulated in seven scenes, including the ominous prophecy at the saint’s birth, the farewell to his mother, the meeting with the king, the marriage to the princess, the temptation by the devil, and the killing of his parents. The figures, dressed in colorful garments rich in detail, move against a backdrop of castles and urban landscapes.

Below, to the left of the ark, are a rather degraded Beheading of John the Baptist, a Nursing Madonna, and a Thronum Gratiae, interspersed with a large empty space. These images result from successive interventions over an original fresco likely depicting a group of saints, of which only fragments of feet and cloaks and a Cosmati-style frieze framing the current group remain. The Nursing Madonna (1330–40, reusing part of an earlier figure, as evident from the distinct appearance of her lower cloak) was painted first, followed immediately by the Beheading and then the Trinity, dated to around 1360. Between the ark’s two brackets are the mystic marriage of Saint Catherine and the Noli me tangere, the appearance of the risen Jesus to Mary Magdalene. To the right of the ark, in a Veronese and Giottesque style, are scenes of the Nativity of Jesus (including the Annunciation to the Shepherds and the Child’s first bath) and the Death of the Virgin, the only survivors of a broader cycle of Mary’s life. Higher up on the right, a final image by a Lombard artist from 1340-1350 shows two saintly bishops: possibly Saint Nicholas on the left, in a blessing pose with an ivory pastoral staff, and a youthful Saint Vigilius on the right, holding a book.

Some frescoes are also present in the apsidal chapel: at the center, by a Venetian painter from the late 13th century and heavily degraded, a group depicts the Crucifixion, Saint John, and a crowned figure, possibly Saint Helena or an allegory of the Church. This was covered by another 14th-century Veronese Crucifixion (with Mary, John, the Magdalene, and four other praying saints), detached and now preserved in the canons’ sacristy. On the right side, in early 13th-century Veronese style, is Saint Catherine with another saintess.

=== Other frescoes ===
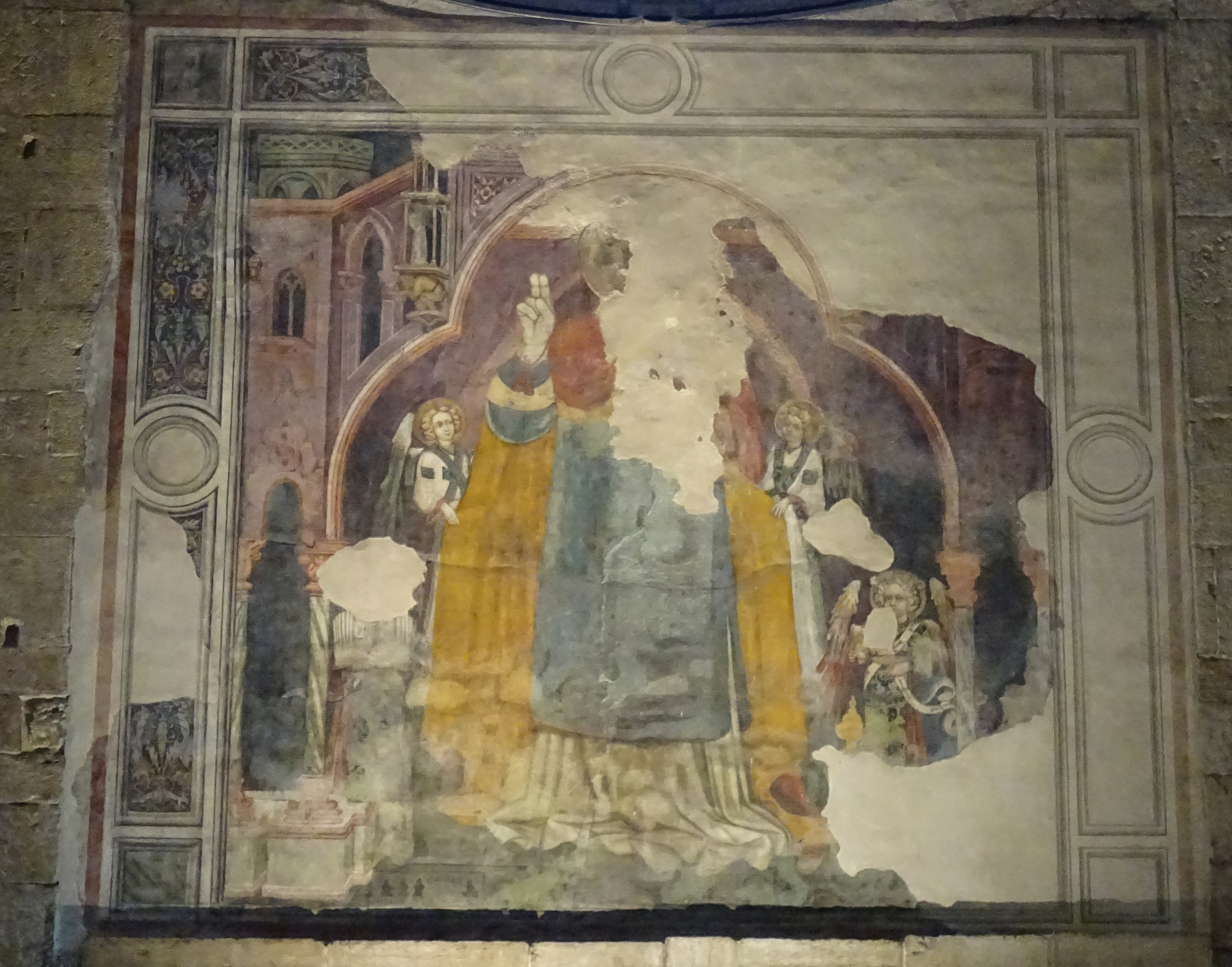
The fresco of Saint Vigilius in Glory on the counterfacade.

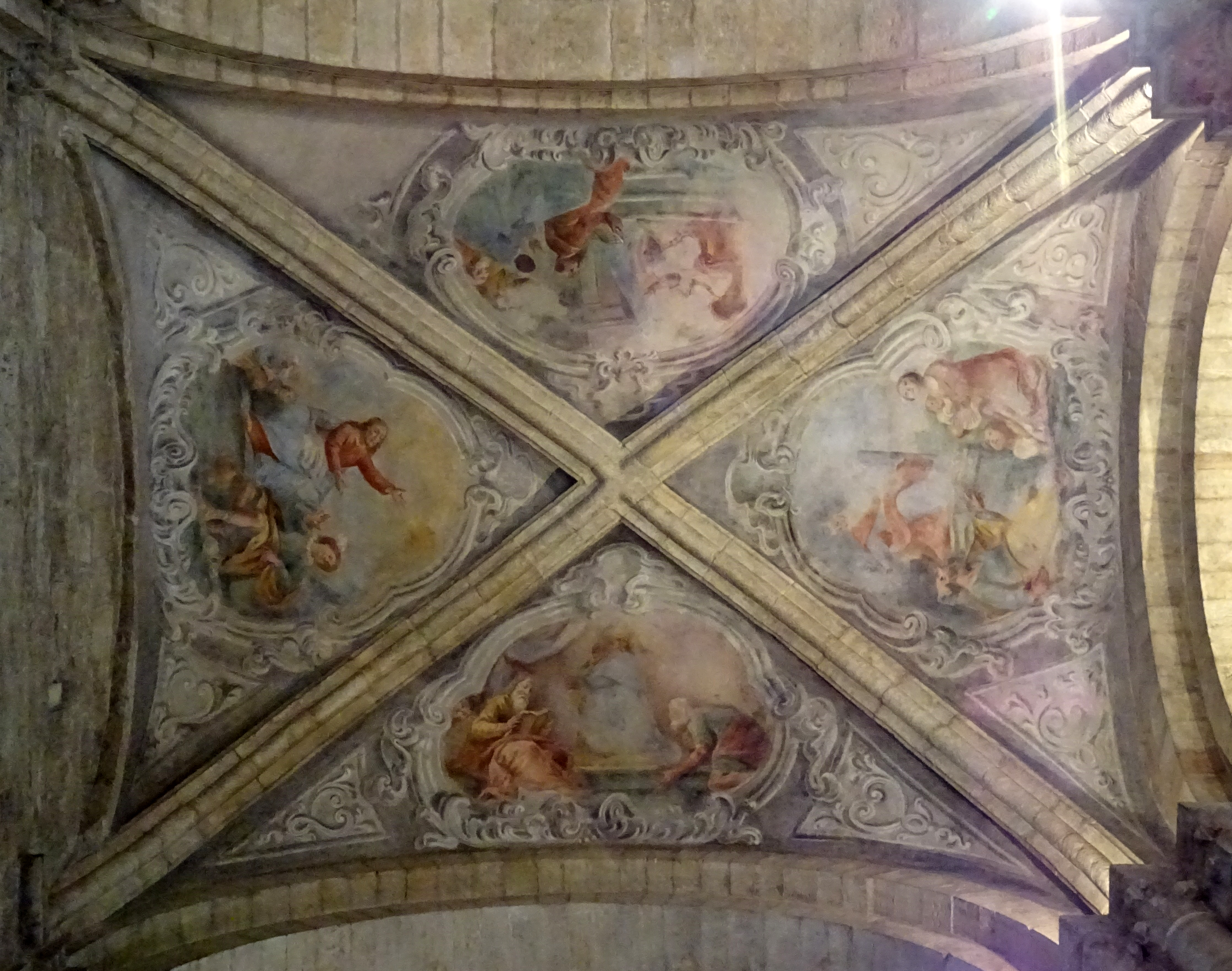
Some of the Baroque frescoes by Giuseppe Antonio Caccioli on the vaults of the left nave.

The other walls of the church are less richly decorated. On the left wall of the choir is a 15th-century Giottesque fragment depicting the Madonna and Child. Another Giottesque fresco, possibly by a Paduan artist from around 1320, is located at the end of the left nave: only part of it was visible, hidden behind Bernardo Clesio’s cenotaph, but after the tomb’s relocation and the 2022 restoration, the entire Madonna enthroned with the Child emerged (except for the upper right corner, which is lost), along with the full figure of another saint on the left.

On the counterfacade, a heavily damaged image in a Nordic style, created in the early 15th century under the episcopate of George of Liechtenstein, depicts a bishop in glory, likely Saint Vigilius, surrounded by four angels, with a detailed architectural church section in the background.

With the start of the 15th century, “the great season of Gothic mural painting in Trento’s cathedral came to a close”. Perhaps during the century, the vaults were painted for the first time with a starry sky, but aside from this, no new frescoes were added until the 18th century, when a major Baroque decorative campaign began to fulfill the vow made during the siege of 1703. The Parisian Louis Dorigny worked on the presbytery and the central nave’s vault (with images of Saint Vigilius’s life and diocesan saints), the Bolognese Giuseppe Antonio Caccioli on the lateral naves’ vaults (with stories from the Old and New Testaments), and the Trentine Kaspar Anton von Baroni-Cavalcabo on the dome. Completed by the mid-18th century, these frescoes were almost entirely destroyed during the late 19th-century Baroque purge, when the cathedral was restored to its “Romanesque purity”. Nicolò Rasmo remarked with regret that “[the] decoration was not at all aggressive and even respected the cathedral’s architectural lines, enriching it with a coloristic element now missed. The destruction was not due to 'disturbing the harmony of austere Romanesque forms,' but rather because the fear of the Gothic style had given way to the fear of the Baroque style, causing the frescoes of Dorigny and Baroni to fall victim. [...] We must regret that at the time of demolition, no one in Trento bothered to preserve, at least in photographs or drawings, a record of what was lost forever”.

The starry sky, created by Giuseppe Lona, returned to the nave vaults, while Luigi Spreafico frescoed the choir, apse, and dome vaults, but these works were whitewashed in the 1960s. During restorations in the early 2010s, a Caccioli fresco emerged in a vault of the fourth southern bay, depicting Christ in the house of Martha and Mary. Others were recovered in the northern nave in 2017, covering the vaults of three bays entirely.

== Funerary monuments ==
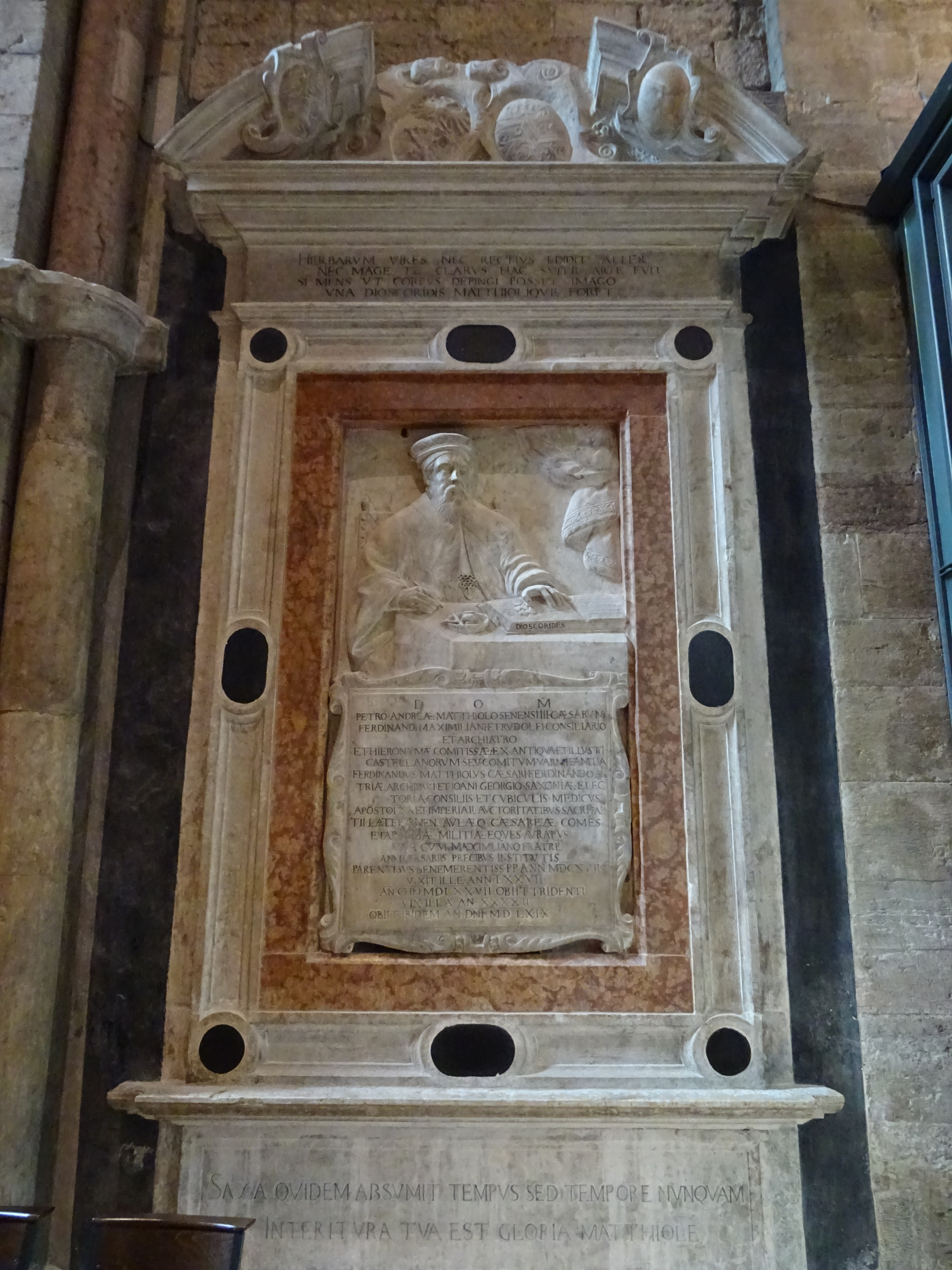
The funerary monument of Pietro Andrea Mattioli.

Historically, the cathedral of Trento, both during the time of the Paleochristian basilica and in the new Vangian construction, housed the burials of numerous figures linked to the church, primarily local bishops and canons, but also laypeople. Before the 20th-century floor refurbishment, about a hundred tombstones were embedded in the floor, with others affixed to the walls. In the cathedral’s current layout, about twenty funerary monuments remain, many originally paired with floor tombs, while others were lost or transferred elsewhere, such as to the archaeological area below, the Diocesan Museum, or the lapidarium of the Buonconsiglio Castle.

=== Naves ===
In the arcosolium at the southern corner of the counterfacade is the sarcophagus of the Trentine jurist Calepino Calepini (d. 1495), commissioned by his brother Donato in 1485. The slanted lid features the deceased sculpted on his deathbed, framed by palmettes and rinceaux. The base has a frontal frieze depicting a phoenix at the center (symbolizing resurrection) and two putti holding family crests (Calepini and possibly Bortolasi), framed by a dentil motif and two rectangular columns adorned with candelabra. Nearby, just to the left of the vestibule, is the funerary monument of the botanist Pietro Andrea Mattioli (1500-1577), court physician to Bernardo Clesio, erected by his sons forty years after his death and possibly crafted by Paolo Carneri. (Note: Paolo Carneri was a sculptor and painter. He was the son of Giovanni Domenico of the Carneri family and was born in 1560. He died on May 30, 1629. He had several children with his wife, Elisabetta Dell’Acqua, including Mattia Carneri. His works include the apse altarpiece for the Church of Santa Maria Maggiore, created between 1588 and 1590, which was replaced in the following century. See Cessi, Francesco. "Carneri". Dizionario Biografico degli Italiani - Treccani. Archived from the original on 12 October 2023.) Above a base with a brief Latin inscription stands a large slab with a double frame (red stone and white stone with touchstone inserts), featuring a bas-relief of the deceased and a large plaque with a funerary eulogy. The top includes a band with an inscription praising Mattioli’s profession and a broken pediment with the Mattioli and Varmo (his wife Girolama’s family, d. 1569) crests repeated twice. The bas-relief of Mattioli is highly detailed: the botanist, in a toga, sits at his study desk, writing his work on Dioscorides (with a fern drawing visible on the pages); around his neck is a medallion with the effigy of a bearded man, possibly a Habsburg.

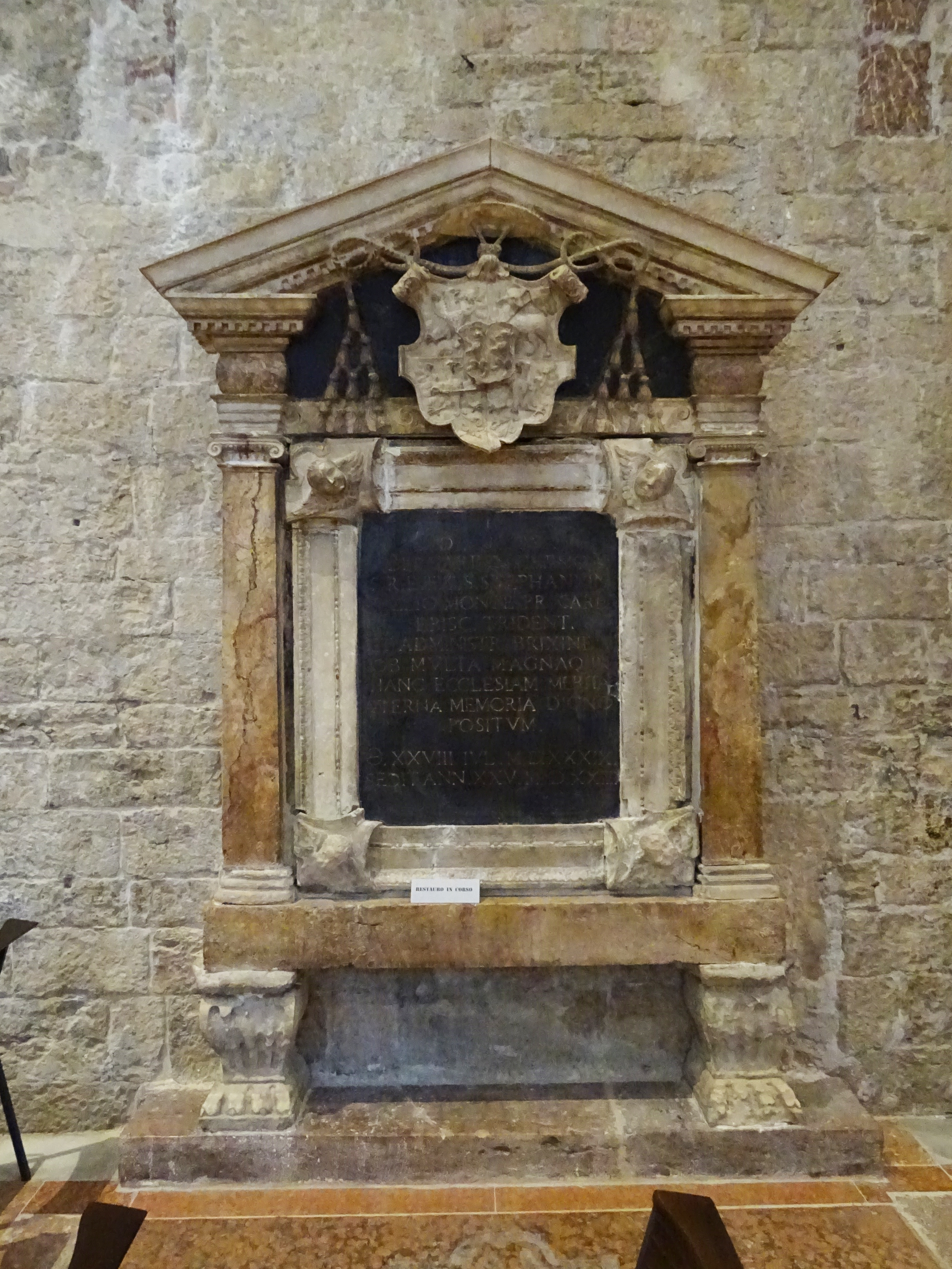
The modest tombstone of Bernardo Clesio.

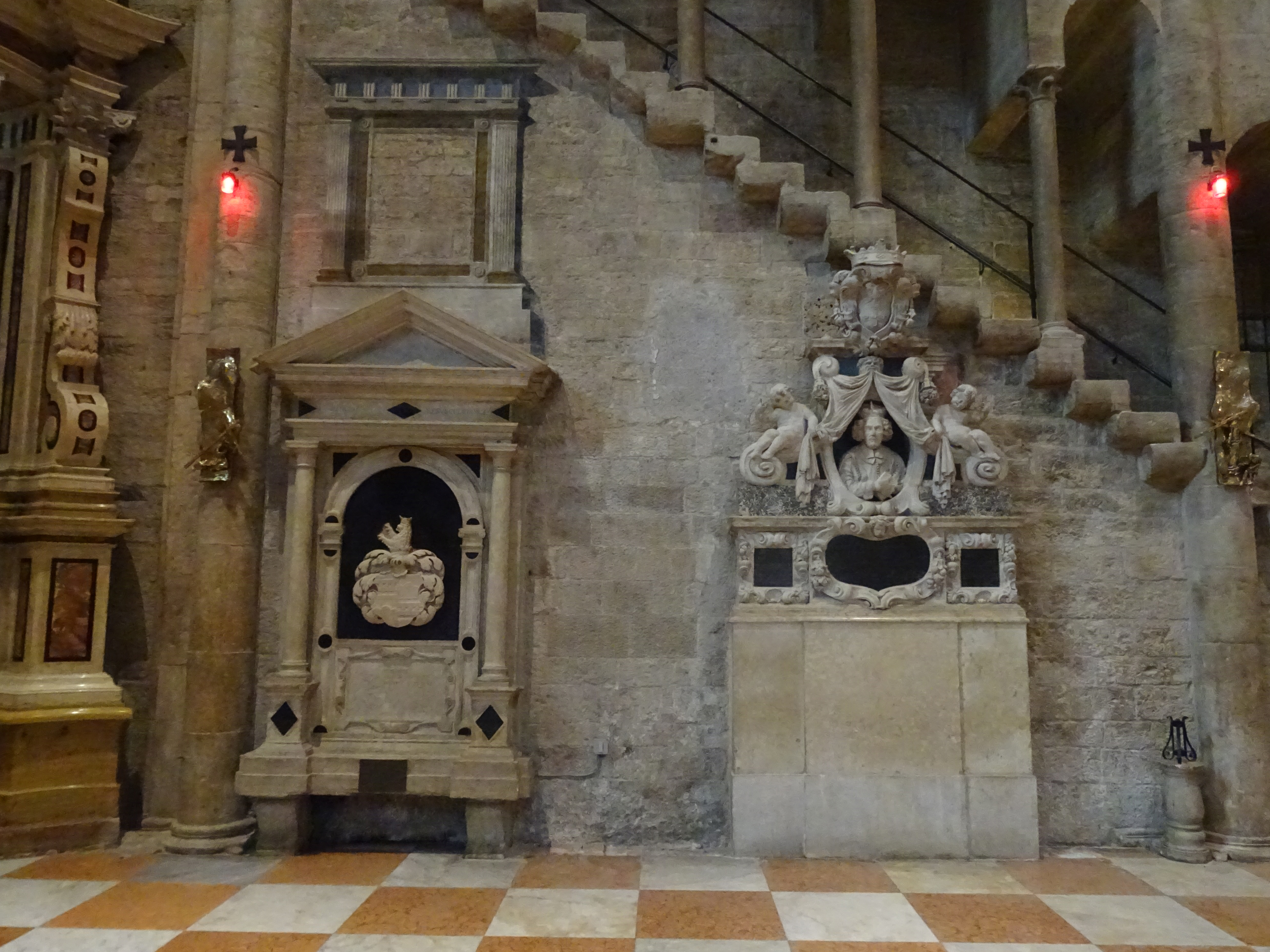
The tombs of Giulio Alessandrini and Liduino Piccolomini.

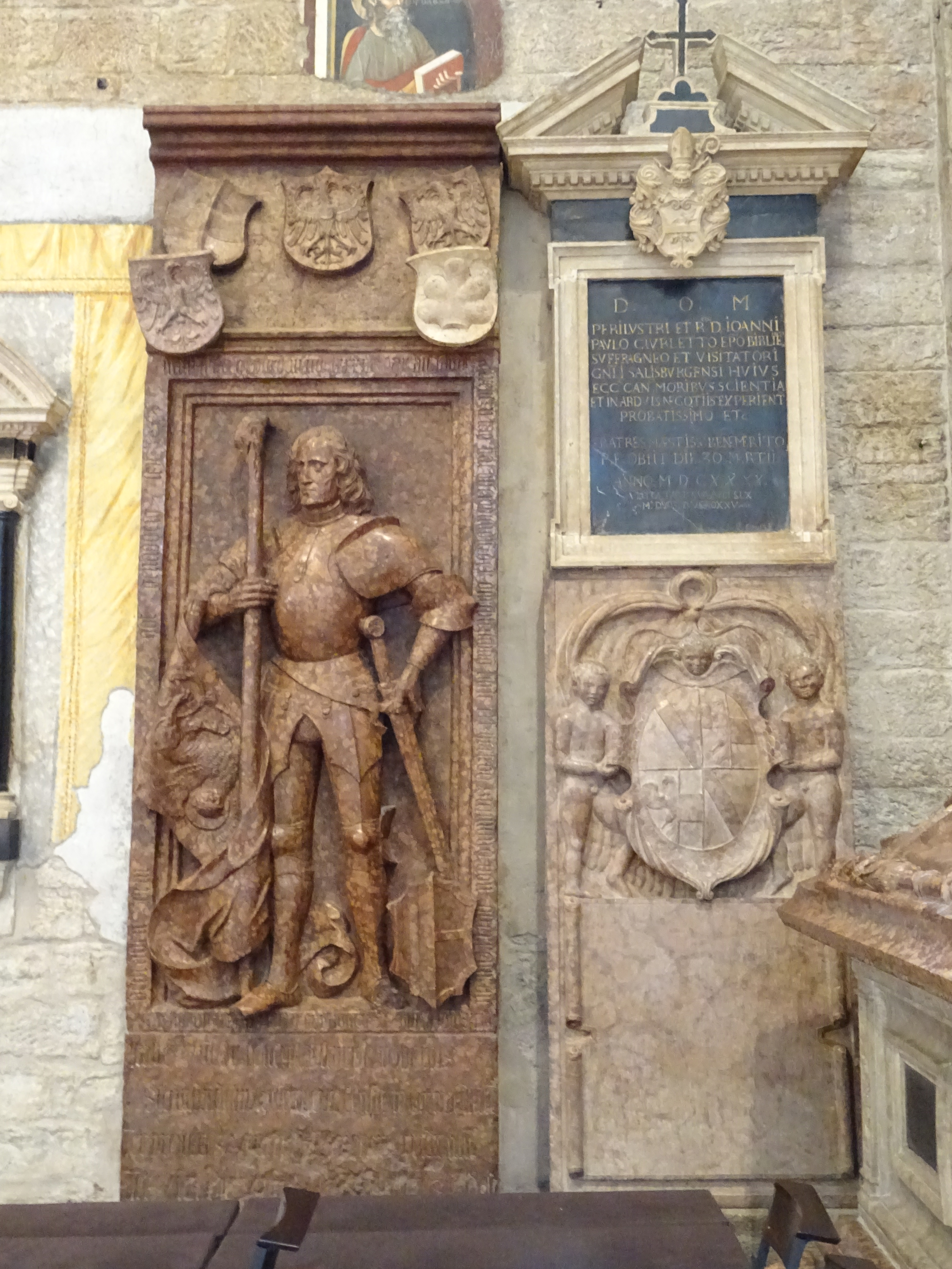
On the left, the tombstone of Roberto Sanseverino d'Aragona, on the right, the tombstones of Giovanni Paolo Ciurletti (above) and Simone Thun (below).

To the right of the vestibule stands the funerary monument of Count Leonardo Nogarola (d. 1543-1552), advisor to Ferdinand IV. Crafted in white stone, it is designed as an aedicule with two Ionic columns on plinths bearing skulls, topped by a disproportionate Doric architrave with a high molded cornice. Flanked by the columns, the central slab bears the Nogarola crest and a cartouche with an inscription, framed in pink stone with paterae and lozenges in touchstone.

In the left nave, before the altar, is one of the oldest surviving tombs in the cathedral, possibly from the early 13th century, adorned only with an unidentified crest that Rasmo linked to the Bortolasi family. Between the two altars in the left nave are the funerary monuments of Giulio Alessandrini (1506-1590, Habsburg court physician), Liduino Piccolomini (1611-1680, provost and canon), and Girolamo Roccabruna (1525-1599, archdeacon). The first is an aedicule in white and black stone with Doric columns and a triangular pediment, with the family crest at the center. The second follows the typical Venetian monument style of the period (a square topped by a triangle) and may be the work of Paul Strudel, who was working on the Chapel of the Crucifix at the time: at the center are three touchstone panels with inscriptions; above, two putti pull back a curtain, starting from two curls and a mascaron, revealing a niche with the deceased’s bust in canonical attire holding a breviary; at the top is the Piccolomini crest with fruiting branches and a comital crown. The third, in white stone, modeled on a Roman tombstone, consists of a marble altar with the inscription topped by a slab with the Roccabruna crest and an angel at the top.

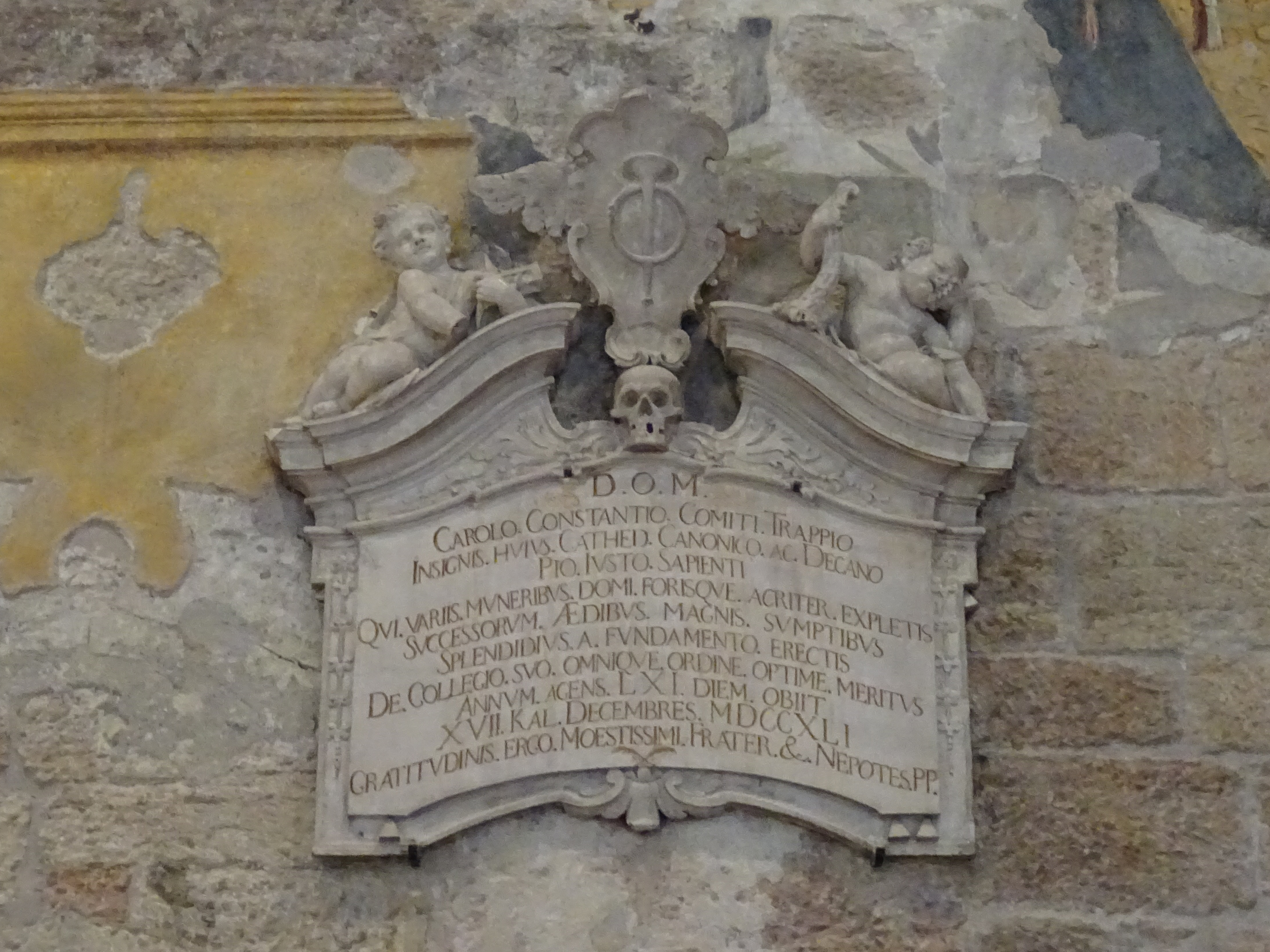
The funerary plaque of Carlo Costanzo Trapp in the right nave.

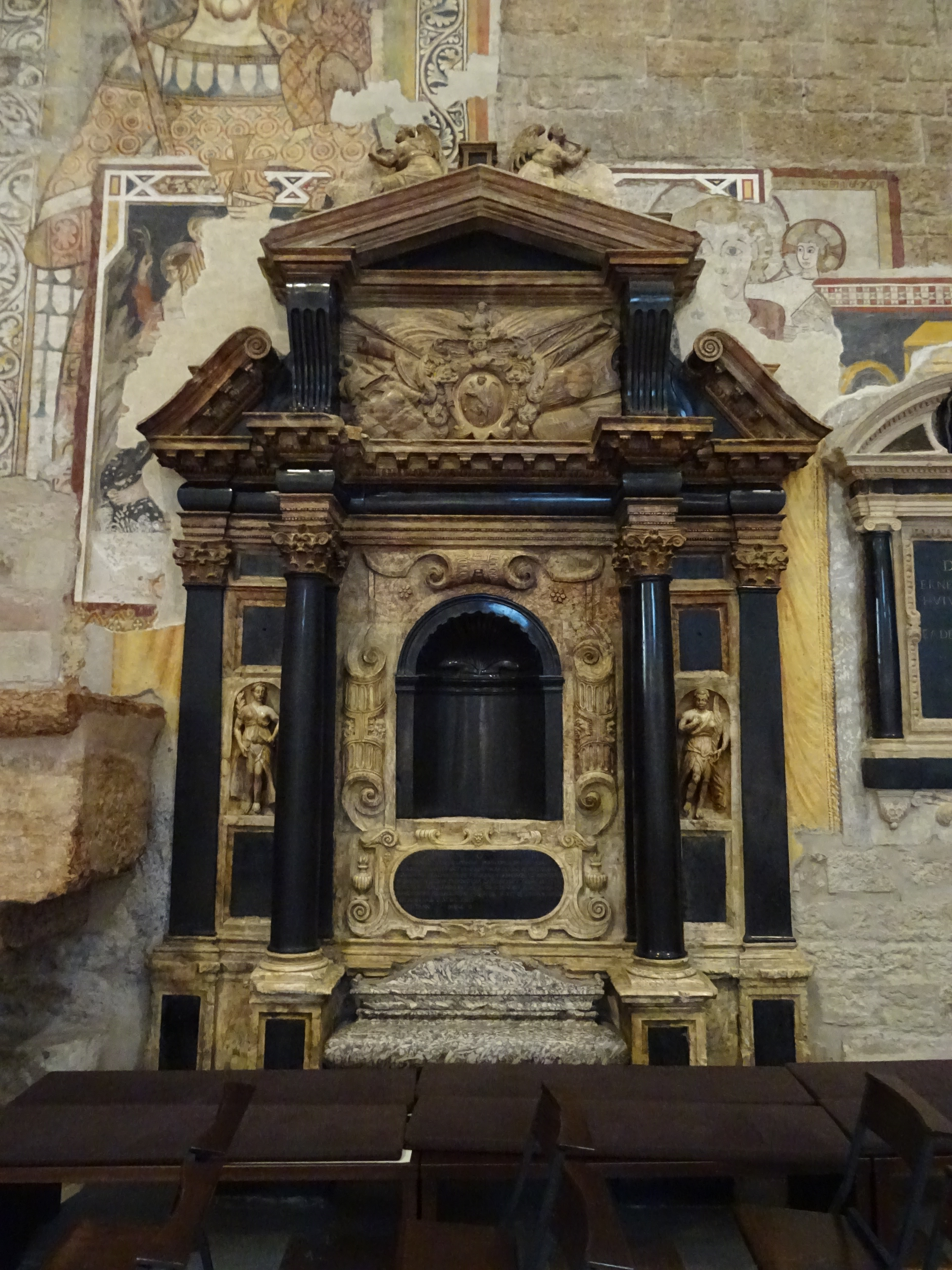
The funerary monument of Ludovico II Lodron.

In the last bay of the left nave is the funerary monument of Bernardo Clesio (1485-1539), created at least forty years after his death: resting on two animal feet, the base supports two Ionic pilasters, on which a pediment with the cardinal’s crest is mounted. Encased within and further framed by white stone with spindles and corner leaves is a touchstone slab bearing an incorrect death date (two days before the actual date of 1 August 1539). Inspired by Clesio’s tombstone but simpler is that of Canon Giovanni Battista Melchiorri (1564-1639), affixed in the third bay of the right nave: the touchstone inscription is framed in white stone, topped by an entablature with the family crest, and a triangular pediment with a cross at the apex. In the seventh bay of the right nave is the small tombstone of Canon and Dean Carlo Costanzo Trapp (1680-1741): a simple plaque with an epitaph, topped by a skull representing Vanitas, two putti with an hourglass and an inverted torch (symbolizing the passage of time and the end of life), and a cartouche with the serpent biting its tail (eternity), a trumpet, and wings (fame).

=== Transept ===
In the southern transept arm, several funerary monuments are found. The first, in the southeastern corner, is a rough ammonitic stone sarcophagus, resting on two brackets, which until 1977 contained the body of Blessed Adelpreto (later moved to a new tomb in the Paleochristian basilica). Killed in 1172 by Aldrighetto di Castelbarco and immediately acclaimed as a martyr, he was buried in the ancient basilica and transferred to this sarcophagus only in the 16th century. Next is the imposing cenotaph of Ludovico II Lodron, captain in the Holy League, commissioned by himself in 1600 for himself and his wife Susanna Beatrice, possibly crafted by Paolo Carneri. Designed like an altar and made of white and black marble, the main body is divided into three segments by two lateral pilasters and two more advanced inner columns, all resting on rectangular plinths with Corinthian capitals. The central segment houses a Castione marble urn at the base; above is an oval panel with the funerary inscription, framed with scrolls, flaming vases, and a leonine protome, and a niche with a conch (whose contents, if any, are unknown) framed by cartouches. The narrower lateral segments house two niches with statues, possibly personifications of Victory and Prudence. The upper part, resting on the columns’ entablature and a touchstone bearing, is a wide pediment with the Lodron family crest surrounded by warlike imagery. Further right is the tombstone of Ernesto Wolkenstein (1552-1616), dean of the cathedral from 1608: a simple white and black monument with a central inscription framed by egg-and-dart and cartouche motifs, flanked by Ionic columns; at the base is an angel’s face with vegetal friezes, and at the top, a broken pediment with a conch containing a small bust of the deceased.

Next is the tombstone of Roberto Sanseverino d'Aragona, a condottiero in Venetian service who fought against Sigismund of Austria’s troops and drowned in the Adige during the Battle of Calliano of 1487. His body, recovered by the Trentine opponents, was triumphantly brought to Trento and buried with pomp in a tomb topped by an equestrian statue wearing his armor (now in Vienna). In 1493, his remains were transferred to a sarcophagus commissioned and paid for by Emperor Maximilian, but only five years later, they were returned to his sons and buried in the Church of San Francesco Grande in Milan. Nothing remains of the first tomb, while the second sarcophagus’s lid and two ends in red ammonitic stone survive, now arranged vertically with the lid in the center. Crafted by Lucas Maurus of Kempten, the lid depicts the deceased at full scale in armor, with his personal crest at the bottom right: Sanseverino stands with his left hand on his sword and the right holding a staff with the Venetian banner. Despite the proud pose, the depiction subtly mocks the defeated enemy, exalting his victors: the staff’s top is broken, letting the flag droop to the ground, with the Lion of Saint Mark ignominiously upside down. The lid’s frame bears an elegant German inscription in Gothic script, and here too, the names of the Venetians (Venediger) and the deceased (senior Robert) fall under his feet, with “Robert” almost covered by them. Further inscriptions run on the foot slab, while the head slab honors the victors, bearing five crests of Austria, Tyrol, Trentino, the Prince-Bishopric of Trent, and Prince-Bishop Udalrico Frundsberg.

To the right of Sanseverino’s tombstone are two others, one above the other: the lower one is for Count Simone Thun (d. 1584), dean of the cathedral and canon of Salzburg, containing only the Thun crest held by two putti and a rectangular cartouche now without an inscription; the upper one is for Canon Giovanni Paolo Ciurletti (1584-1640), and like Melchiorri’s tombstone (likely by the same artist), it echoes Clesio’s form. The touchstone epitaph is framed by a white molded band, with a broken pediment containing a black-and-white cross and the crest on the intermediate band.

Against the western wall of the southern transept is the only intact episcopal tomb, the sarcophagus of Prince-Bishop Udalrico Lichtenstein (d. 1505). Two Gothic lions support a molded red ammonitic stone frame, on which rests a Renaissance-style light stone ark with central touchstone elements, corner columns with vegetal scrolls, and a top border with a twisted motif. The right face bears a Latin inscription; the slanted tombstone depicts the bishop framed in an arch, topped by two cusped aedicules with half-busts of Saints Vigilius and Ulrich, while below are the crests of the Prince-Bishopric and the Lichtenstein family. On the wall beside the sarcophagus is the tombstone of Giulia Crotta, who died during the plague epidemic of 1574-1575, transferred here from the cemetery and inspired by Roman funerary steles: within a round arch are the busts of the woman and, in the background, her still-living husband Giovanni Battista a Coredo, with a cherub’s head atop a heavily deteriorated inscribed cartouche.

In the northern transept arm, suspended on two brackets among the frescoes, is a pink marble ark without seals, dating to the early 13th century: it likely held the remains of Prince-Bishop Bartolomeo II Querini (d. 1307) or his successor Heinrich III. von Metz (d. 1336), later transferred to the Paleochristian basilica. The sarcophagus is made of local red stone, bordered at the top with acanthus leaves and poppy capsules symbolizing Hypnos, and angled by twisted columns with Corinthian capitals, with underlying dentil friezes. In the tomb beneath the Madonna of the Drowned statue rest the remains of Blessed Bishop Johann Nepomuk von Tschiderer zu Gleifheim (1777-1860).

== Chapel of the Crucifix ==
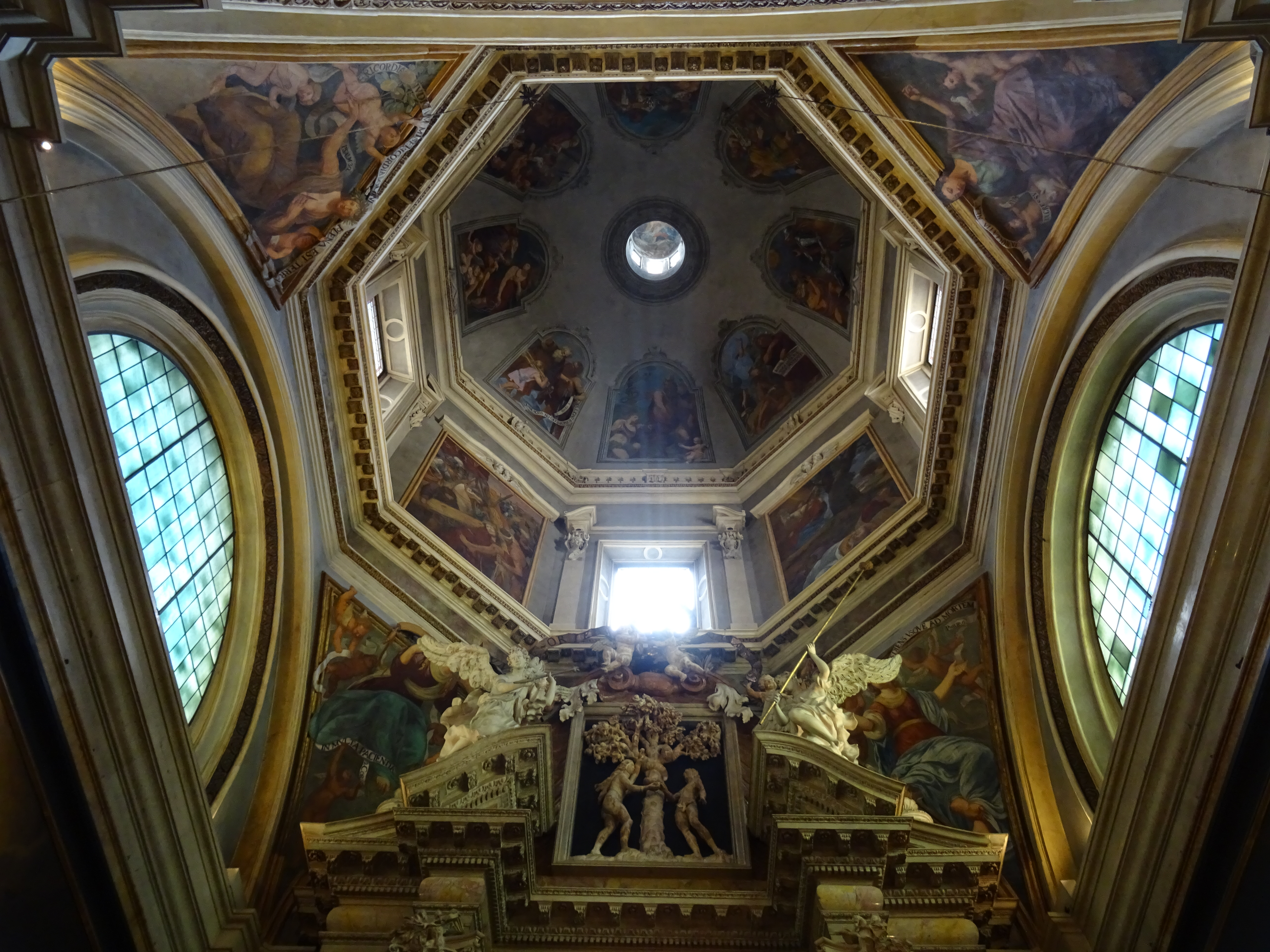
The dome of the Chapel of the Crucifix.

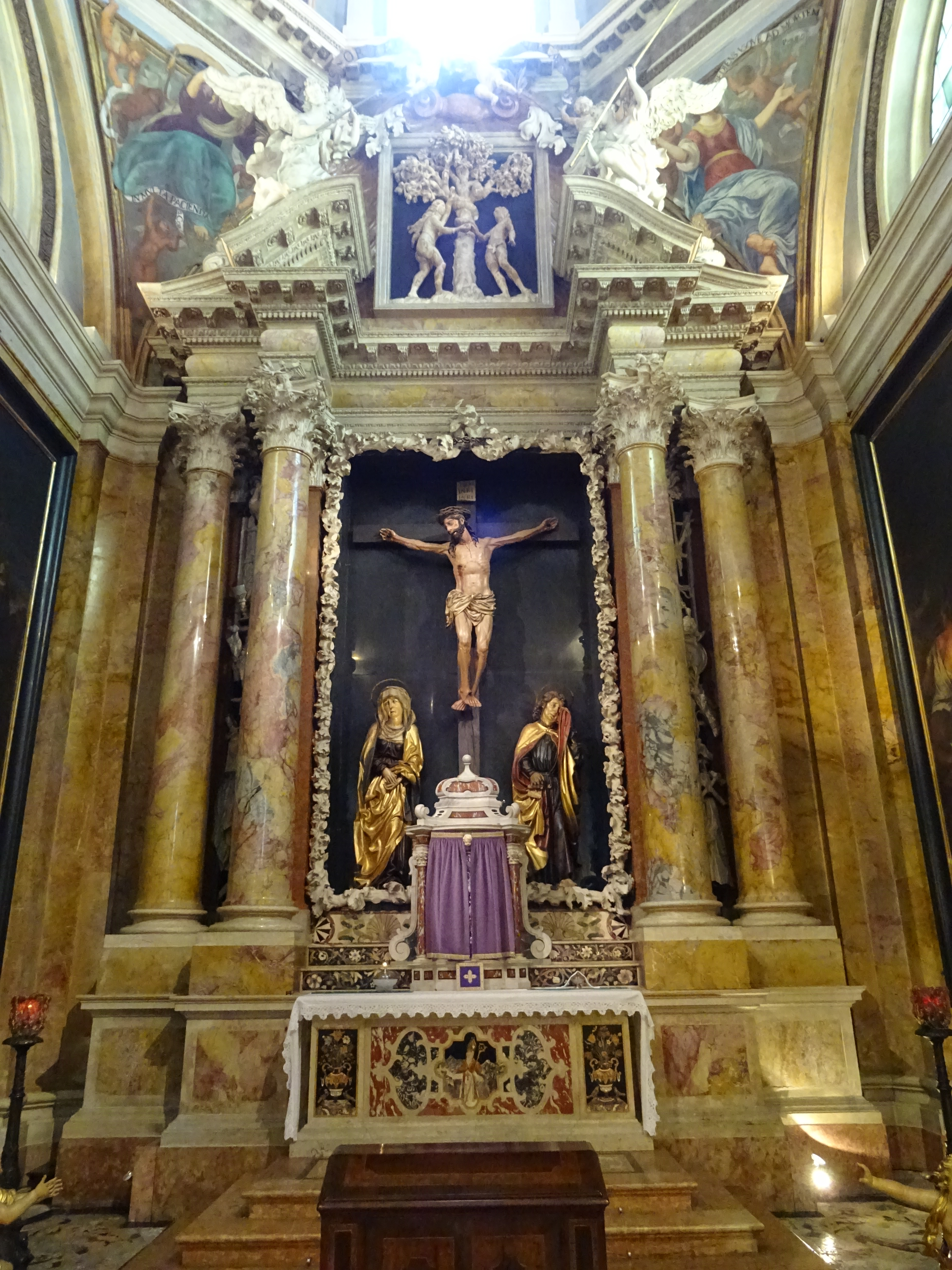
The altar of the Chapel of the Crucifix.

The Chapel of the Crucifix, also known as the Alberti Chapel, is the cathedral’s only lateral chapel, opening in the sixth bay of the right nave. Added in 1682 by the will of Prince-Bishop Francesco Alberti Poja, who entrusted its design and decoration to the priest-artist Giuseppe Alberti, its main purpose was to house the wooden Crucifixion group, but it was also intended as the bishop’s funerary chapel. Costing over one hundred thousand thalers, the structure involved numerous artists and was undoubtedly one of the most remarkable Baroque masterpieces of the entire Prince-Bishopric. Alberti Poja's ambition to have himself and his family celebrated in the structure drew resentment from his successors.

The iconography revolves around the theme of redemption: the central focus is the Baroque altar, with elements attributed to various artists. The architectural elements and the central altar frontal decoration with Saint Vigilius are by the Castione sculptors Benedetti, who also created the chapel’s flooring, while the lateral panels of the frontal with floral vases are by Antonio Corbarelli. The sculptural elements (notably the angels on the pediment and the column capitals) are by Paul Strudel, except for the pediment’s marble sculpture by Francesco Barbacovi, depicting Adam and Eve heeding the devil in serpent form, taking the fruit from the Tree of the Knowledge of Good and Evil. Between the lateral columns run two bands with the symbols of the Arma Christi, crafted in stucco by Gerolamo Aliprandi, who also created all other stuccoes in the chapel. Finally, in the altarpiece is the 16th-century wooden Crucifixion group with Our Lady of Sorrows and Saint John, attributed to Sixtus Frey. (Note: Sixtus Frey, also known as Sisto Frei, was a sculptor from Nuremberg about whom virtually nothing is known. The only work certainly attributed to him is the wooden equestrian statue of Bartolomeo Colleoni in the Colleoni Chapel in Bergamo. See "Sixtus Frei (Frey)". Virtual museum of Nuremberg art. Archived from the original on 24 April 2023.) Previously housed in the Holy Cross altar at the head of the main nave, it was strongly associated with the Council of Trent.

The figurative work continues in the vault frescoes, all by Alberti: in the pendentives are the four virtues of Christ: Patience, Obedience, Mercy, and Innocence; in the drum, five scenes of the Passion: Prayer in the Garden, Arrest of Jesus, Flagellation, Crowning with Thorns, and Ascent to Calvary; in the dome’s segments, eight Old Testament episodes: Adam and Eve expelled from Paradise, Jacob Wrestling with the Angel, Sol et luna obtenebrati sunt, Daniel in the Lions’ Den, Job Afflicted, Samson Mocked, Humanity Imprisoned Awaiting Redemption by Christ, and the Sacrifice of Isaac; finally, in the lantern, the image of God the Father.

On the chapel’s side walls hang two large paintings by Johann Carl Loth and his workshop, depicting the Adoration of the Shepherds and the Resurrection of Jesus. Originally, these canvases were partially covered by two oval marble relief medallions by Paul Strudel, fixed at the bottom center, one showing the ecstasy of Saint Francis, the other Bishop Alberti Poja presented to the Crucifix by Saint Vigilius. These were removed during a 19th-century restoration, and Franz Xaver Fischer was hired to paint additional elements to fill the void; the oval with the bishop was relocated above the chapel’s entrance arch, while the Saint Francis sculpture was transferred to the Capuchin Convent. During the same restoration, the chapel suffered its greatest loss: the removal of nearly all of Aliprandi’s lavish stucco decorations, partly due to deterioration and difficulties with the restoration, but also to tone down the Baroque elements deemed undesirable in the late 19th century.

The entrance, closed by a fine wrought iron gate with the Alberti Poja crest, is flanked by two statues of Veronica and Magdalene, also by Paul Strudel, which until the 19th century stood beside the chapel’s altar.

== Sacristies ==
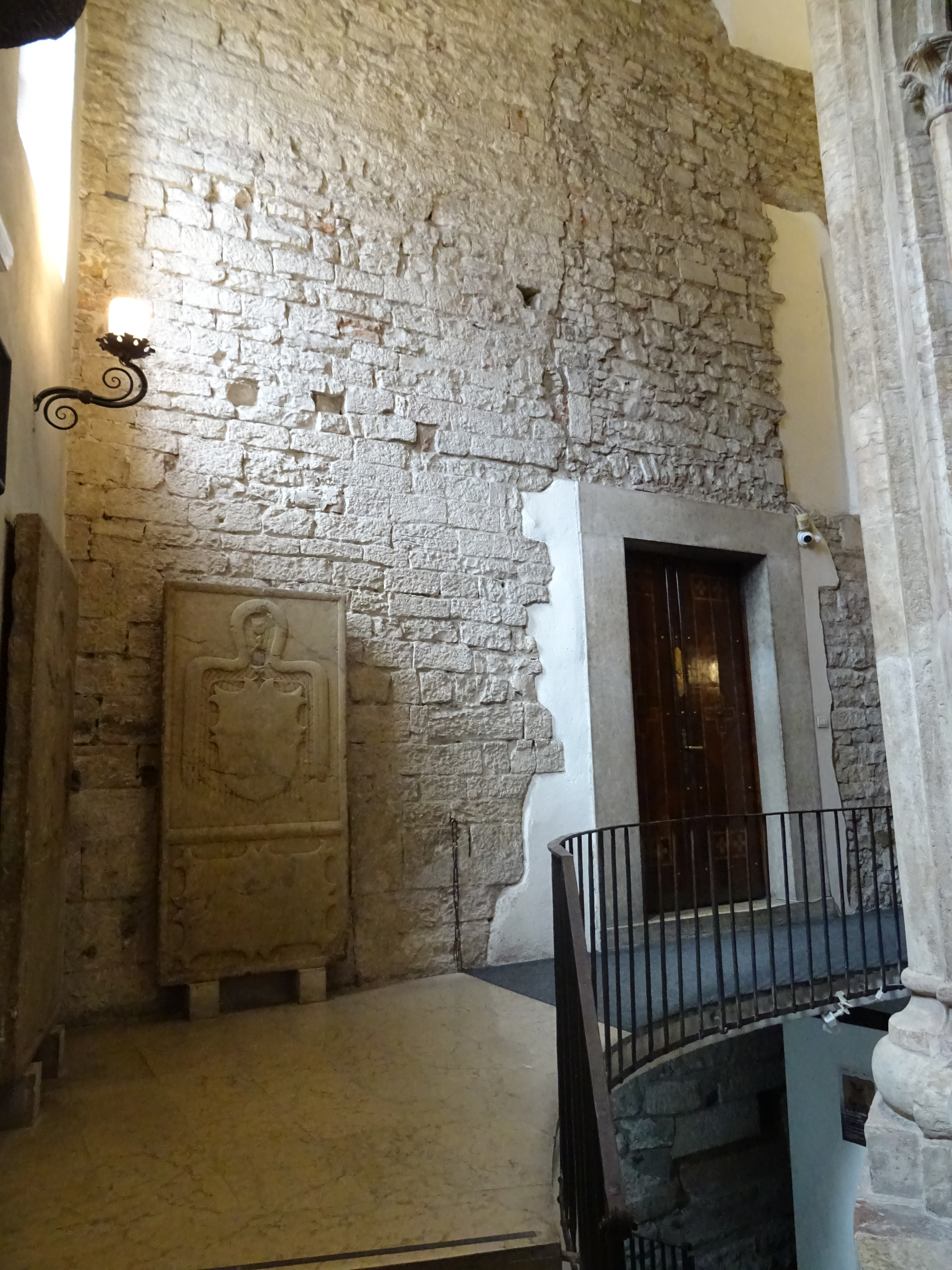
The access portal to the sacristy of relics, in the antechamber behind the northern transept arm; on the right, part of the northern apsidal chapel is visible.

Behind the northeastern side of the cathedral are two sacristies: the sacristy of relics (the southernmost, under the Castelletto of the Palazzo Pretorio) and the canons’ sacristy (immediately to the north). Through a door on the north wall of the choir or a staircase to the left of the northern apsidal chapel, one reaches the passage between the cathedral and the Palazzo Pretorio, enclosed by a 15th-century wall partition. From there, access is gained to the sacristy of relics, which in turn leads to the canons’ sacristy.

The sacristy of relics is paved with stone; in addition to modern cabinets, it houses the relic cabinet in the apse, with doors painted to mimic their contents, created around 1741. The most precious relics are preserved in the Diocesan Museum. The canons’ sacristy is paved with wood and furnished with cabinets from 1745–48, crowned with the heraldic insignia of the seventeen canons who commissioned them. It also holds six paintings by an anonymous 18th-century Veronese artist, depicting stories and miracles of Saint Anthony of Padua, and a fresco detached from the northern transept’s apsidal chapel.

As mentioned, the two sacristies are not within the cathedral but are housed in the Palazzo Pretorio, the former episcopal residence whose original core, dating to the 9th-10th centuries, is the so-called “Castelletto,” the southernmost part. In 1070, two superimposed chapels are documented at the Castelletto’s base, where the sacristy of relics now stands: above was the palatine chapel, dedicated to Saint Blaise, and below another dedicated to Saint John the Baptist. The Vangian reconstruction of the cathedral introduced a sacrestia parva in the apsidal semicircle, to which a sacrestia nova or magna was added in the first half of the 14th century, built between the Castelletto’s southern side and the cathedral’s apse, also containing the chapter archive and a hanging latrine. In 1579, Ludovico Madruzzo decided to use the Saint Blaise chapel as a sacristy: by then, it was already used for the Chapter’s functions, which were moved to the sacrestia magna.

With the 1739 presbytery renovations, both the sacrestia parva and sacrestia magna were decommissioned (the latter entirely demolished). The canons’ sacristy was relocated to the Castelletto room adjacent to the Saint Blaise chapel, and the palace’s two chapels were reorganized into three new spaces: the sacristy of the presbytery occupied the upper part of the Saint John chapel and the lower part of the Saint Blaise chapel, leaving out the base of the former (turned into a low vaulted storage) and the upper part of the latter (converted into another room).

== See also ==
- Archdiocese of Trento
- Prince-Bishopric of Trent
- Vigilius of Trent

== Bibliography ==
- Castelnuovo, Enrico; Passamani, Bruno; Peroni, Adriano; Rogger, Iginio; Seebach, Gerhard (1992). Il duomo di Trento [The Cathedral of Trento]. Vol. 1. Temi. ISBN 88-85114-15-6.
- Castelnuovo, Enrico; Bacchi, Andrea; Bellabarba, Marco; Castri, Serenella; Collareta, Marco; Chini, Ezio; Koeppe, Wolfram; Lupo, Michelangelo; Mich, Elvio (1993). Il duomo di Trento [The Cathedral of Trento]. Vol. 2. Temi. ISBN 88-85114-18-0.
- Chini, Ezio; Ferrari, Salvatore; Toffolon, Beppo, eds. (2022). Trento città dipinta [Trento, Painted City]. Antiga Edizione. ISBN 978-88-8435-308-5.
- De Carli, Giulio (1965). La Cattedrale di San Vigilio [The Cathedral of Saint Vigilius]. Trento: Temi. SBL0285874.
- Maule, Lodovico; Moser, Chiara, eds. (2020). Squillate, campane! Le campane della Cattedrale di san Vigilio a Trento nel centenario della loro rifusione. 1920-2020 [Ring, Bells! The Bells of Saint Vigilius Cathedral in Trento on the Centenary of Their Recasting. 1920-2020]. Trento: Vita Trentina. ISBN 978-88-95060-68-2.
- Maule, Lodovico; Anderle, Michele, eds. (2022). Le sacrestie. Dalla Cappella palatina alle sacrestie della Cattedrale [The Sacristies. From the Palatine Chapel to the Sacristies of the Cathedral]. Trento: Vita Trentina. ISBN 978-88-95060-75-0.
- Obermair, Hannes; Schedl, Michaela (2018). "Art in the Double Periphery. Commissions ordered by the Bishops Johannes Hinderbach and Ulrich von Liechtenstein in Early Modern Trento" (PDF). Concilium Medii Aevi. 21 (21). Göttingen: Duehrkohp & Radicke: 53–73. doi:10.11588/cma.2018.0.77650. ISSN 1437-904X.
- Pacher, Carlo (1957). La cattedrale di Trento [The Cathedral of Trento]. Trento: Temi. IEI0008197.
- Pancheri, Roberto (2013). "Sono del bolognese Caccioli gli affreschi parzialmente rimessi in luce nella cattedrale" [The Frescoes Partially Uncovered in the Cathedral Are by the Bolognese Caccioli]. Strenna Trentina.
- Rogger, Iginio (2004). Il Duomo di Trento [The Cathedral of Trento]. Museo Diocesano Tridentino. (text also published online, in "La lunga storia della cattedrale di Trento" [The Long History of Trento Cathedral]. Cattedrale San Vigilio.)
- Svaizer, Antonio; Vareschi, Severino (1992). Una cattedrale per la diocesi: il duomo di Trento [A Cathedral for the Diocese: The Cathedral of Trento]. Trento: Provincia autonoma di Trento - Iprase del Trentino.
- Tomezzoli, Andrea; Ton, Denis, eds. (2022). I colori della Serenissima: pittura veneta del Settecento in Trentino [The Colors of the Serenissima: Venetian Painting of the 18th Century in Trentino]. Castello del Buonconsiglio, Monumenti e collezioni provinciali. ISBN 979-12-80581-19-8.
