= Paolo Oss Mazzurana =

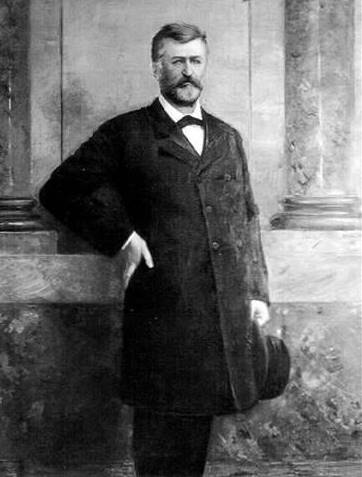
Paolo Oss Mazzurana, in a painting by Ettore Ximenes (1856)

Paolo Oss Mazzurana (1833–1895) was an Austrian-Hungarian statesman, and most importantly the most famous mayor of his native city, Trento. His tenure was characterized by progressive economic policies that impacted Trento's commercial sector and eventually led to its independence as a state.

== History ==
Mazzurana is considered as the symbol of an age of great progress from the civil and social point of view and from a more strictly economic one of the city and of the entire Trentino. Under his far-sighted guidance Trento was given a modern urbanistic order, became industrialized and realized meaningful cultural and social increase. Thanks to his charisma he realized a series of economic reforms in favour of the population, adopting a political "liberal" address and establishing a creative relationship with Trento, an Italian city in the Habsburg empire. Insofar as the action of Paolo Oss Mazzurana during the four podestarili periods comprised between 1872 and his death appears always supported from sturdy cultural and national ideals but also from solid economic bases, understandings to giving force to the demands for autonomy of the Trentino from the German Tyrol. The introduction of the electric power in the houses of Trento, the "democratic light", as he had defined, created workplaces and promoted the well-being of the popular classes, giving impulse to industrialization. At the same time Mazzurana promoted a series of studies in order to create an electrical tramway net, in order to permit workers to reach Trento from the surrounding area. Amongst the most important realizations are the new urban planning of the city, the new School Palace (currently School of Sociology), the renovation of the area of the railway station, the Kindergarten, and the new quarters opened for the labourers.

During the period of "economic renaissance" brought by Oss Mazzurana, Trento and Trentino can be aligned to the rest of Europe in the social and economic life, as well as in the cultural level.
