= Mattarello =

Coordinates: 46°00′N 11°07′E

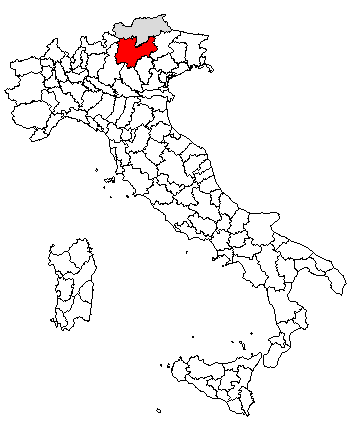
Location of Trentino

Mattarello is a small town in Trentino, Italy. It has been subsumed into a frazione of the comune of Trento, having previously been an independent comune. It has a population of 6,226.

Mattarello is the site of the interdepartmental research centre CIBIO(Centre for Integrative Biology, part of the University of Trento), which applies cross-disciplinary approaches to the study of basic biological processes and their derangement in disease.

Trento airport is near the town, and adjacent the airport is the Museo dell'Aeronautica Gianni Caproni (Gianni Caproni Museum of Aeronautics), an aeronautical museum named in honour of engineer, aircraft designer and businessman Gianni Caproni, whose company made the first aircraft constructed in Italy.

Mattarello is also the Italian word for rolling pin.
