= Trento =

Comune in Trentino-Alto Adige/Südtirol, Italy

Trento Trent (Ladin) Trient (German)
- Comune
- Comune di Trento
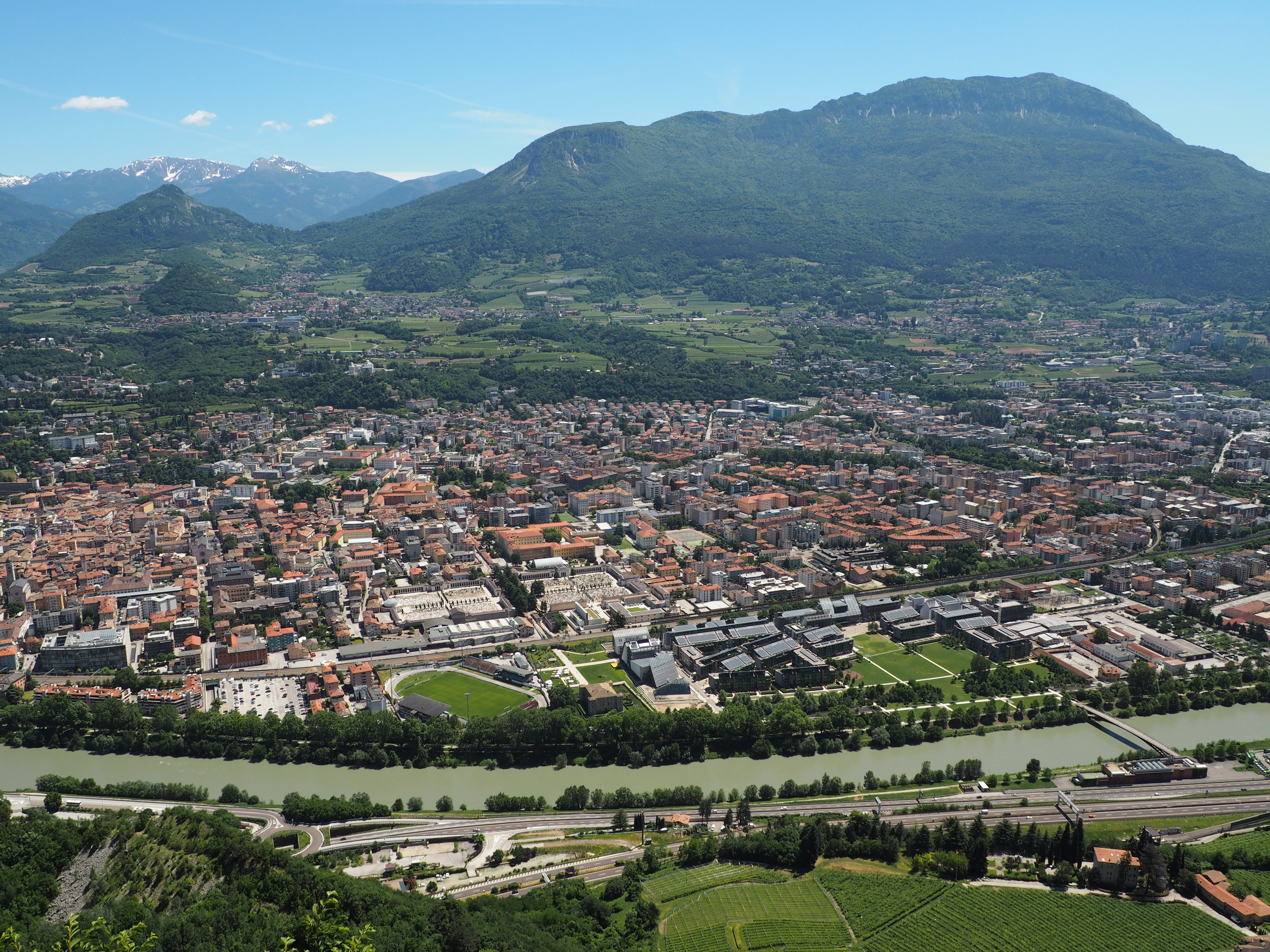
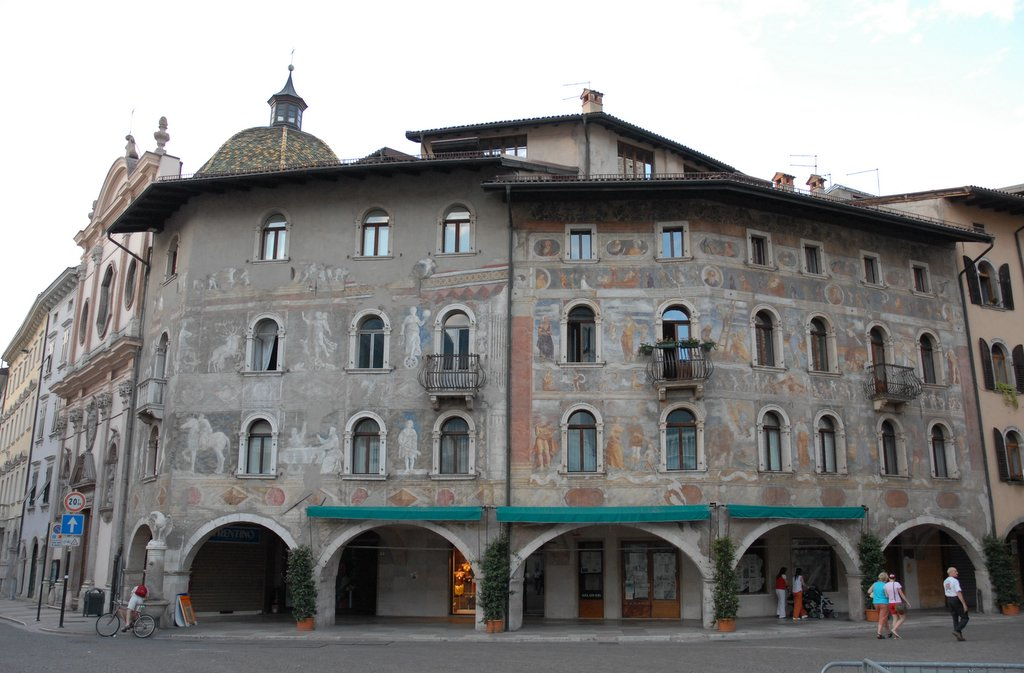
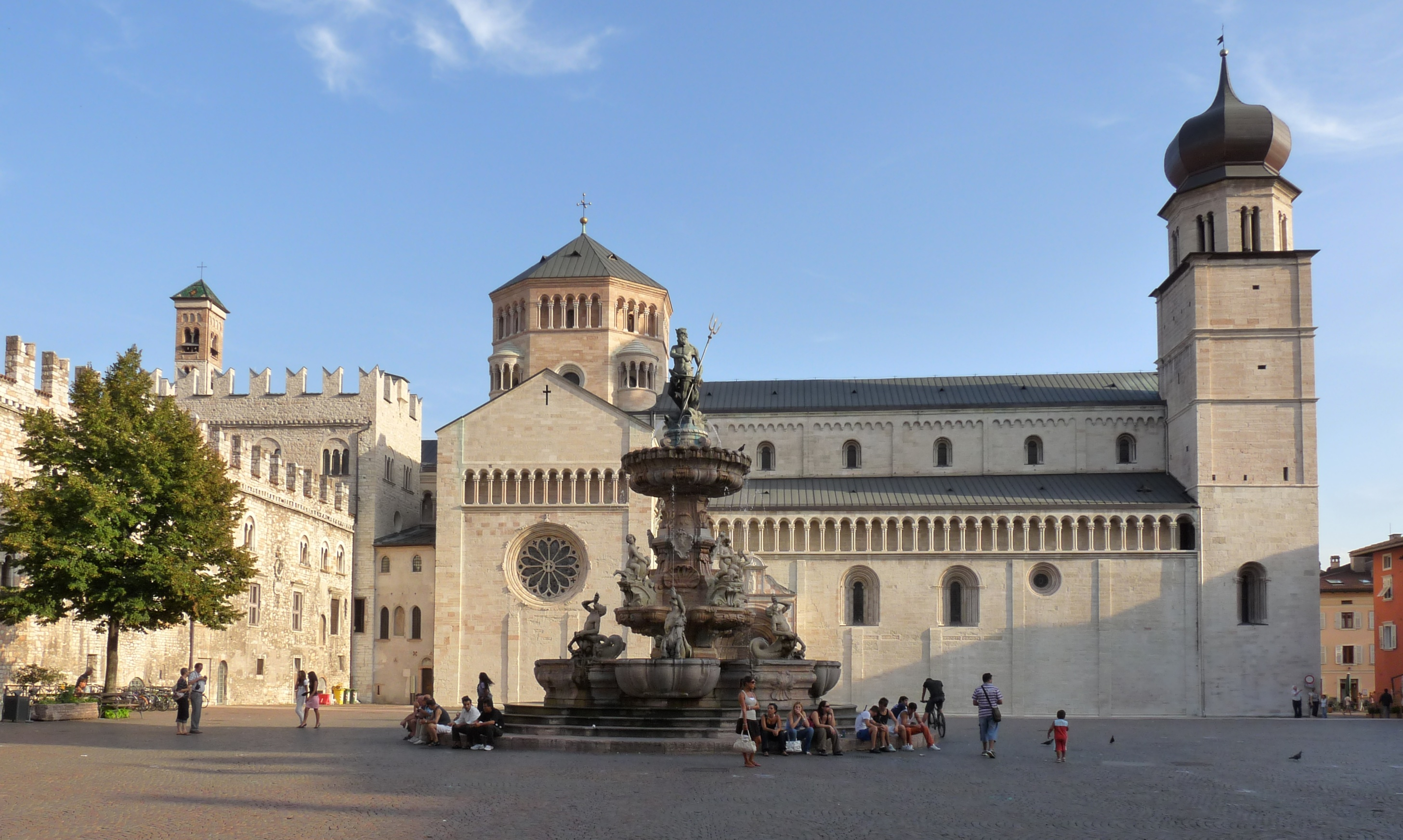
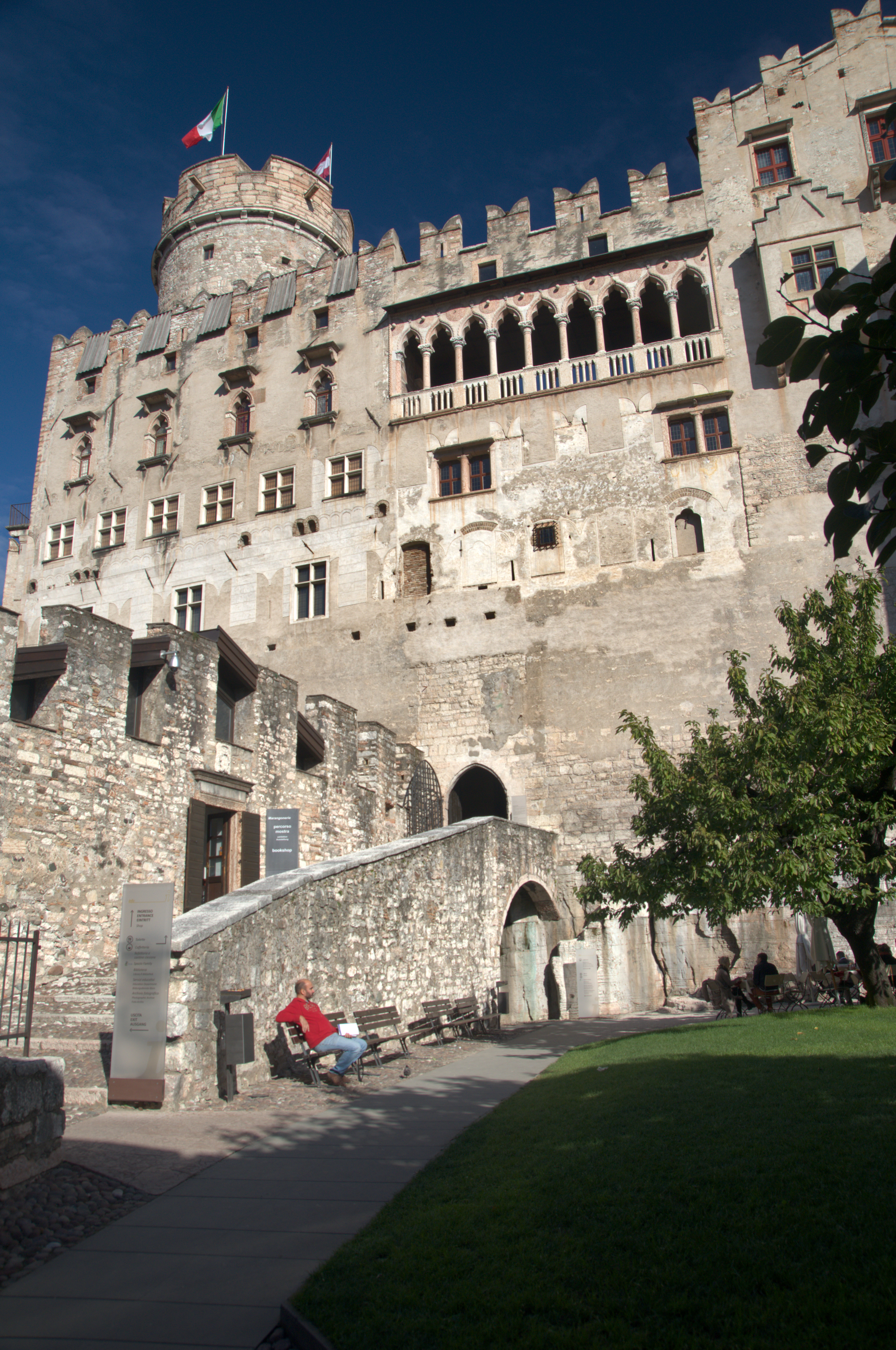
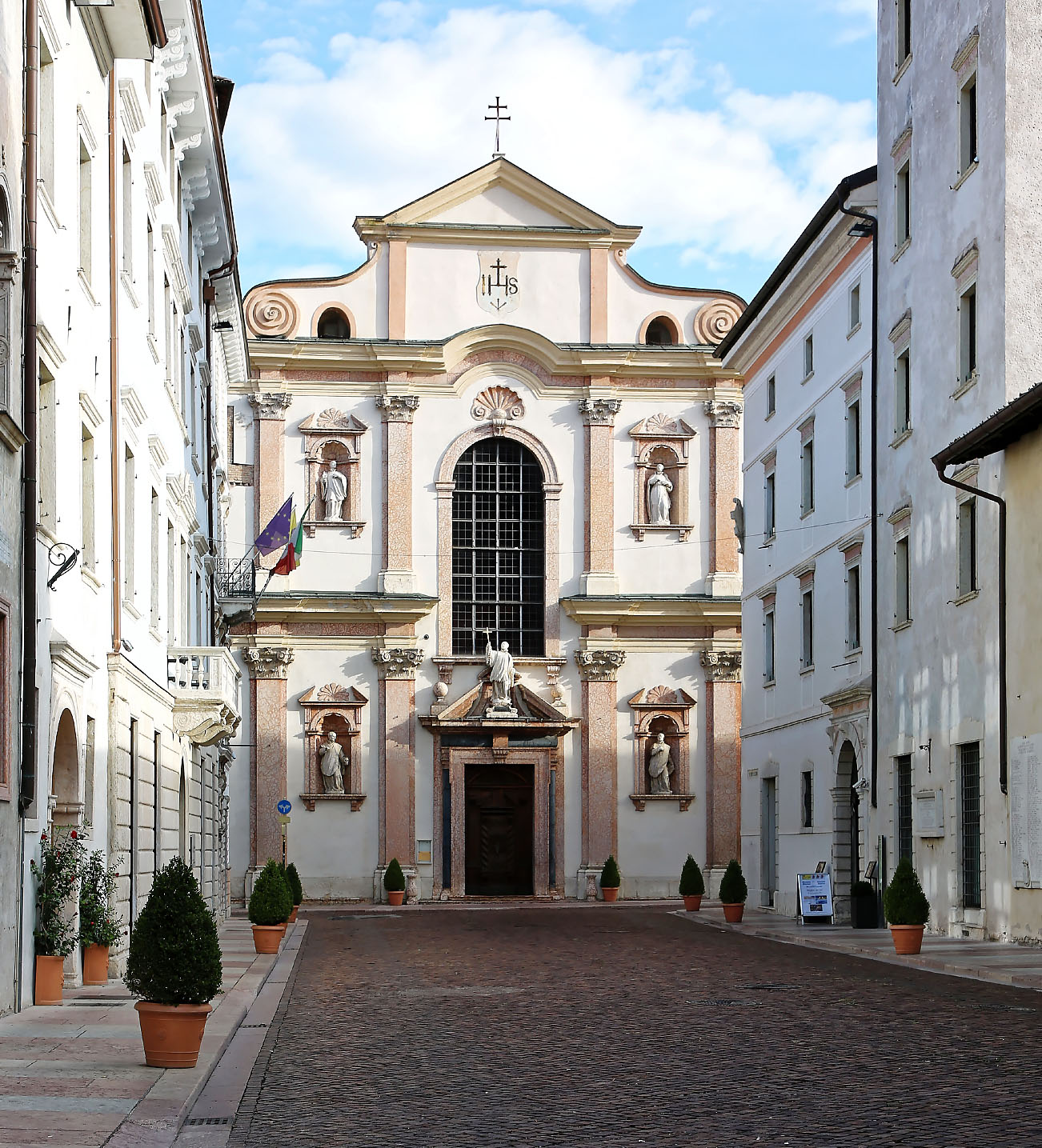
- Clockwise from top: Aerial view of Trento, Piazza Duomo, Fontana del Nettuno with Cathedral of Trento behind, Castello del Buonconsiglio and Church of San Francesco Saverio

- Flag Coat of arms

- Location within Italy Location within Trentino-Alto Adige/Südtirol
- Coordinates: 46°04′N 11°07′E
- Country: Italy
- Region: Trentino-Alto Adige/Südtirol
- Province: Trentino (TN)
- Frazioni: see list

Government
  - Mayor: Franco Ianeselli (centre-left independent)

Area
  - Total: 157.88 km^{2} (60.96 sq mi)
- Elevation: 194 m (636 ft)

Population (2026)
  - Total: 119,359
  - Density: 756.01/km^{2} (1,958.1/sq mi)
- Demonym(s): Trentini, Tridentini
- Time zone: UTC+1 (CET)
  - Summer (DST): UTC+2 (CEST)
- Postal code: 38121-38122-38123
- Dialing code: 0461
- Patron saint: Saint Vigilius
- Saint day: June 26
- Website: Official website

Trento, (Note: Italian: [ˈtrento] or [ˈtrɛnto]; Ladin and Lombard: Trent; German: Trient [tʁiˈɛnt]; Cimbrian: Tria; Mòcheno: Trea't; Venetian: Trénto or Trènt; Latin: Tridentum.) also known in English as Trent, is a city on the Adige River in the autonomous region of Trentino-Alto Adige/Südtirol in northern Italy. It is the capital of the autonomous province of Trento (Trentino). In the 16th century, the city was the location of the Council of Trent. It was part of Austria and Austria-Hungary before it was annexed by Italy in 1919. With a population of 119,359 as of 2026, Trento is the third largest municipality in the Alps and second largest in the historical region of Tyrol.

Trento is an educational, scientific, financial and political centre in Trentino-Alto Adige/Südtirol, in Tyrol and in Northern Italy in general. The city contains a picturesque Medieval and Renaissance historic centre, with ancient buildings such as Trento Cathedral and the Castello del Buonconsiglio.

Together with other Alpine towns, Trento engages in the Alpine Town of the Year Association for the implementation of the Alpine Convention to achieve sustainable development in the Alpine Arc. Trento was awarded the title of Alpine Town of the Year 2004.

The city often ranks highly among Italian cities for quality of life, standard of living, and business and job opportunities, being ranked 3rd in 2023. Trento is also one of the nation's wealthiest and most prosperous cities, with its province being one of the richest in Italy, with a GDP per capita of €46,100 and a nominal GDP of €25.5 billion in 2023.

The University of Trento, founded in 1962 as a Higher University Institute of Social Sciences, is one of the most prestigious medium-small Italian universities, with a strong international vocation. It ranks 1st among 'medium-sized' Universities in the Censis ranking and 2nd in the Il Sole 24 Ore ranking of Italian universities.

The School of International Studies of the University of Trento is a member of the Association of Professional Schools of International Affairs (Apsia), a selected group of institutions for higher education in the field of international relations. It is the first, and currently only, Italian institute and one of the few European institutes in the club of the best international study schools in the world that form policy makers.

In the last twenty years, thanks to the gradual creation of various research centers (Fondazione Bruno Kessler, Edmund Mach Foundation) and laboratories in the IT, engineering and sciences fields, Trento and its university have been nicknamed the "Silicon Valley of the Alps".

== History ==
The origins of Trento are uncertain. It lies on the river-route to Bolzano and the low Alpine passes of Brenner and the Reschen Pass through the Alps. Some scholars maintain it was a Rhaetian settlement: the Adige area was however influenced by neighbouring populations, including the (Adriatic) Veneti, the Etruscans and the Gauls (a Celtic population). According to other theories, the latter instead founded the city during the 4th century BC.

Trento was conquered by the Romans in the 1st century BC, after several clashes with the Rhaetian tribes. Julius Caesar re-founded it as a Roman municipality when Rome extended citizenship to the part of Cisalpine Gaul north of the River Po. The Latin name given to the settlement was Tridentum, meaning "Three-tooth place" or "Trident-town" (tri- "three" + dēns, dent- "tooth"). The reason for the name is uncertain: the new town may have been consecrated to the god Neptune, or possibly named after the three hills that surround the city (known in Italian as Doss Trento, Doss di Sant'Agata and Doss di San Rocco). The Latin name is the source of the adjective "tridentine". On the old city hall, a Latin inscription is still visible: "Montes argentum mihi dant nomenque Tridentum" ("Mountains give me silver and the name of Trento"), attributed to Fra' Bartolomeo da Trento (died in 1251). Tridentum became an important stop on the Roman road that led from Verona to Innsbruck.

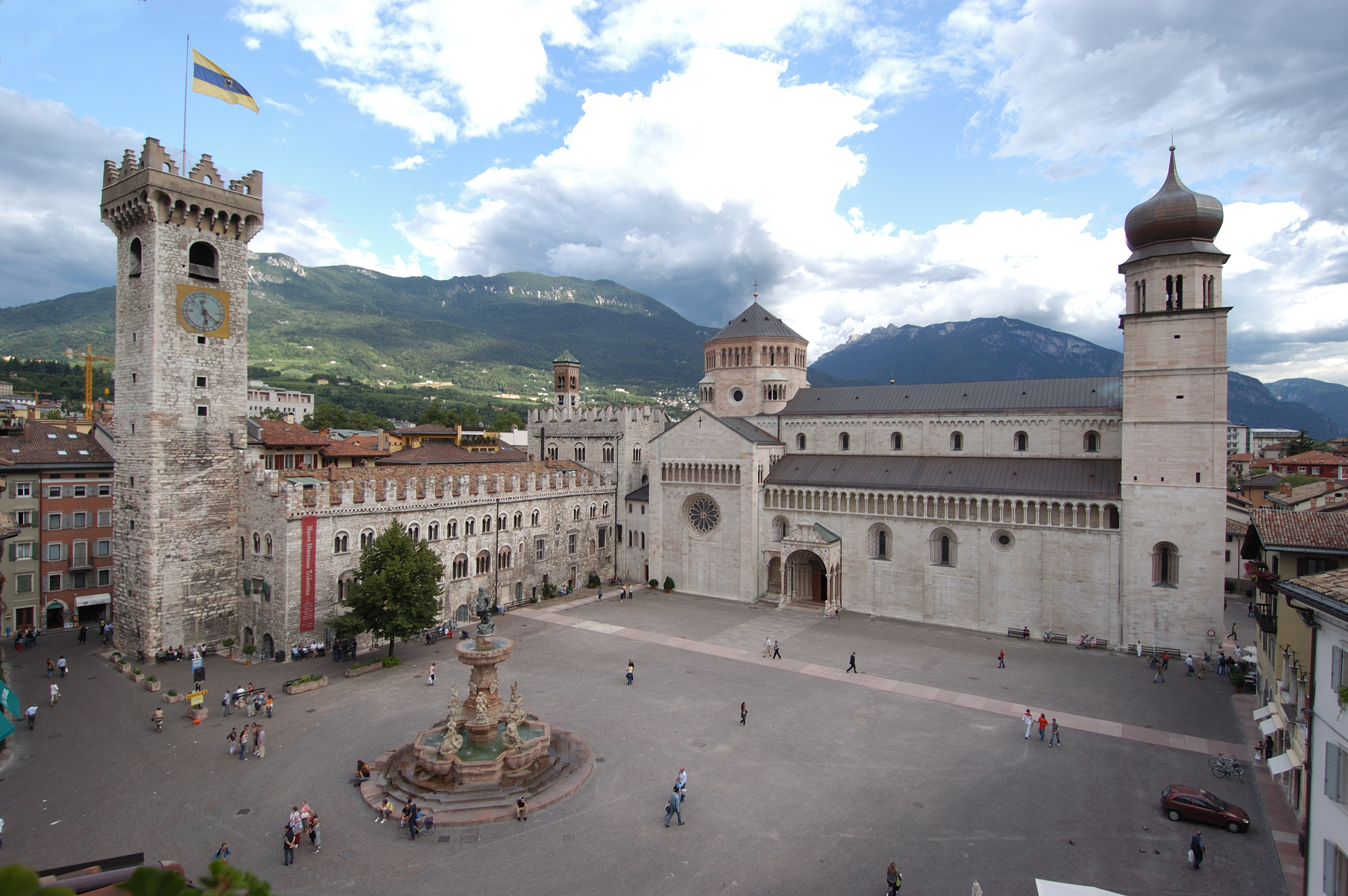
Palazzo pretorio and Duomo

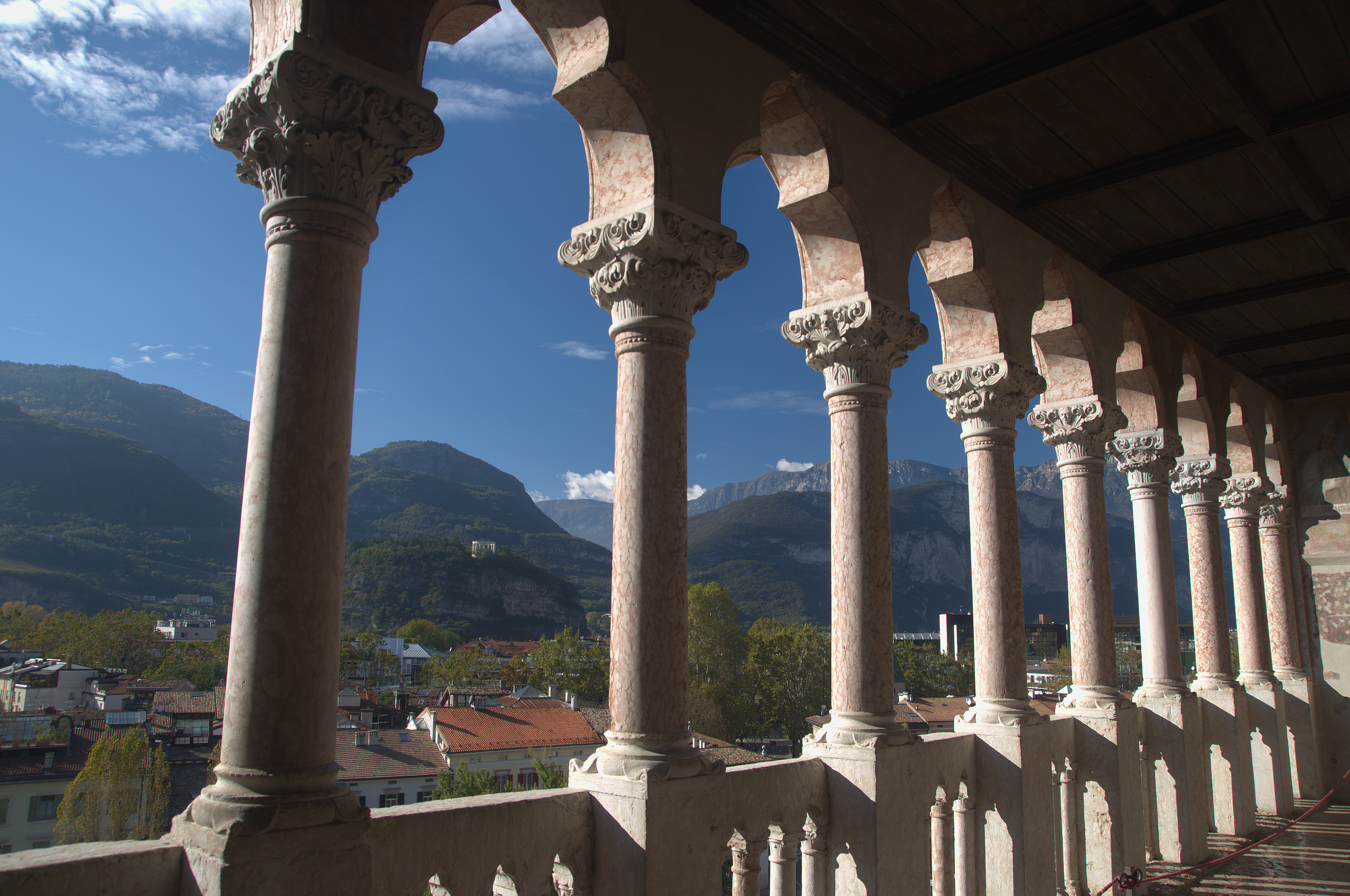
Loggia of Buonconsiglio Castle in International Gothic style

After the fall of the Western Roman Empire, the independent bishopric of Trento was conquered by Ostrogoths, Byzantines, Lombards and Franks, finally becoming part of the Holy Roman Empire. In 1027, Emperor Conrad II created the Prince-Bishops of Trento, who wielded both temporal and religious powers. In the following centuries, however, the sovereignty was divided between the Bishopric of Trent and the County of Tyrol (from 1363 part of the Habsburg monarchy). Around 1200, Trento became a mining center of some significance: silver was mined from the Monte Calisio – Khalisperg, and Prince-Bishop Federico Wanga issued the first mining code of the alpine region.

In the 14th century, the Habsburg Family that ruled as dukes of Austria were also the counts of Tyrol.

A dark episode in the history of Trento was the murder of a 3-year-old Christian boy, Simonino, later known as Simon of Trent, who disappeared in 1475 on the eve of Good Friday; the city's small Jewish community was accused of killing him and draining his blood for Jewish ritual purposes. Eight Jews were tortured and burned at the stake, and their families forced to convert to Christianity. The bishop of Trento, Johannes Hinderbach, sought (without success) to have Simonino canonized and published the first book printed in Trento, Story of a Christian Child Murdered at Trento, embellished with 12 woodcuts. In a governmental ceremony in the 1990s, Trento apologized to the Jewish community for this dark episode and unveiled a plaque commemorating the formal apology.

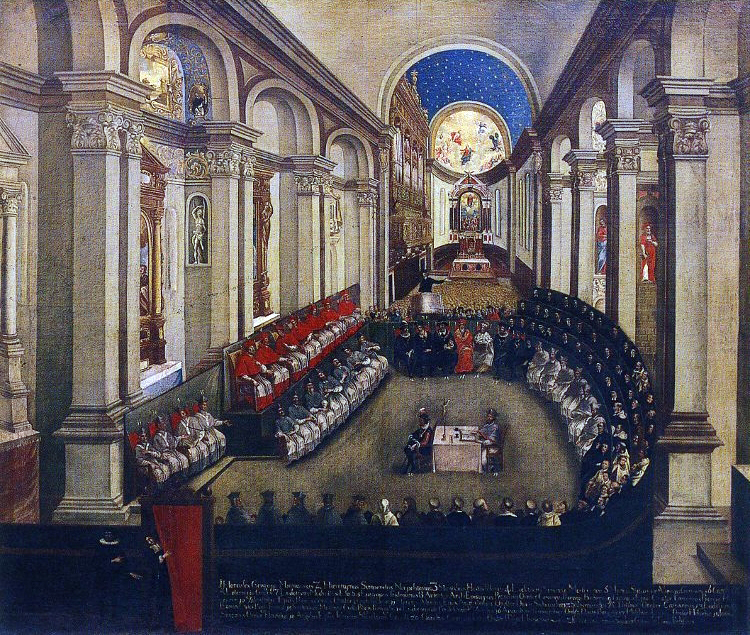
Council of Trent

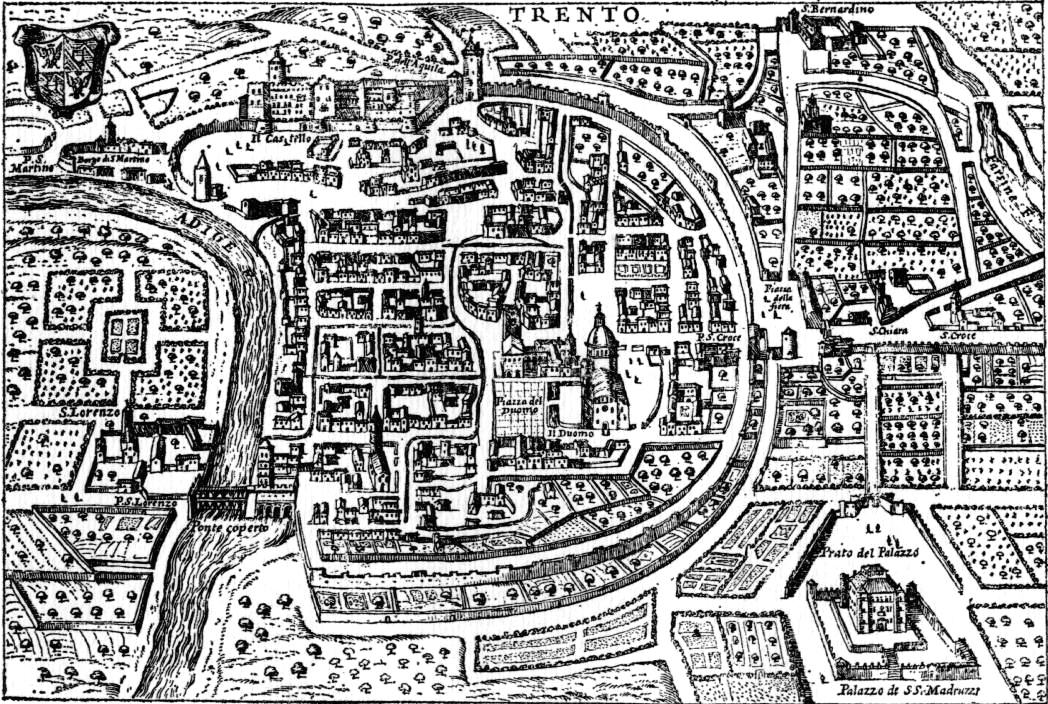
18th-century copy of a late 16th-century map of Trento, northeast at top, showing walled old city and original course of the Adige

In the 16th century, Trento became notable for the Council of Trent (1545–1563), a council that convened to create a formal reply to the Protestant Reformation, which was a major event in the Counter-Reformation. The adjective Tridentine (as in "Tridentine Mass") literally means pertaining to Trento, but can also refer to that specific event. Among the notable prince-bishops of this time were Bernardo Clesio (who governed the city from 1514 to 1539 and managed to steer the council to Trento) and Cristoforo Madruzzo (who governed from 1539 to 1567), both able European politicians and Renaissance humanists, who greatly expanded and embellished the city.

During this period, and as an expression of this Humanism, Trento was also known as the site of a Jewish printing press. In 1558 Cardinal Madruzzo granted the privilege of printing Hebrew books to Joseph Ottolengo, a German rabbi. The actual printer was Jacob Marcaria, a local physician; after his death in 1562, the activity of the press of Riva di Trento ceased. Altogether, 34 works were published in the period from 1558 to 1562, most of them bearing the coat of arms of Madruzzo.

Prince-bishops governed Trento until the Napoleonic era, when it changed hands among various states. Under the reorganization of the Holy Roman Empire in 1802, the Bishopric was secularized and annexed to the Habsburg territories. The Treaty of Pressburg in 1805 ceded Trento to Bavaria, and the Treaty of Schönbrunn four years later gave it to Napoleon's Kingdom of Italy.

The population staged armed resistance to French domination. The resistance leader was Andreas Hofer. During his youth, he lived in Italian Tyrol, where he learned the Italian language. When Hofer recovered Trento for the Austrians (1809), he was welcomed with enthusiasm by the population of Trento. Approximately 4,000 Trentinian volunteers (Sìzzeri or Schützen) died in battle against the French and Bavarian troops. In 1810, Hofer was captured and brought to Mantua, and was shot by French soldiers on the express order of Napoleon.

With Napoleon's defeat in 1814, Trento was annexed by the Habsburg Empire. Church government was finally extinguished, and Trento was henceforth governed by the secular administration of Tyrol. In the following decades, Trento experienced a modernization of administration and economy with the first railroad in the Adige valley opening in 1859. The entire Mediterranean basin was at risk of malaria, a factor that affected the entire Italian peninsula and this Alpine region was not spared. Even Tuscany was particularly hard hit; malaria existed far inland into the Veneto area, reaching the Italian Alps. From 1918 to 1940, government figures show Italy's malaria deaths decreased by 96%, due to the efforts of the Rockefeller Foundation and Italy's own malaria experts, who themselves were international leaders in malariology.

During the late 19th century, Trento and Trieste, cities with ethnic Italian majorities still belonging to the Austrians, became icons of the Italian irredentist movement. Benito Mussolini briefly joined the staff of a local newspaper in 1909, but left Trento because they could not create an anti-Austrian group. There was dissatisfaction with the lack of provincial autonomy and the failure to establish a university for the region. Feelings of loyalty were focused on the 'father-figure' emperor, not for Austria.

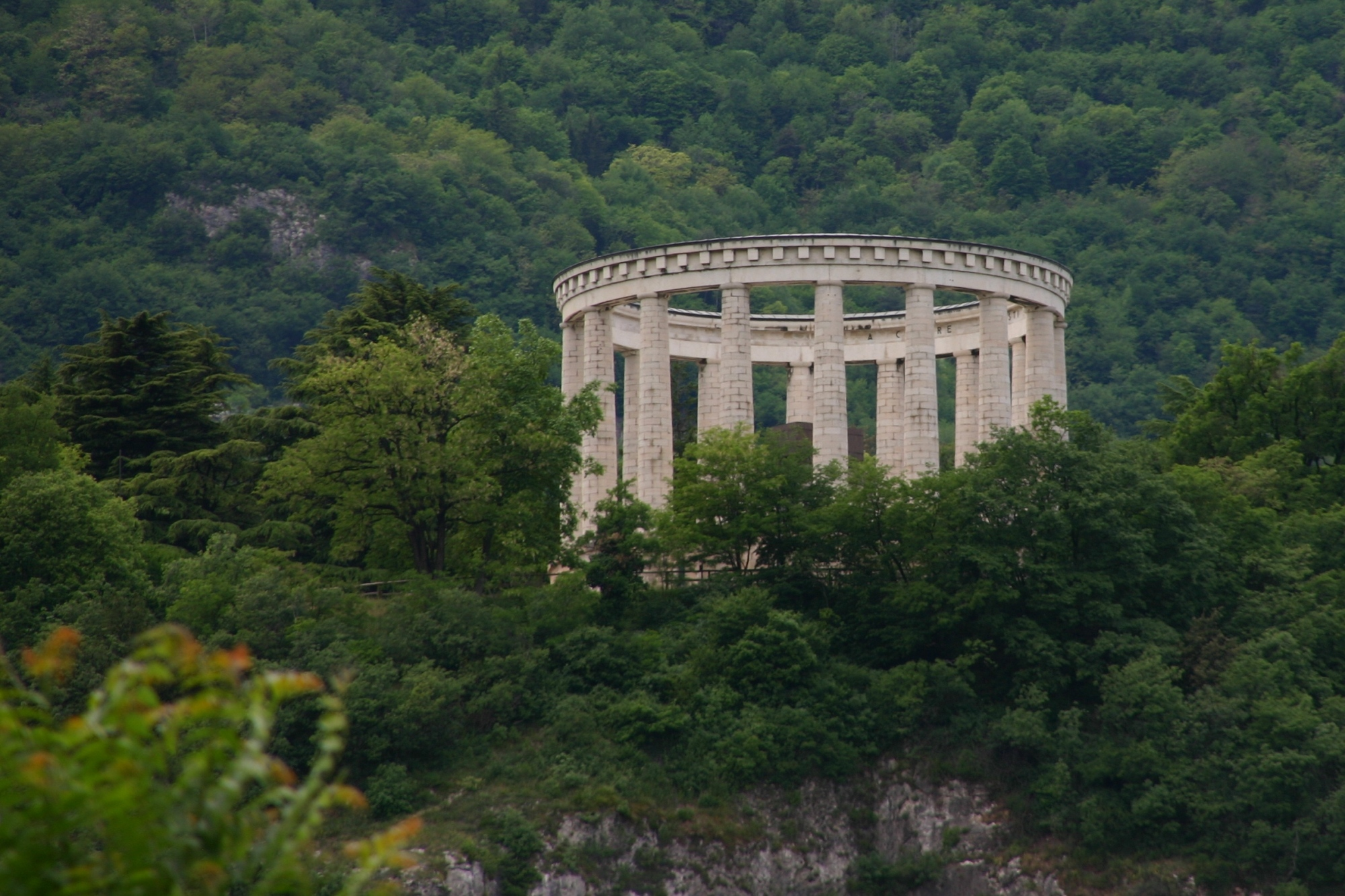
Mausoleum of Cesare Battisti

The nationalist cause led Italy into World War I. Damiano Chiesa and the deputy in the Austrian parliament Cesare Battisti were two well-known local irredentists who had joined the Italian Army to fight against Austria-Hungary with the aim of bringing the territory of Trento into the new Kingdom of Italy. The two men were taken prisoners at the nearby southern front. They were put on trial for high treason and executed in the courtyard of Castello del Buonconsiglio.

The region was greatly affected during the war, and some of its fiercest battles were fought on the surrounding mountains in the southernmost regions and the southeast. Of a population of just less than 400,000 in the province, 55,000 men served in the Imperial and Royal Army of whom 11,000 died. Most served on the Galician front; 700 served with the Italian Army. After World War I, Trento and its Italian-speaking province, along with Bolzano (Bozen) and the part of Tyrol that stretched south of the Alpine watershed (which was primarily German-speaking, and still is to this day), were annexed by Italy.

In July 1943 Mussolini was removed as Prime Minister when the allies invaded Sicily. Italy surrendered to the Allies, and declared war on Germany. German troops promptly invaded northern Italy and the provinces of Trento, Belluno and South Tyrol became part of the Operation Zone of the Alpine Foothills, annexed to Germany. Some German-speakers wanted revenge upon Italian-speakers living in the area, but were mostly prevented by the occupying German troops, who still considered Mussolini head of the Italian Social Republic and wanted to preserve good relations with the Italians. From November 1944 to April 1945, Trento was bombed as part of the so-called "Battle of the Brenner". War supplies from Germany to support the Gothic Line were for the most part routed via the rail line through the Brenner Pass. Over 6,849 sorties were flown by the Allies over targets from Verona to the Brenner Pass, with 10,267 tons of bombs dropped. Parts of the city were hit by the Allied bombings, including the church of S. Maria Maggiore, the Church of the Annunciation and several bridges over the Adige river. In spite of the bombings, most of the medieval and renaissance city center was spared. It was finally liberated on 3 May 1945.

In 1947, Trento became the host of the Rally Stella Alpina.

Since the 1950s, the region has enjoyed prosperous growth, thanks in part to its special autonomy from the central Italian government.

On 4 August 2015, the cathedral tower caught fire by "spontaneous combustion". The clock stopped at 10:50 AM, a matter of minutes after the fire began.

In 2020, Trento was listed as the most sustainable city in Italy, according to the Smart City Index.

== Geography ==
The township of Trento encompasses the city centre as well as many suburbs of extremely varied geographical and population conditions (from the industrial suburb of Gardolo, just north of the city, to tiny mountain hamlets on Monte Bondone). Various distinctive suburbs still retain their traditional identity of rural or mountain villages.

Trento lies in a wide glacial valley known as the Adige valley, just south of the Dolomite Mountains, where the Fersina River and Avisio rivers join the Adige River (the second longest river in Italy). River Adige is one of the three primary south-flowing Alpine rivers; its broadly curving course alongside Trento was straightened in 1850. The valley is surrounded by mountains, including Vigolana (2,150 m (7,050 ft)), Monte Bondone (2,181 m (7,156 ft)), Paganella (2,124 m (6,969 ft)), Marzola (1,747 m (5,732 ft)) and Monte Calisio (1,096 m (3,596 ft)). Nearby lakes include Lake Caldonazzo, Lake Levico, Lake Garda and Lake Toblino.

=== Frazioni ===
Frazioni, or subdivisions of Trento:

- Povo
- Villazzano
- Gardolo
- Roncafort
- Mattarello
- Martignano
- Cognola
- Ravina
- Romagnano
- Montevaccino
- Vela
- Meano
- Sardagna
- Sopramonte
- Vigo Meano
- Cortesano
- Gazzadina
- Candriai
- Vaneze
- Cadine
- Vigolo Baselga

=== Climate ===
The municipality of Trento stretches across a wide range of altitude levels, going from just under 200 m above sea level at the city centre, to 400 m in Povo and Cognola, to 2000 m above sea level at Monte Bondone, boroughs at higher elevation, for instance Viote, have a colder alpine climate (Dw). Urban Trento has a humid subtropical-continental climate (Cfa-Dfa) according to the Köppen climate classification. Monthly average temperatures range between 1.6 °C (January) and 23.4 °C (July). Average annual precipitation exceeds 900 mm spread out on an average of 87 days, with peaks in late spring (May–June, 90 mm monthly average in 9–10 rain days) and autumn (October–November: 100–110 mm monthly average in 7–8 days), and lows in winter (January–February, 30–40 mm monthly average in 3–4 rain days). Winters are cold to freezing, with infrequent snowfall but usual frost from mid-November to mid-March. In winter, daytime highs may not exceed 5 °C and lows may rarely dip down to -10 °C, but the former usually stand around 8°C, while the latter usually hover between -3 °C to 0 °C. Spring brings unpredictable weather with wind blowing north to south or vice-versa through the valley. Many spring days are pleasant, but the transition may be very quick, for example going from frosty mornings to 30 °C in two months. In May, it is possible to have either rainy days with daytime highs below 18 °C, or sunny days with the temperature soaring up to 30 °C. Summers are hot, sometimes sweltering, with highs getting to 35 °C at least for a week a year and more rarely to 38 °C. Summer nights can be hot as well, with overnight lows hovering around 22-24 °C (in the hilly suburbs east, north and west of Trento summer nights can be much cooler, with overnight temperature differing by up to 6 °C from the ones experienced in the city centre). Early fall is pleasant, with foliage starting around mid-October at higher elevations, late October in the uphill suburbs and in November downtown. Fall days can be humid, grey and dim, with temperatures rapidly declining through October and November. The first snowfall in the suburbs may occur as early as late November, with December and early January being the snowiest period of the year.

Climate data for Trento Laste, elevation: 312 m (1981–2010, extremes 1958–2010)
Month	Jan	Feb	Mar	Apr	May	Jun	Jul	Aug	Sep	Oct	Nov	Dec	Year
Record high °C (°F)	19.2 (66.6)	23.6 (74.5)	29.0 (84.2)	31.0 (87.8)	37.4 (99.3)	38.9 (102.0)	39.5 (103.1)	41.4 (106.5)	33.5 (92.3)	28.3 (82.9)	22.8 (73.0)	16.6 (61.9)	41.4 (106.5)
Mean daily maximum °C (°F)	5.2 (41.4)	9.2 (48.6)	15.2 (59.4)	18.5 (65.3)	23.1 (73.6)	26.8 (80.2)	29.4 (84.9)	28.3 (82.9)	22.8 (73.0)	16.4 (61.5)	9.5 (49.1)	4.9 (40.8)	17.4 (63.3)
Daily mean °C (°F)	1.6 (34.9)	4.3 (39.7)	9.5 (49.1)	13.0 (55.4)	17.6 (63.7)	21.1 (70.0)	23.4 (74.1)	22.5 (72.5)	17.8 (64.0)	12.4 (54.3)	5.9 (42.6)	1.7 (35.1)	12.6 (54.7)
Mean daily minimum °C (°F)	−2.1 (28.2)	−0.6 (30.9)	3.9 (39.0)	7.6 (45.7)	12.2 (54.0)	15.4 (59.7)	17.4 (63.3)	16.7 (62.1)	12.8 (55.0)	8.3 (46.9)	2.4 (36.3)	−1.5 (29.3)	7.7 (45.9)
Record low °C (°F)	−15.2 (4.6)	−11.3 (11.7)	−10.1 (13.8)	−2.7 (27.1)	1.5 (34.7)	6.3 (43.3)	9.5 (49.1)	7.2 (45.0)	3.3 (37.9)	−3.7 (25.3)	−6.6 (20.1)	−12.3 (9.9)	−15.2 (4.6)
Average precipitation mm (inches)	42.1 (1.66)	33.9 (1.33)	54.0 (2.13)	78.1 (3.07)	94.4 (3.72)	92.4 (3.64)	86.7 (3.41)	83.8 (3.30)	82.3 (3.24)	116.8 (4.60)	106.2 (4.18)	65.8 (2.59)	936.6 (36.87)
Average snowfall cm (inches)	19.2 (7.6)	9.8 (3.9)	3.1 (1.2)	0.3 (0.1)	0.0 (0.0)	0.0 (0.0)	0.0 (0.0)	0.0 (0.0)	0.0 (0.0)	0.1 (0.0)	2.8 (1.1)	14.3 (5.6)	49.6 (19.5)
Average precipitation days	4.0	3.4	5.7	8.2	9.5	9.5	8.2	8.1	7.0	7.6	7.1	5.5	83.7
Average relative humidity (%)	69	66	66	69	72	71	71	72	73	77	75	59	70
Source 1: Agenzia Provinciale per la Protezione dell'Ambiente
Source 2: Meteotrentino

== Demographics ==
Historical population
Year	Pop.	±%
1921	51,174	—
1931	55,054	+7.6%
1936	56,656	+2.9%
1951	62,887	+11.0%
1961	75,753	+20.5%
1971	91,768	+21.1%
1981	99,179	+8.1%
1991	101,545	+2.4%
2001	104,946	+3.3%
2011	114,198	+8.8%
2021	117,847	+3.2%
Source: ISTAT

As of 2026, the population is 119,359, of which 49.0% are males, and 51.0% are females. Minors make up 15.2% of the population, and seniors make up 24.9%.

=== Immigration ===
As of 2025, immigrants make up 16.7% of the population. The 5 largest foreign countries of birth are Albania, Moldova, Pakistan, Romania, and Morocco.

Foreign-born population (2025)
Country of birth	Population
Albania	1,852
Moldova	1,798
Pakistan	1,671
Romania	1,367
Morocco	1,240
Ukraine	1,205
Tunisia	528
Brazil	500
Colombia	452
Germany	436
India	406
North Macedonia	402
China	370
Switzerland	365
Argentina	330

== Politics ==
=== Government ===
Trento is governed by the City Council of Trento. Voters elect directly 40 councilors and the mayor of Trento every five years. The current mayor of Trento is Franco Ianeselli, elected for the first time on 21 September 2020. Ianeselli, a former trade unionist, was elected as a left-leaning independent with the support of a wide coalition of parties. These parties ranged from the left (as in the case of Europa Verde) to the Catholic centre (including Partito Autonomista Trentino Tirolese, and Insieme per Trento). When determining the composition of his Giunta (the equivalent of a City Cabinet), Ianeselli selected seven members of the City Council: Monica Baggia, Elisabetta Bozzarelli, Mariachiara Franzoia, Chiara Maule, Salvatore Panetta, Roberto Stanchina, and Paolo Zanella. However, in late November 2020 Paolo Zanella announced he would leave his position as a member of the Giunta, in order to fill a vacancy in one of the 35 seats of the legislative assembly of the Trentino province, upon the resignation of member Paolo Ghezzi. Shortly after, mayor Ianeselli announced Ezio Facchin as Zanella's successor.

=== Euroregion Tyrol-South Tyrol-Trentino ===
In 1996, a joint session between the states, further cultural and economic integration between the Austrian province of Tyrol and the Italian autonomous provinces of South Tyrol and Trentino was mutually agreed on. This activity was steadily extended, eventually followed by the creation of the Euroregion Tyrol-South Tyrol-Trentino in 2011.

== Sights ==
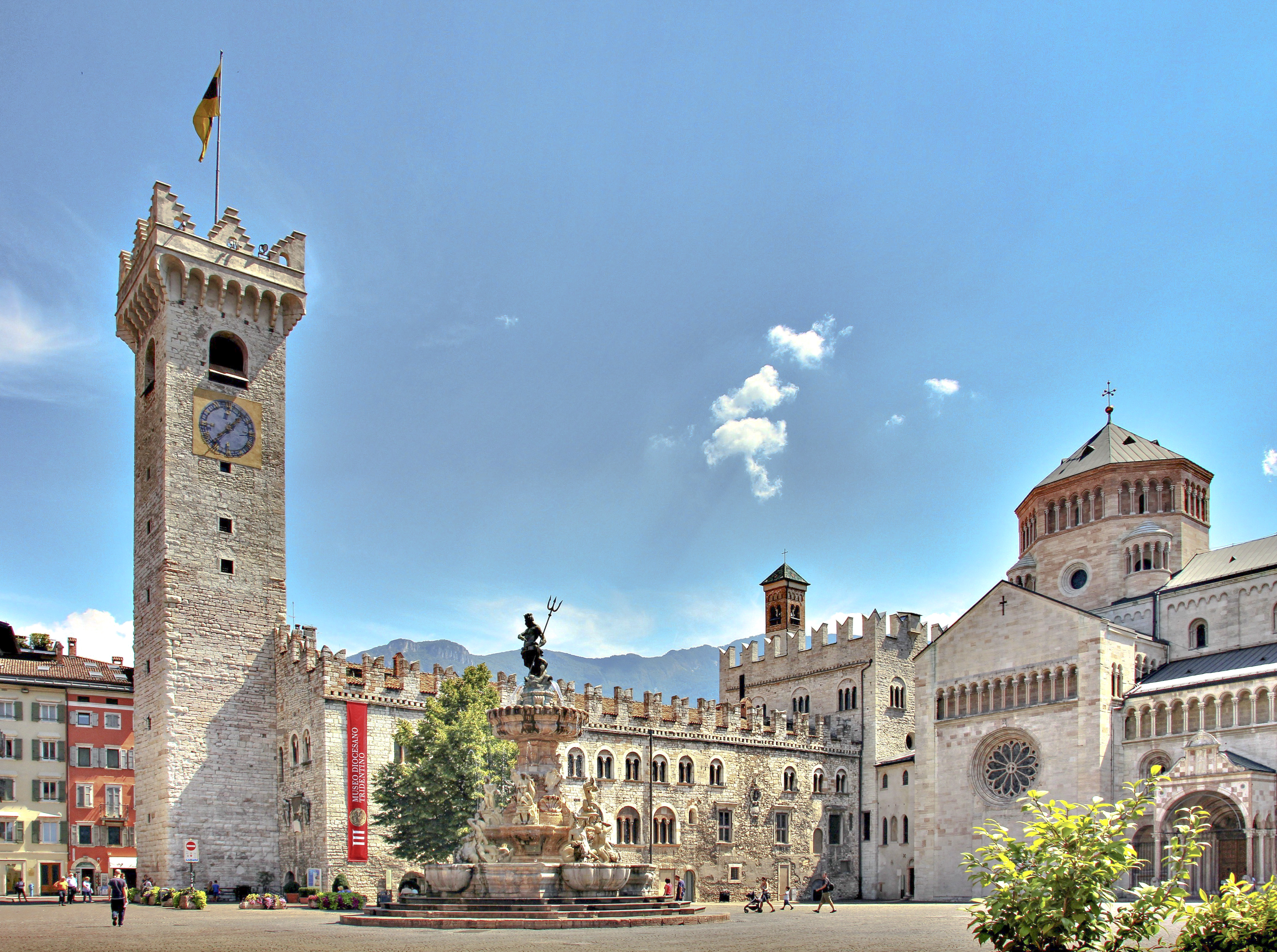
Palazzo Pretorio and Duomo

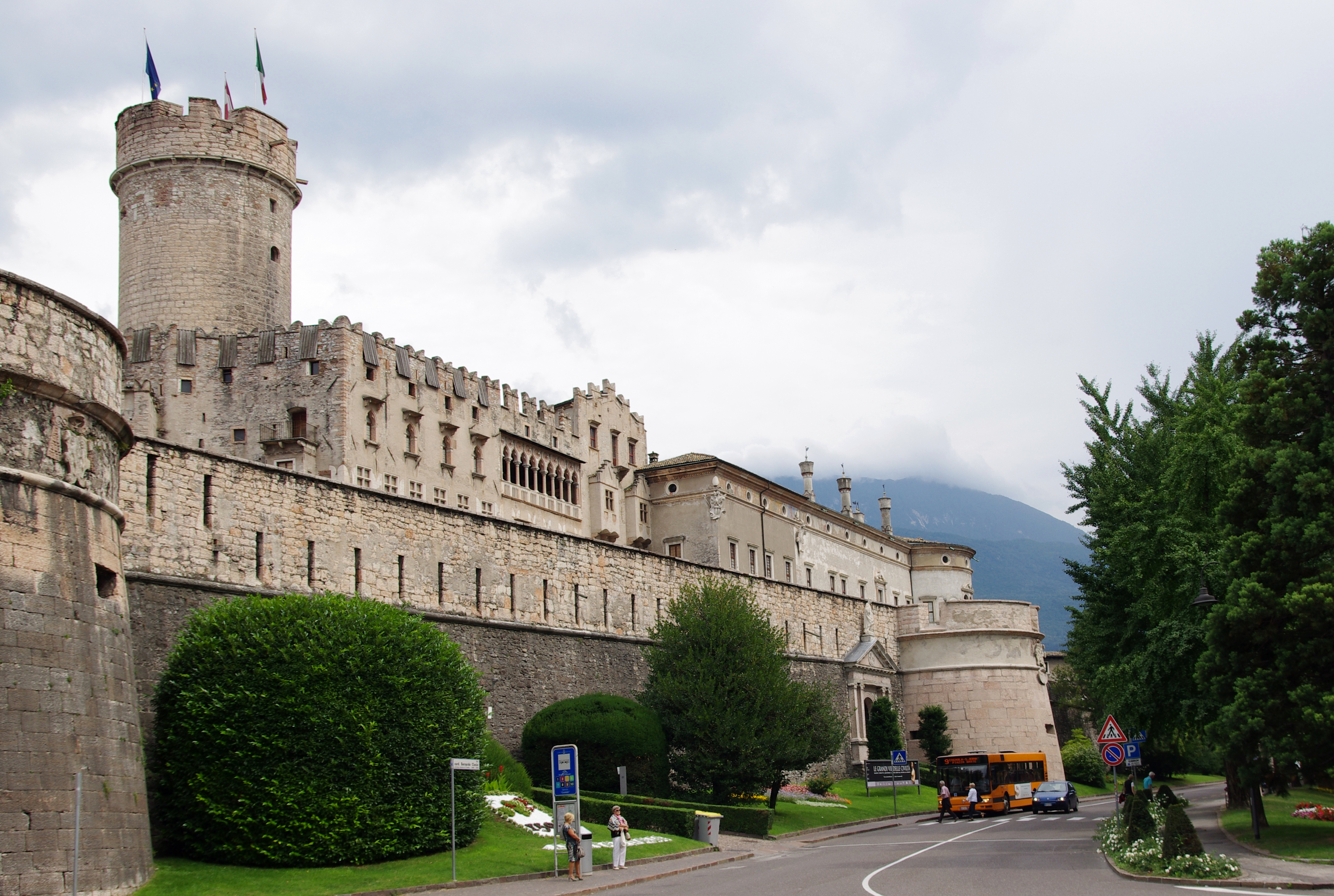
Buonconsiglio Castle

Although off the beaten path of mass tourism, Trento offers rather interesting monuments. Its architecture has a unique feel, with both Italian Renaissance and Roman influences. The city center is small, and most Late-Medieval and Renaissance buildings have been restored to their original pastel colours and wooden balconies. Part of the medieval city walls is still visible in Piazza Fiera, along with a circular tower. Once, these walls encircled the entire city and were connected to the Castello del Buonconsiglio. The main monuments of the city include:

- Cattedrale di San Vigilio (Cathedral of Saint Vigilius), also known as Duomo di Trento (12th–13thcentury) is a Romanesque-Gothic cathedral built on top of a late-Roman basilica (viewable in an underground crypt).
- Piazza Duomo (1767–1768), on the side of the cathedral, has frescoed Renaissance buildings and the Late Baroque Fountain of Neptune (Fontana del Nettuno).
- Church of Santa Maria Maggiore (1520), site of the preparatory congregations of the Third Council of Trent (April 1562 – December 1563). It was built for Bishop Bernardo Clesio by the architect Antonio Medaglia in Renaissance-Gothic style. The façade has a notable 16th-century portal, while the interior has works by Giambettino Cignaroli and Moroni.
- Castello del Buonconsiglio (Buonconsiglio Castle) (13th century), which includes a museum and the notable Torre dell'Aquila, with a cycle of fine Gothic frescoes depicting the months, was commissioned by the prince-bishop Georg von Lichtenstein.
- Church of San Pietro (12th century) features a neo-Gothic façade added in 1848–1850.
- Church of Sant'Apollinare (13th century) is a Gothic church.
- Church of San Lorenzo (12th century) features a Romanesque apse.
- Torre Verde (Green Tower), along the former transit path of the Adige river, is said to be where persons executed in the name of the Prince-Bishop were deposited in the river.
- Palazzo delle Albere (Palace of the Trees), a Renaissance villa next to the Adige river built around 1550 by the Madruzzo family, now hosting a modern art museum.
- Palazzo Pretorio (12th century), next to the Duomo, with a bell tower (Torre Civica) of the 13th century that now hosts a collection of baroque paintings of religious themes. It was the main Bishops' residence until the mid-13th century.
- Palazzo Salvadori (1515) is one of the first examples of Renaissance civil architecture in the city.
- Palazzo Geremia (15th century) features a Renaissance exterior and Gothic interiors.
- Palazzo Lodron, built during the Council of Trent. The interior has a large fresco cycle.
- Various underground remains of the streets and villas of the Roman city (in Via Prepositura and Piazza Cesare Battisti).

Trento also sports modernist architecture, including the train station and the central post office, both by rationalist architect Angiolo Mazzoni. In particular, the train station (1934–36) is considered a landmark building of Italian railways architecture and combines many varieties of local stone with the most advanced building materials of the time: glass, reinforced concrete, metal. The post office was once decorated with colored windows by Fortunato Depero, but these were destroyed during bombings in World War II. Other buildings of that time include the Grand Hotel by Giovanni Lorenzi with some guest rooms furnished with futurist furniture by Depero, and the "R. Sanzio" Primary School built in 1931–34 and designed by Adalberto Libera.

=== Gallery ===
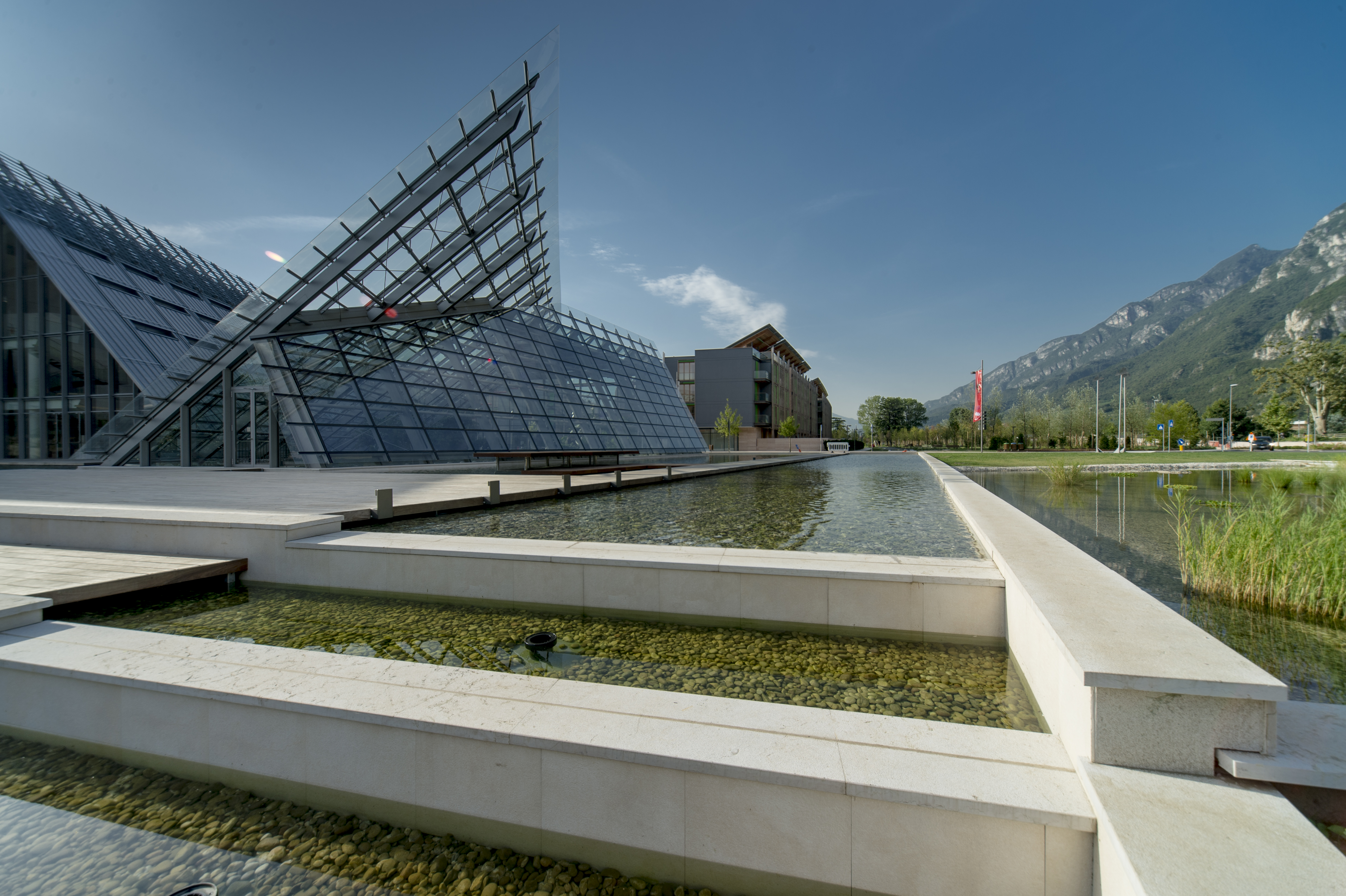
MUSE, the science museum designed by Renzo Piano

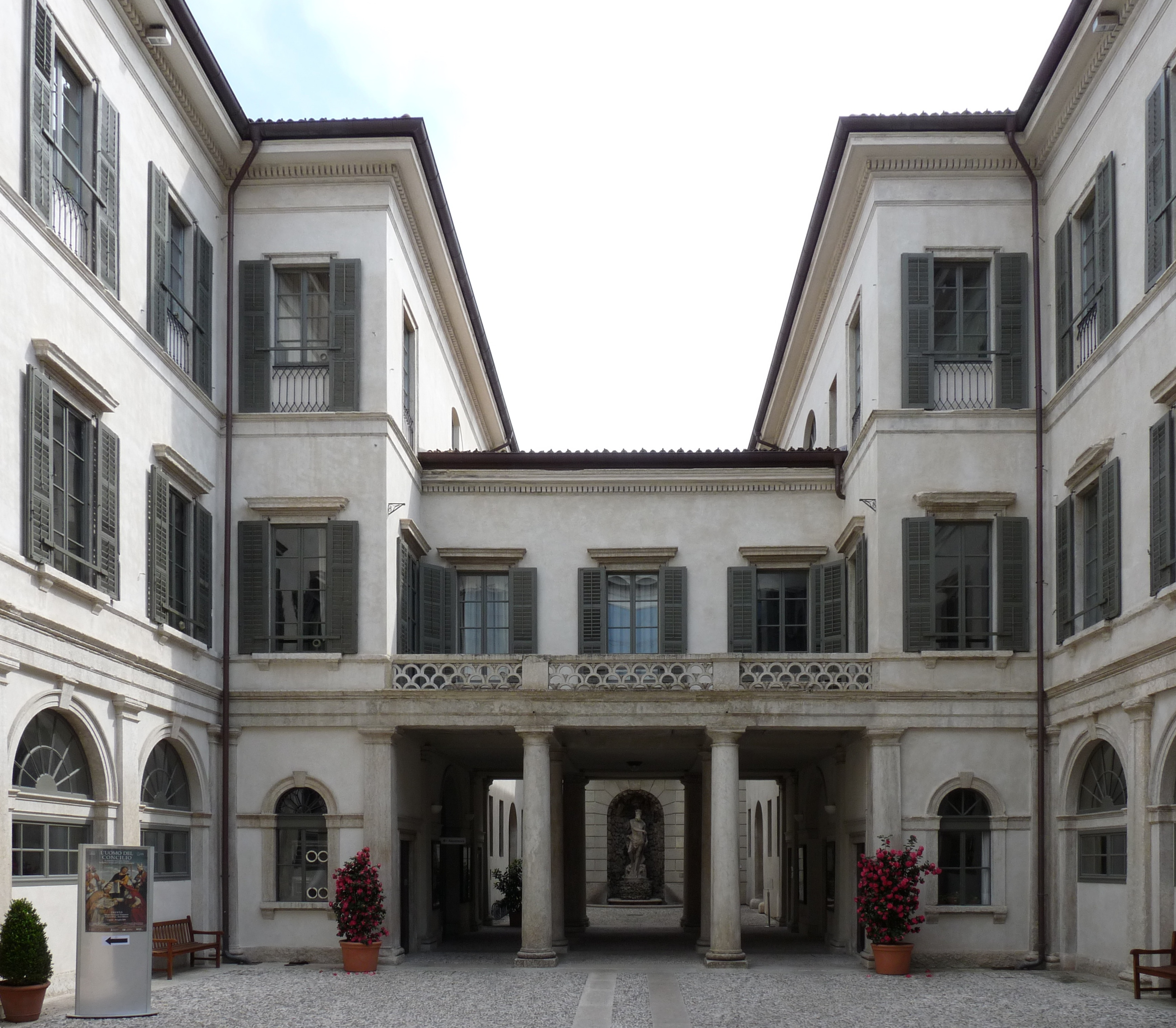
Palazzo Thun, seat of the mayor's office and the City Council

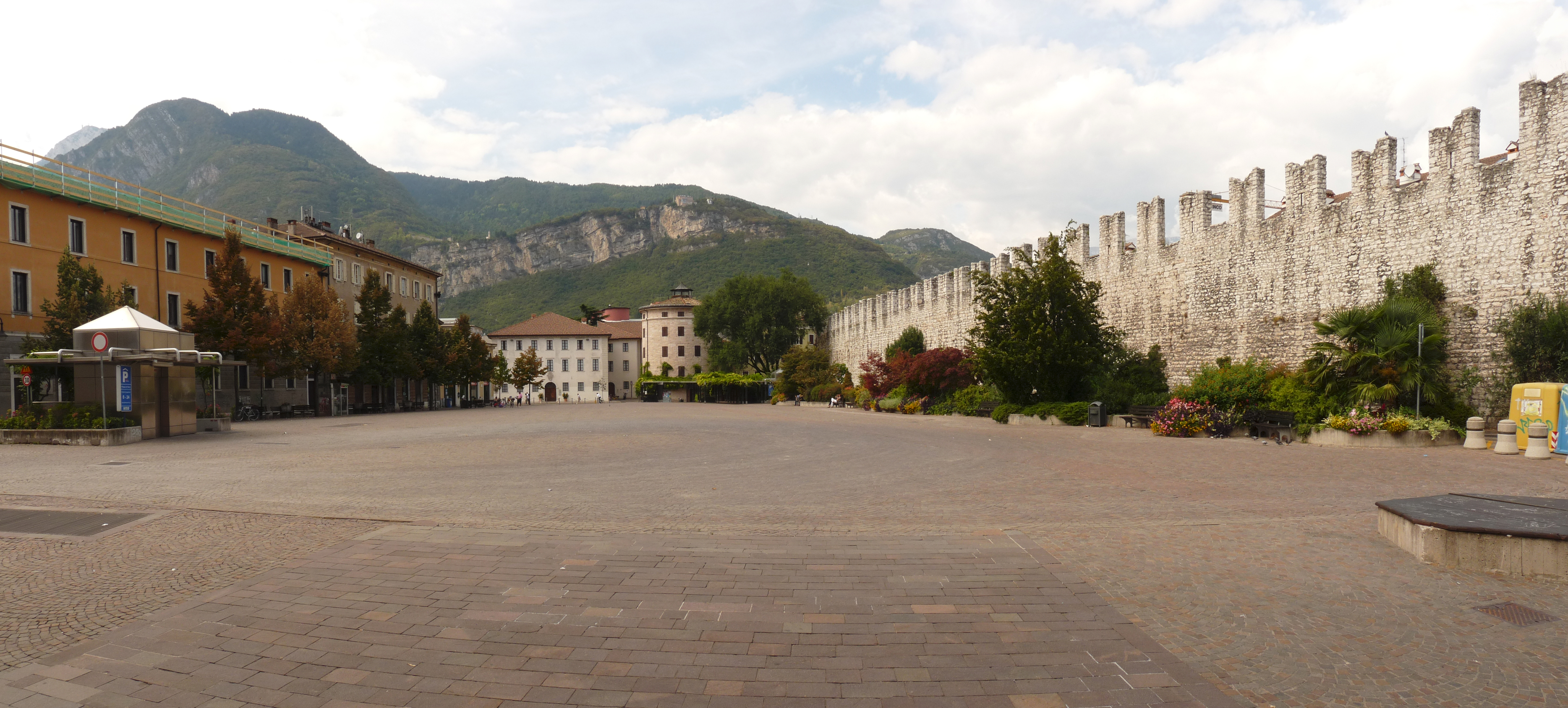
Piazza Fiera, with part of the former city wall on the right-hand side

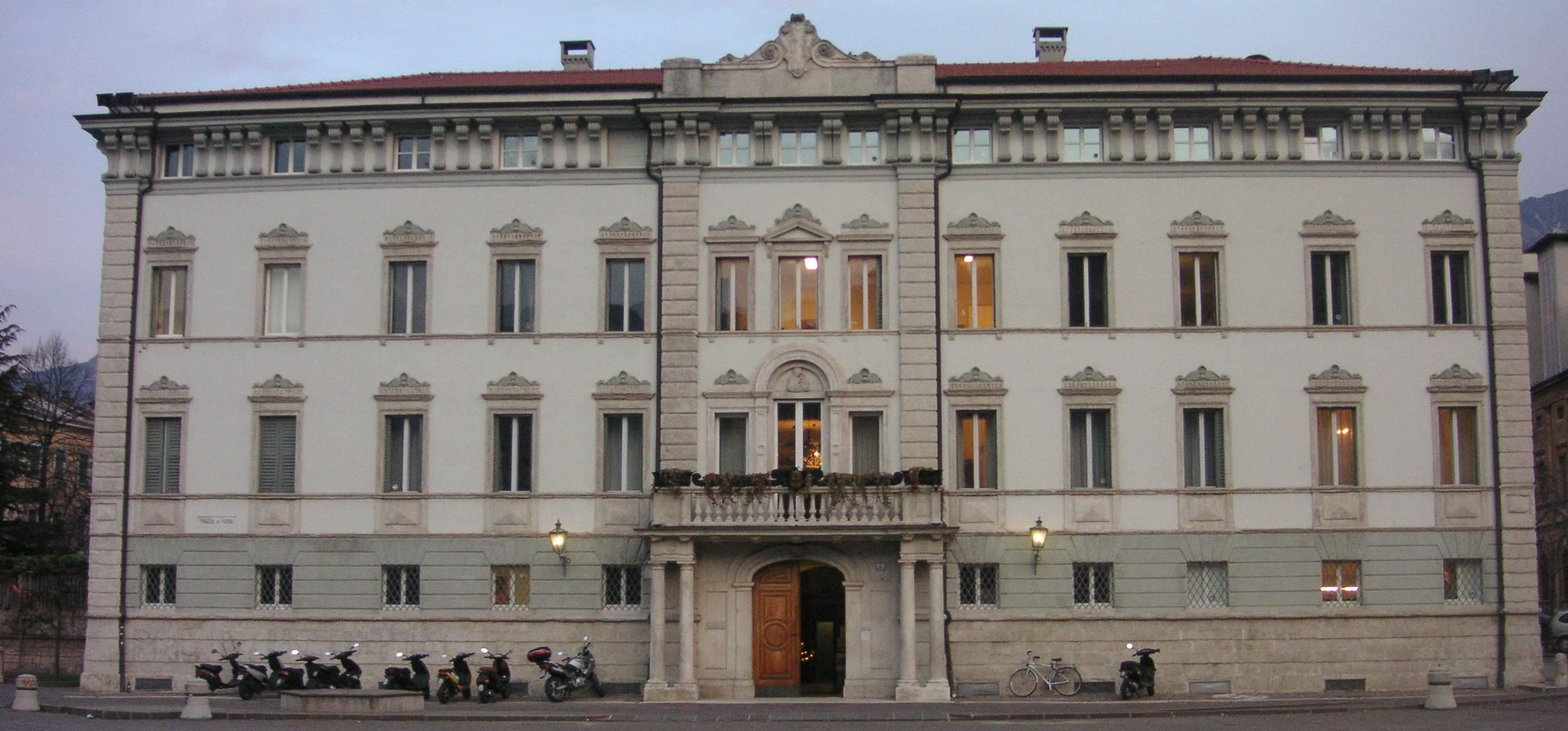
Palazzo Vescovile, seat of the local Catholic Diocese

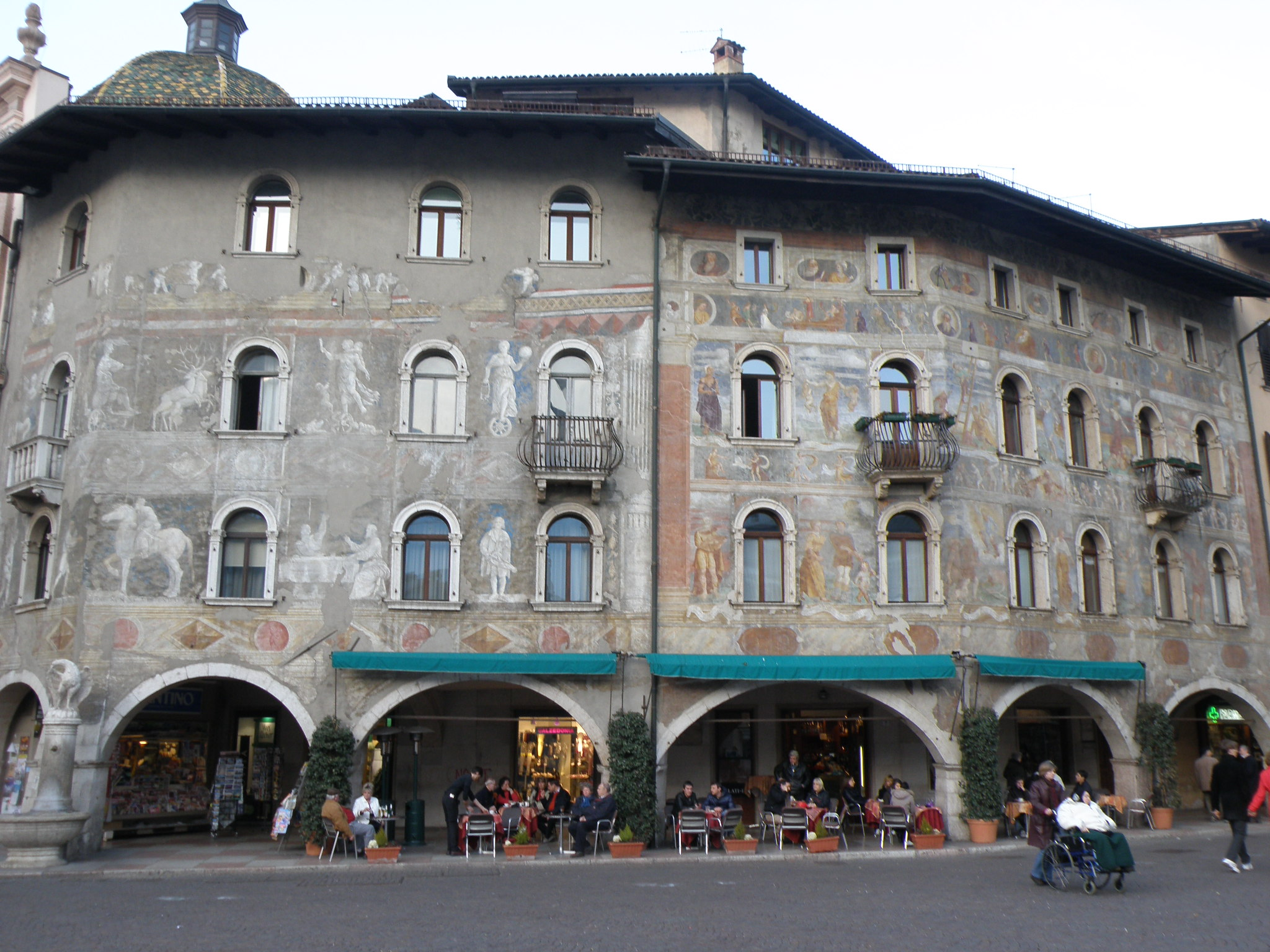
Casa Cazuffi and casa Rella, in the central Piazza Duomo

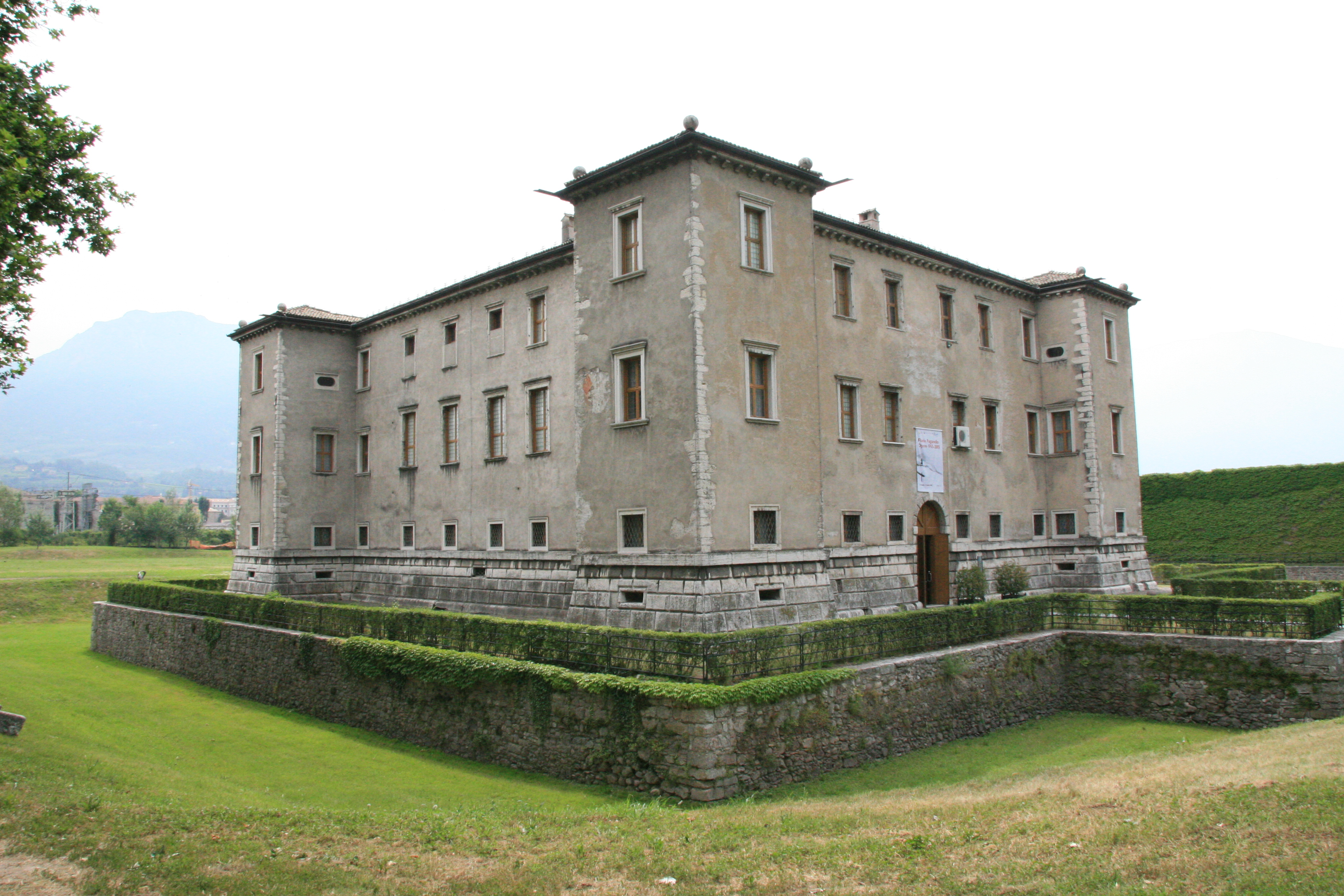
Palazzo delle Albere, formerly the Summer residence of the Prince-Bishop

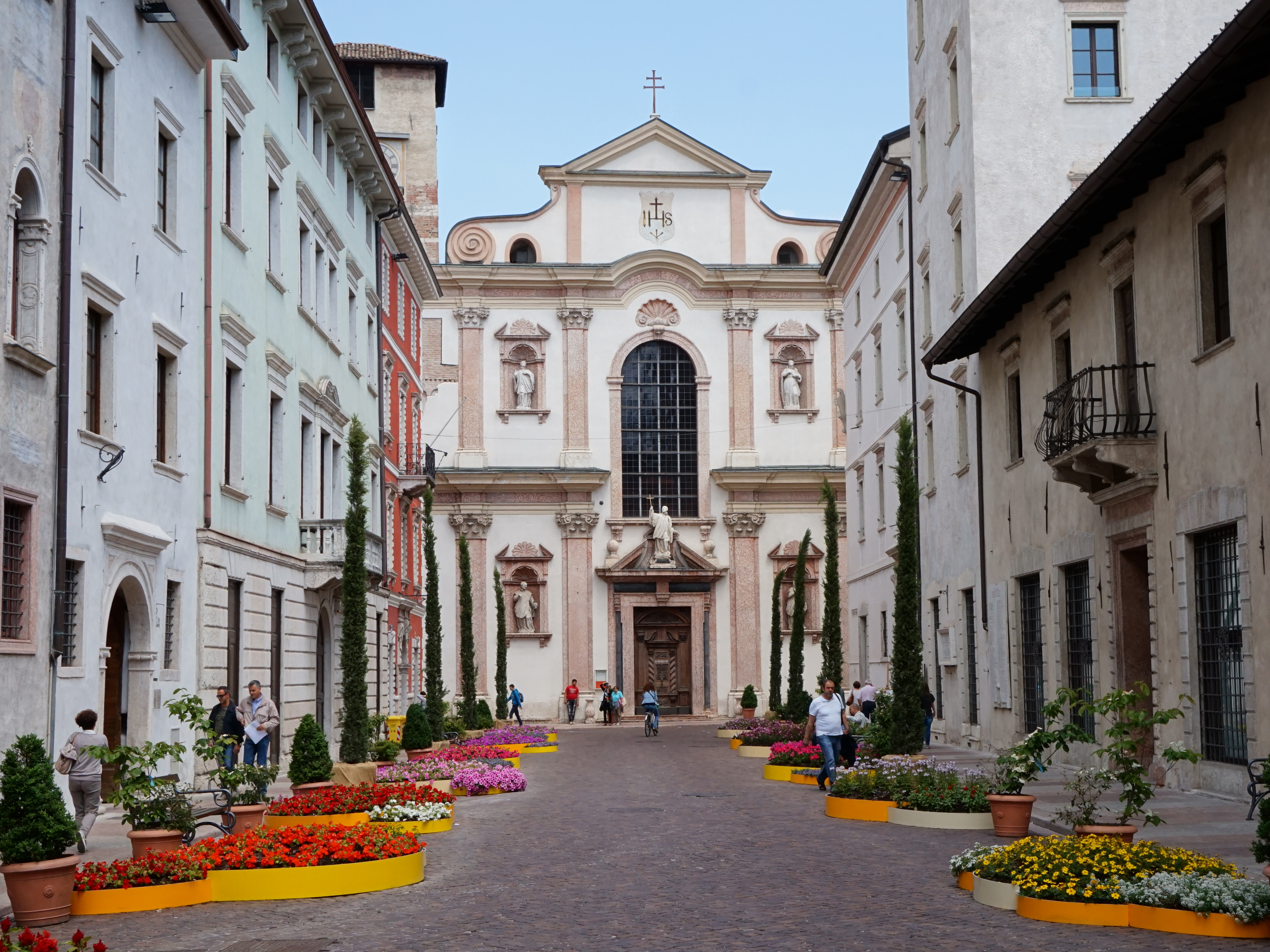
Chiesa di San Francesco Saverio (St. Francis Xavier Church). The street is via Belenzani connecting the church façade with Piazza Duomo

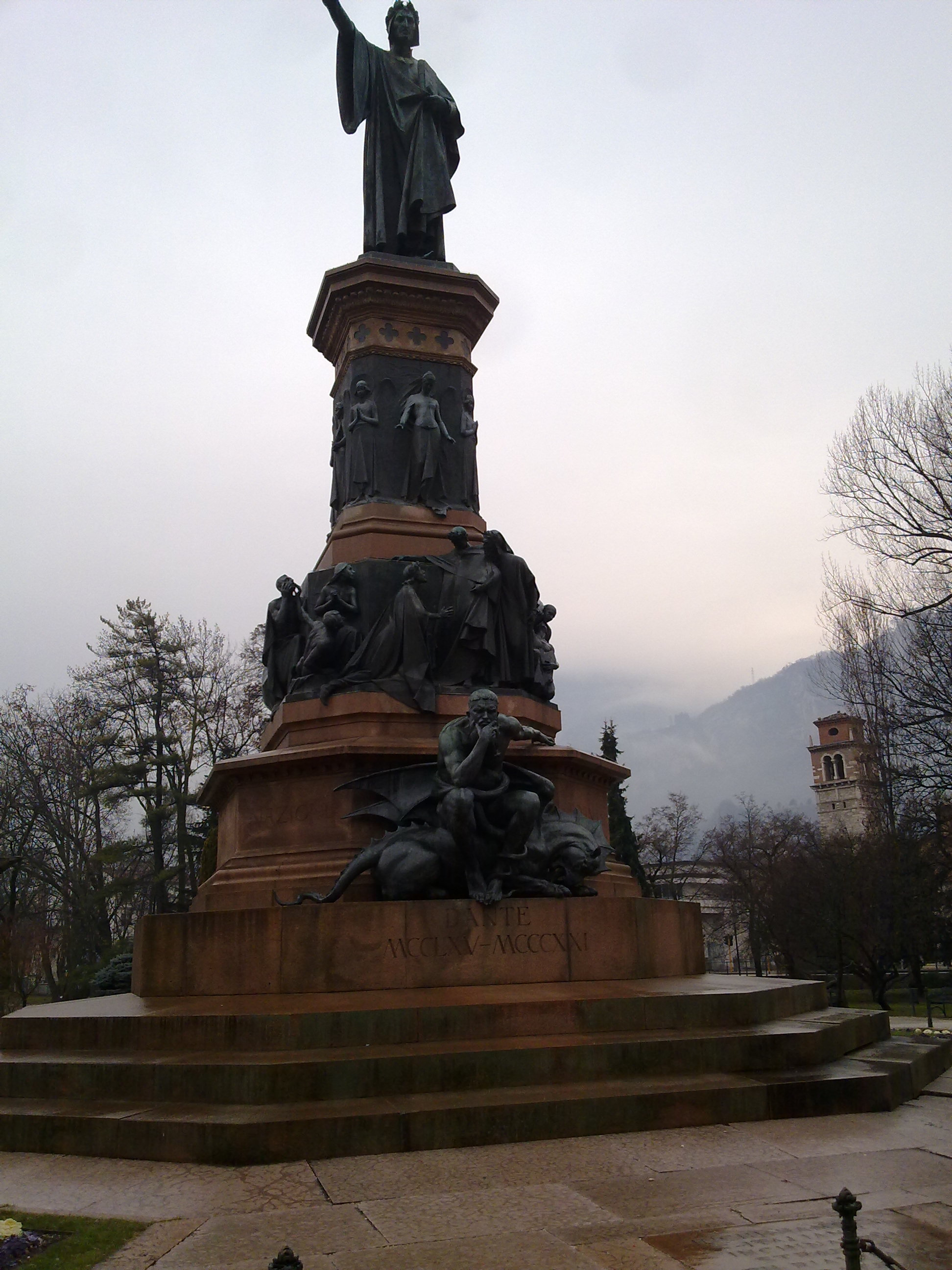
Monument to Dante Alighieri in Piazza Dante

== Culture ==
=== Museums ===
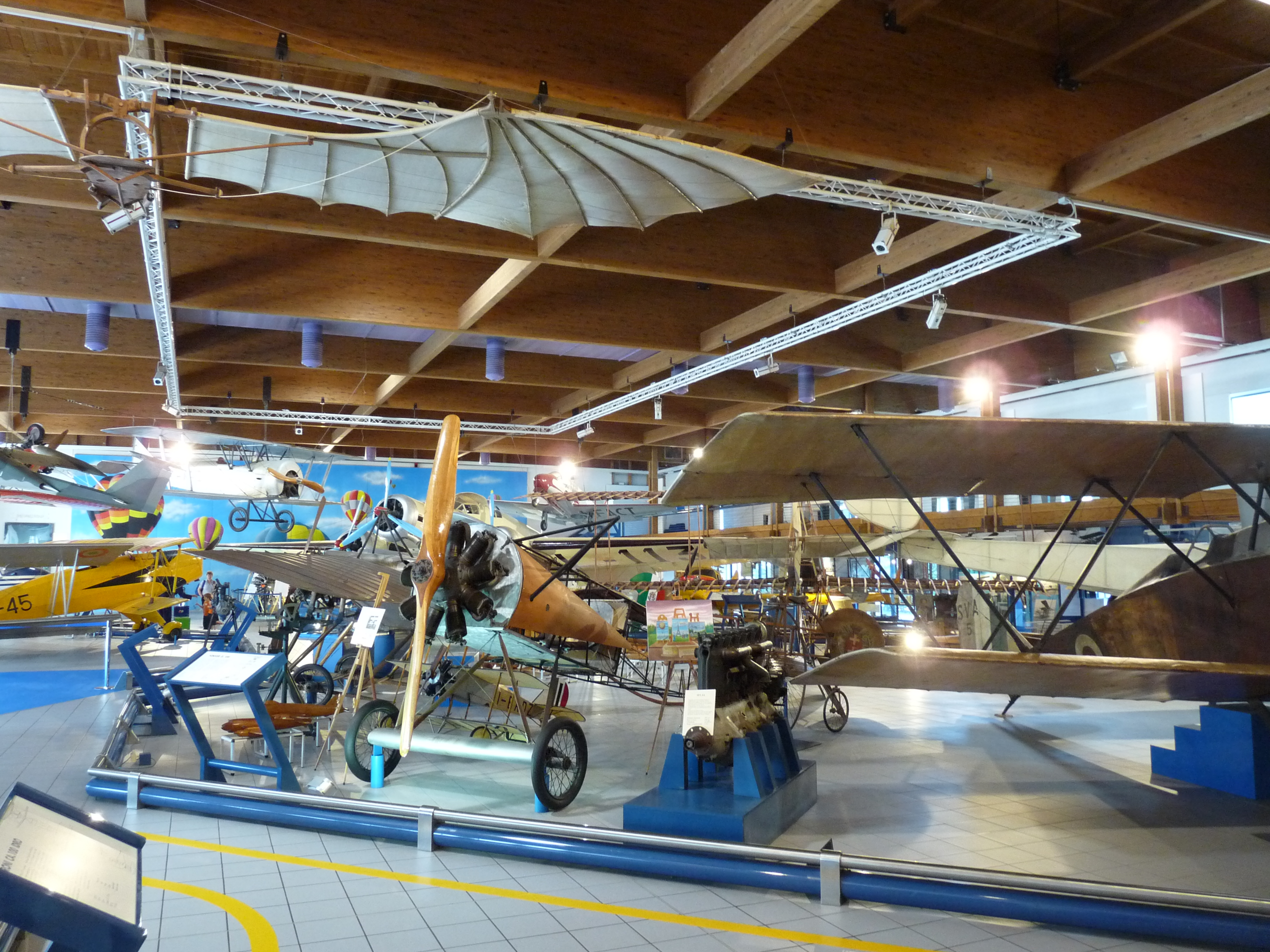
Museo dell'Aeronautica Gianni Caproni

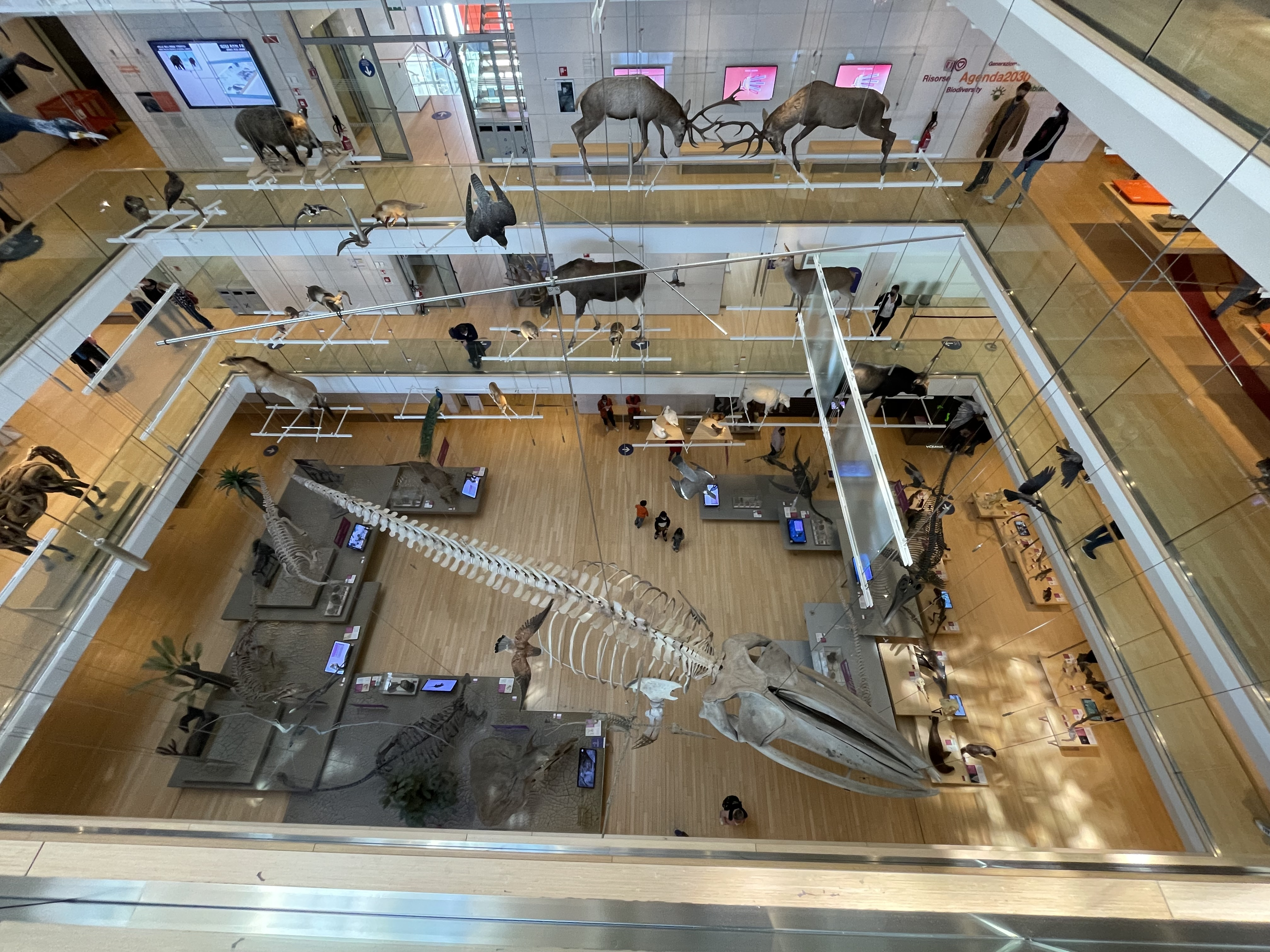
MUSE - Museo delle Scienze

- MUSE - Museo delle Scienze, museum of science and natural history. The museum was planned by Renzo Piano and opened in 2013.
- Municipal Gallery, part of the Museum of Modern and Contemporary Art of Trento and Rovereto (MART).
- Regional Museum of Art, in the Castello del Buonconsiglio, former seat of the Prince-Bishops of Trento.
- The Tridentine Diocesan Museum, located in the Palazzo Pretorio, next to the Cathedral Square of Trento, shows the artistic treasures of the diocese of Trento as well as the influence of the council on the city.
- Viote Alpine Botanical Garden, located on Monte Bondone in Le Viote, founded in 1938. Trento's surroundings are known for the mountain landscapes and are a destination of both summer and winter tourism.
- Museo dell'Aeronautica Gianni Caproni, an aeronautical museum located in Mattarello, near Trento's airport.

=== Theatre ===
- Teatro Sociale, realized in 1819
- Teatro Auditorium
- Teatro San Marco
- Teatro di Meano, located in the frazione of Meano

=== Events ===
- Economy Festival Trento
- Mountain Film Festival
- Christmas Market of Trento
- A Tutto Nosiola – Food and Wine Event
- Gemme di Gusto – Food and Wine Event
- DiVin Ottobre – Food and Wine Event

== Economy ==
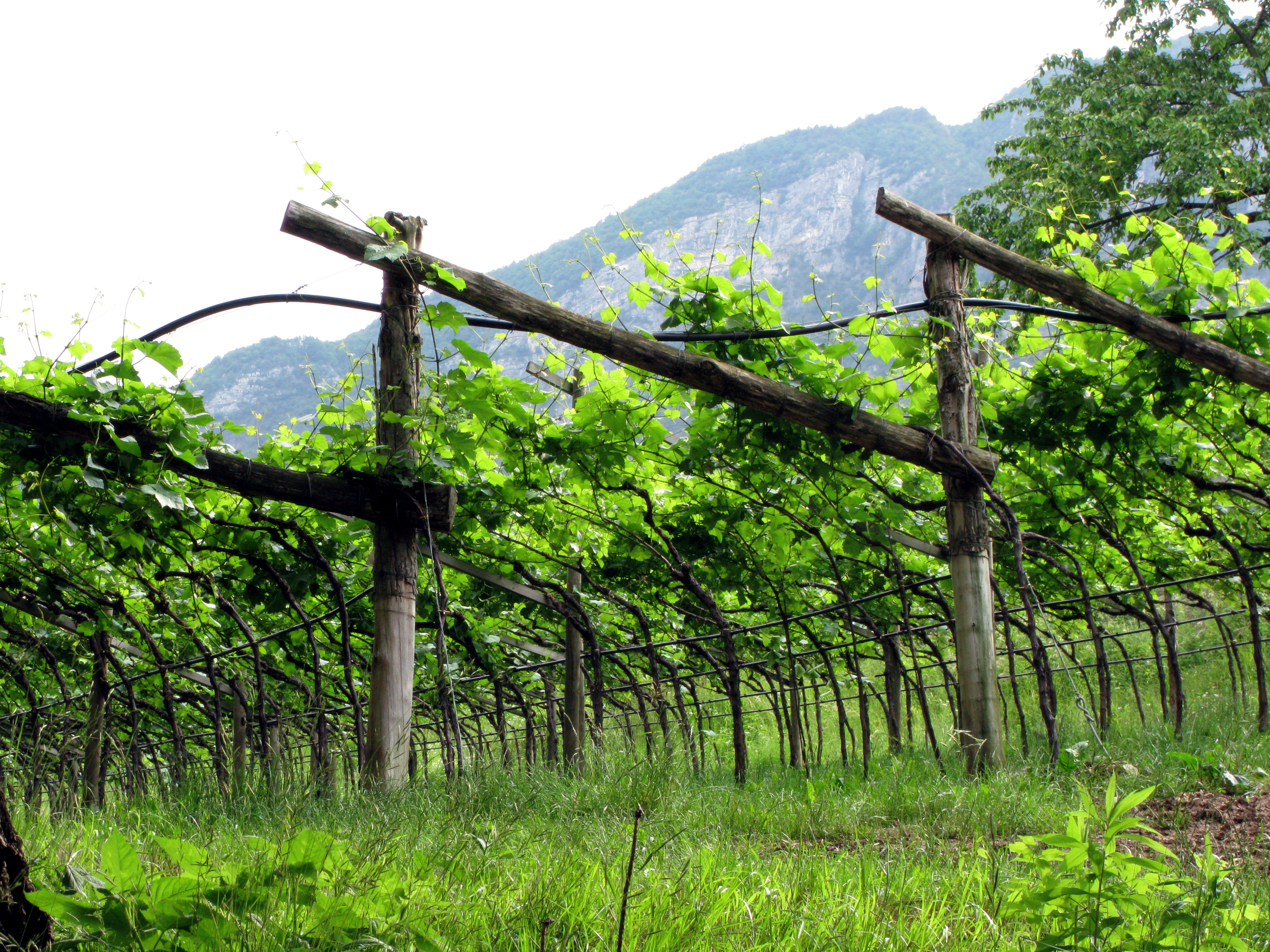
Vineyard in Trento

The city owes much of its unique economy to its position along the main communication route between Italy and Northern Europe and to the Adige river which, prior to its diversion in the mid-19th century, ran through the center of the city. The Adige river was formerly a navigable river and one of the main commercial routes in the Alps. The original course of the river is now covered by the Via Torre Vanga, Via Torre Verde and the Via Alessandro Manzoni.

As late as World War II, Trento depended on wine-making and silk. Sparkling wine made in the Trentino province is part of the Trento DOC classification. The manufacturing industry installed in the post-war period has been mostly dismantled. Today, Trento thrives on commerce, services, tourism, high-quality agriculture and food industry (including wine and fruit), as a research and conference center thanks to a small but renowned university and internationally renowned research centers such as Fondazione Bruno Kessler, active in both fundamental and applied research, the Italian-German Historical Institute, the Centre for Computational and Systems Biology and ECT*, active in theoretical nuclear studies and part of FBK, and as logistics and transportation thoroughfare.

Valued pink and white porphyry are still excavated from some surrounding areas (Pila). This stone can be seen in many of Trento's buildings, both new and old.

The city has two long-running annual sporting events: the Giro al Sas (a 10 km (6 mi) professional road running competition) was first held in the city in 1907 and continues to the present, while the Giro del Trentino is an annual road cycling race which the city has hosted every year since 1963.

=== Economy Festival of Trento ===
The Festival dell’Economia di Trento (Economy Festival of Trento) was brought into being in 2006 in order to enable and facilitate discussions between economists and a broad public. The aim of this festival is to put economic terminology across to everyone. The festival takes place every year at the end of May on the historic Palazzi of the old town in Trento. Well known economists explain and interpret current economic issues, both from an economic-scientific as well as from a social and entrepreneurial viewpoint. In the course of recent years, numerous economic scholars and managers such as Sir Anthony Atkinson, Fan Gang, Zygmunt Bauman and the Nobel Prize winner Gary Becker took an active part.

== Education ==
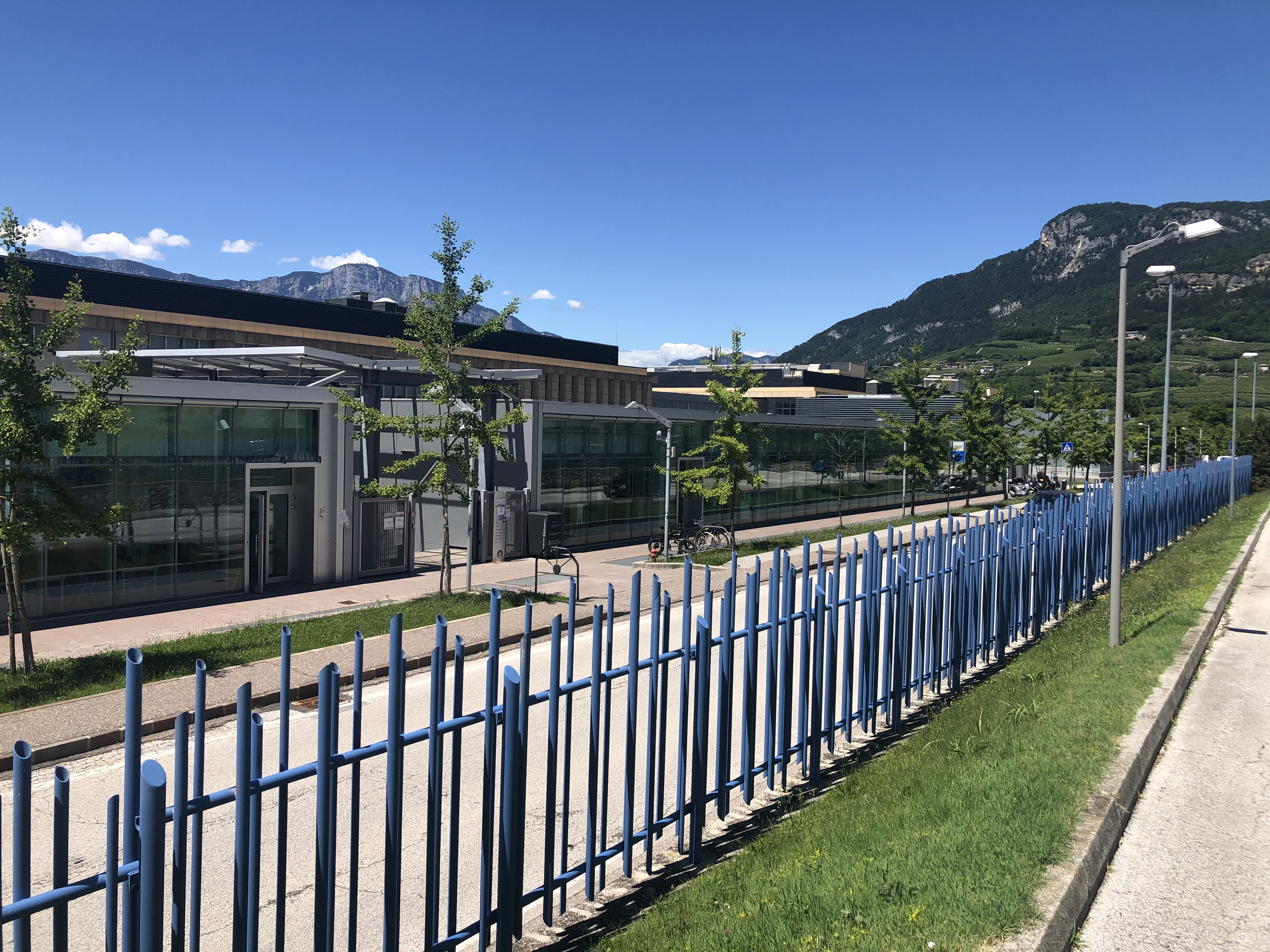
University of Trento, Department of Science

The University of Trento was founded in 1962 and has its headquarters in the city of Trento. The other university location is in Rovereto. In total, over 16,000 students study in Trento. Through the Euroregion Tyrol-South Tyrol-Trentino, the university also works closely together with the universities of Innsbruck and Bolzano.

== Transport ==
The Autostrada A22 (part of the European route E45) highway connects Trento to Verona and to Bolzano, Innsbruck and Munich.

Trento railway station, opened in 1859, forms part of the Brenner railway (Verona–Innsbruck), which is the main rail connection between Italy and Germany. The station is also a junction with the Valsugana railway, which connects Trento to Venice. Trento has several other railway stations, including Trento FTM railway station, terminus of the Trento-Malè-Marilleva railway (FTM).

Bus or train services operate to the main surrounding valleys: Fassa, Fiemme, Gudicarie, Non, Primiero, Rendena, Sole, Tesino, Valsugana.

The public transport network within the city consists of 20 bus lines operated by Trentino Trasporti and a cable car service to Sardagna. The various railway stations within Trento's city limits are integrated into the public transport network.

Trento-Mattarello Airport is an airfield located 8 km (5.0 mi) south of Trento. The nearest passenger airports are Bolzano Airport, located 90 km (56 mi) north, Verona Villafranca Airport, located 95 km (59 mi) south and Venice Marco Polo Airport, located 154 km (96 mi) south east.

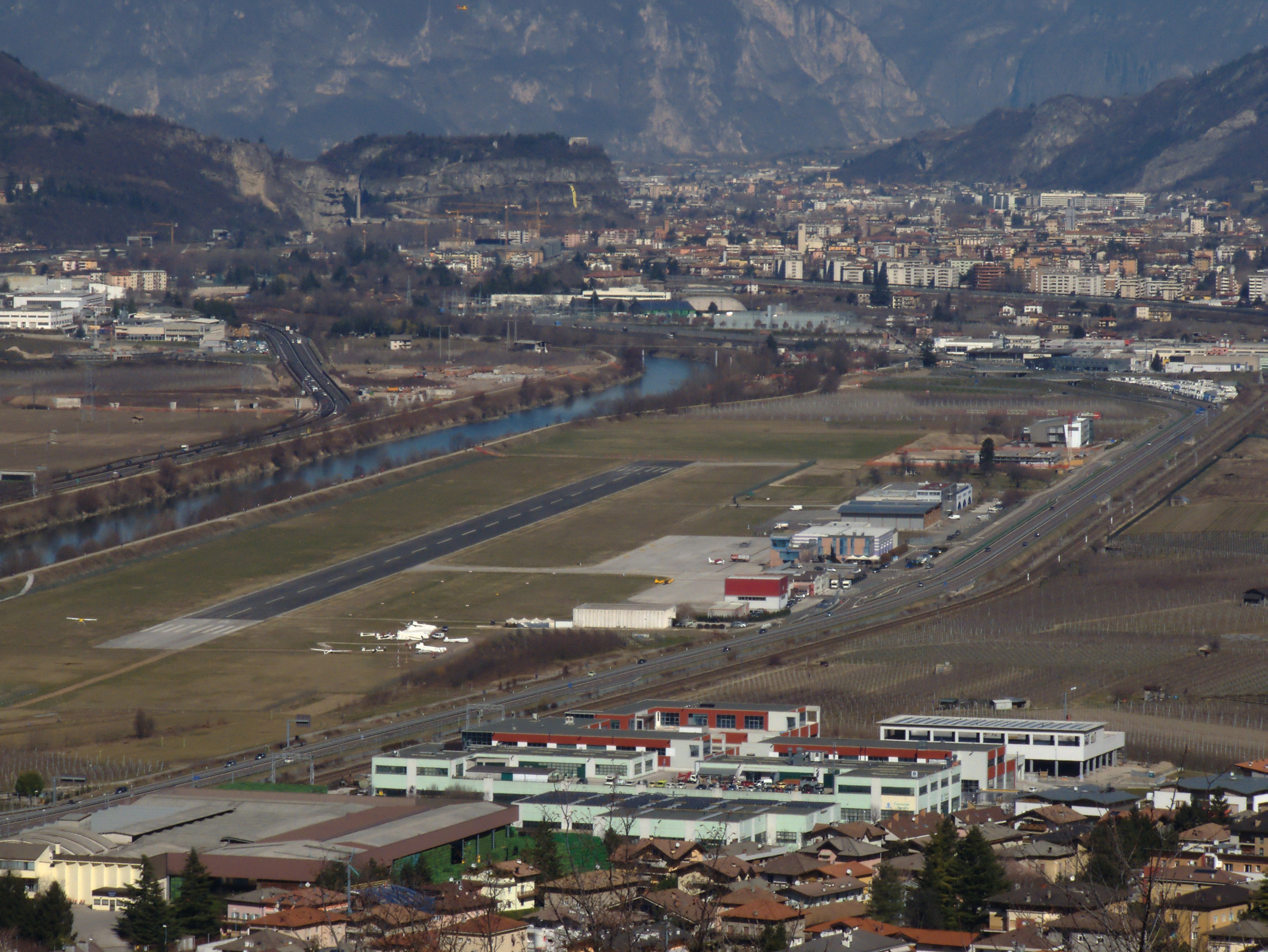
Trento-Mattarello Airport

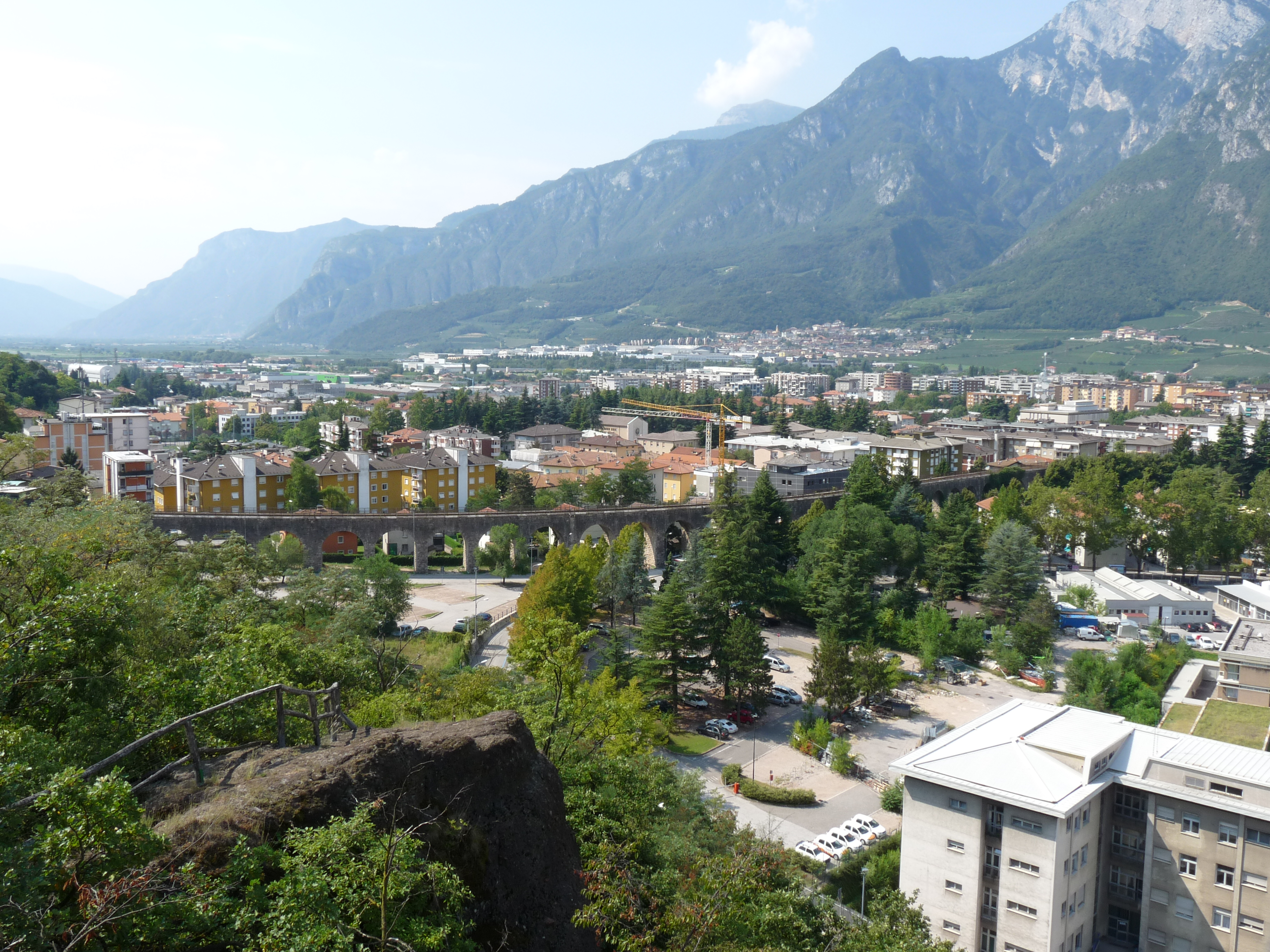
Valsugana railway

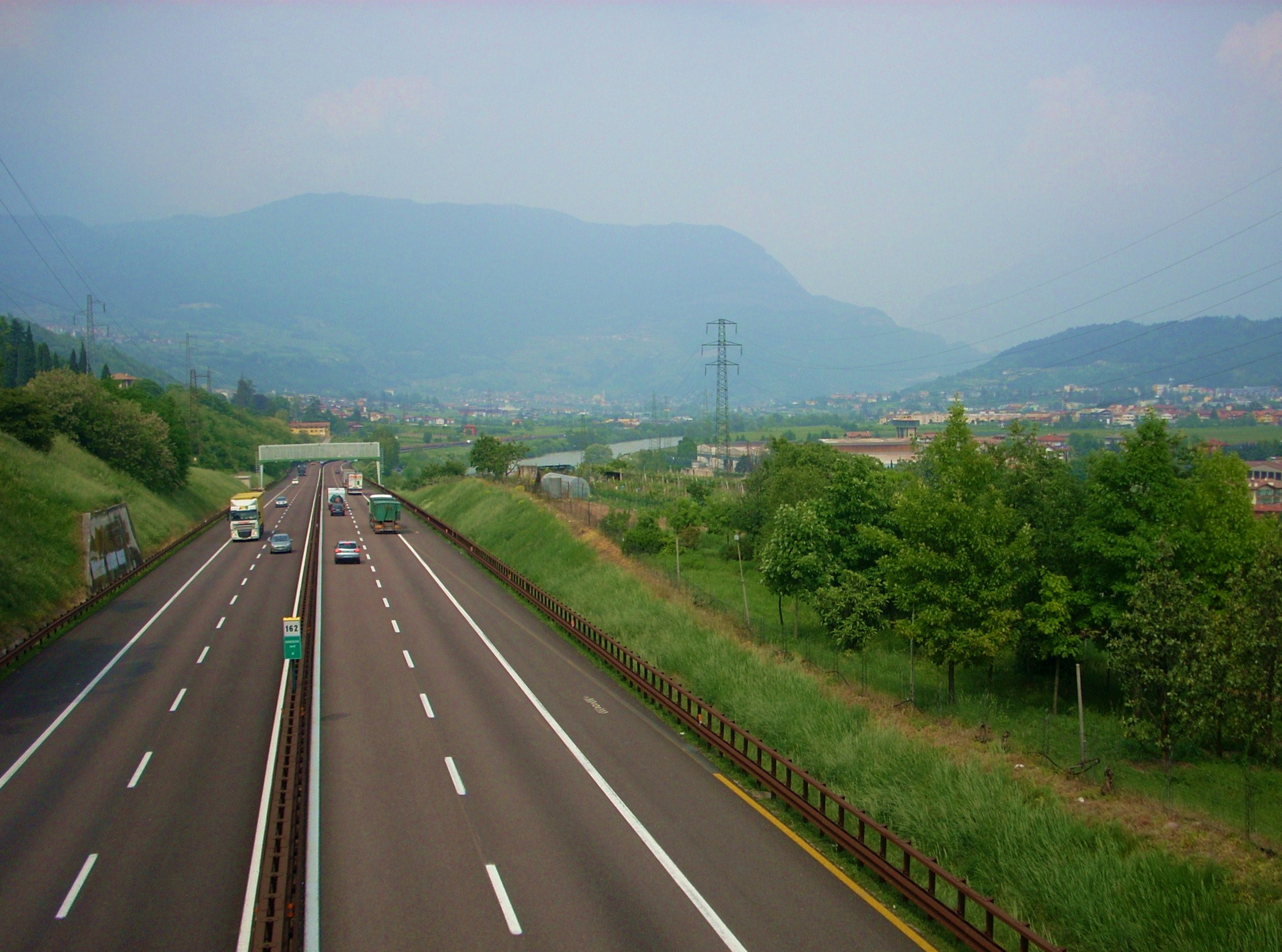
Autostrada A22 (Italy)

== Sport ==
=== Local teams ===
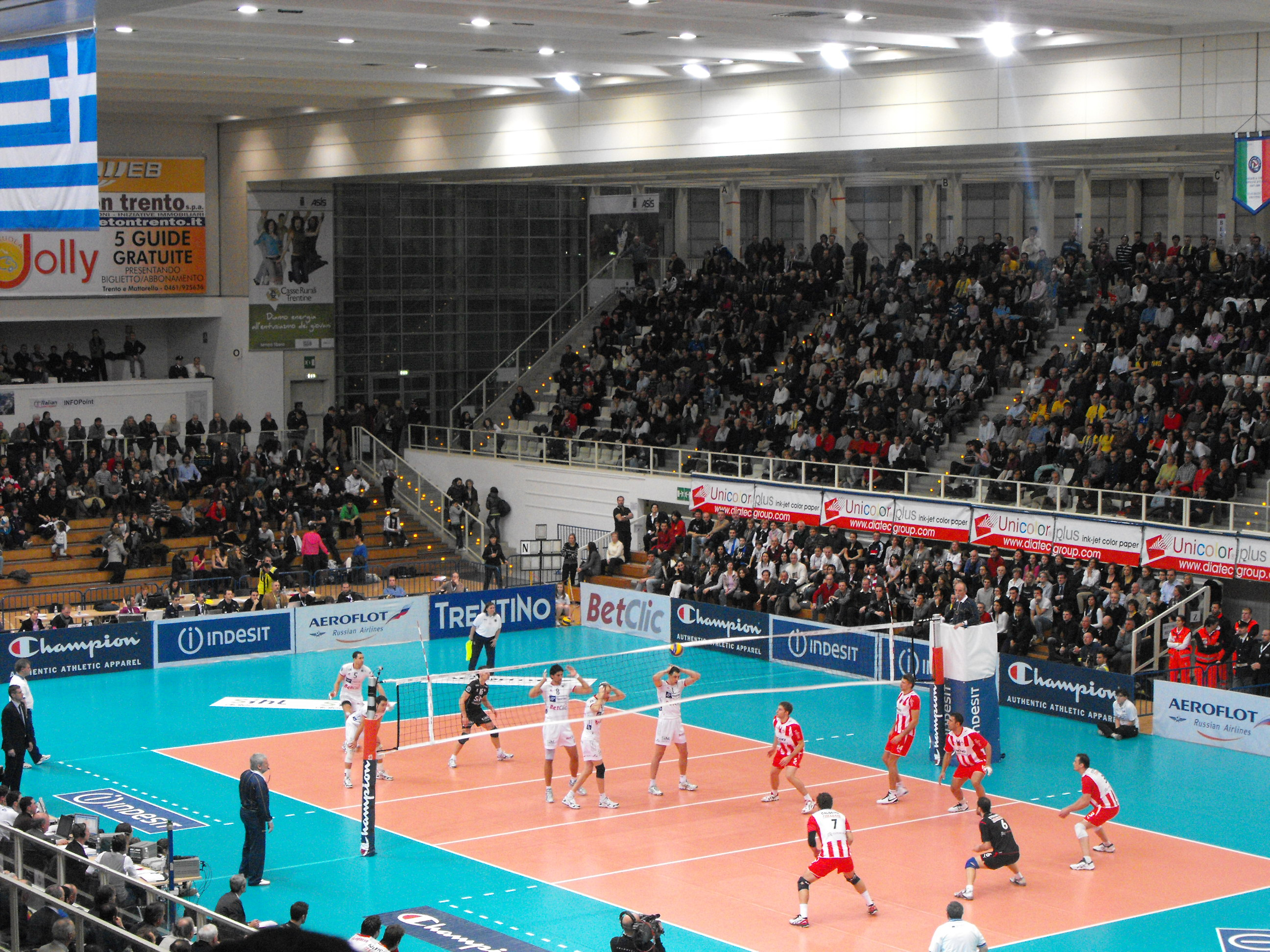
Trentino Volley in PalaTrento

- Trentino Volley, one of the top teams in Italian volleyball, has won the Italian championship four times, three times the CEV Champions League title and five times the club world cup.
- Aquila Basket Trento has been playing regularly in the highest Italian basketball league for several years and reached the final of the play-offs in the 2016/17 season and 2017/18 season.
- A.C. Trento S.C.S.D. is one of the oldest football clubs in the region of Trentino Alto Adige since its foundation in 1921. Starting in 2021, the club is to play in the third highest Italian league, the Serie C.

=== Sports venues ===
PalaTrento, now known as BLM Group Arena, opened in 2000, is an indoor arena with a capacity of 4300 seats. Trentino Volley and Aquila Basket Trento play their respective games there.

- Stadio Briamasco is a football stadium with a capacity of 4277 seats and is currently the home stadium of AC Trento.

== Notable people ==
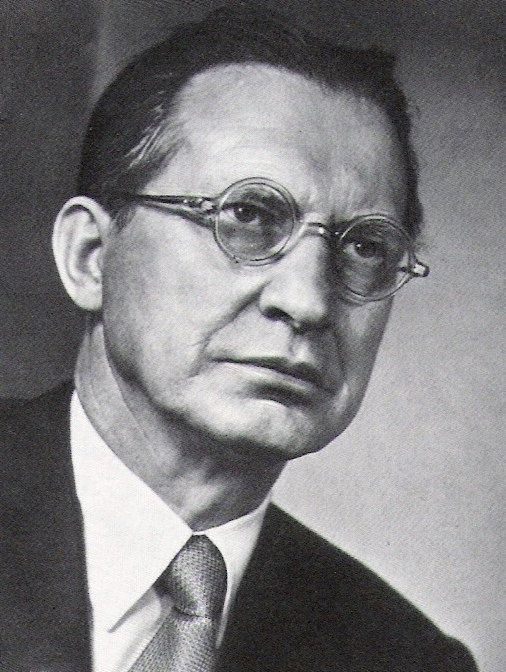
Alcide De Gasperi

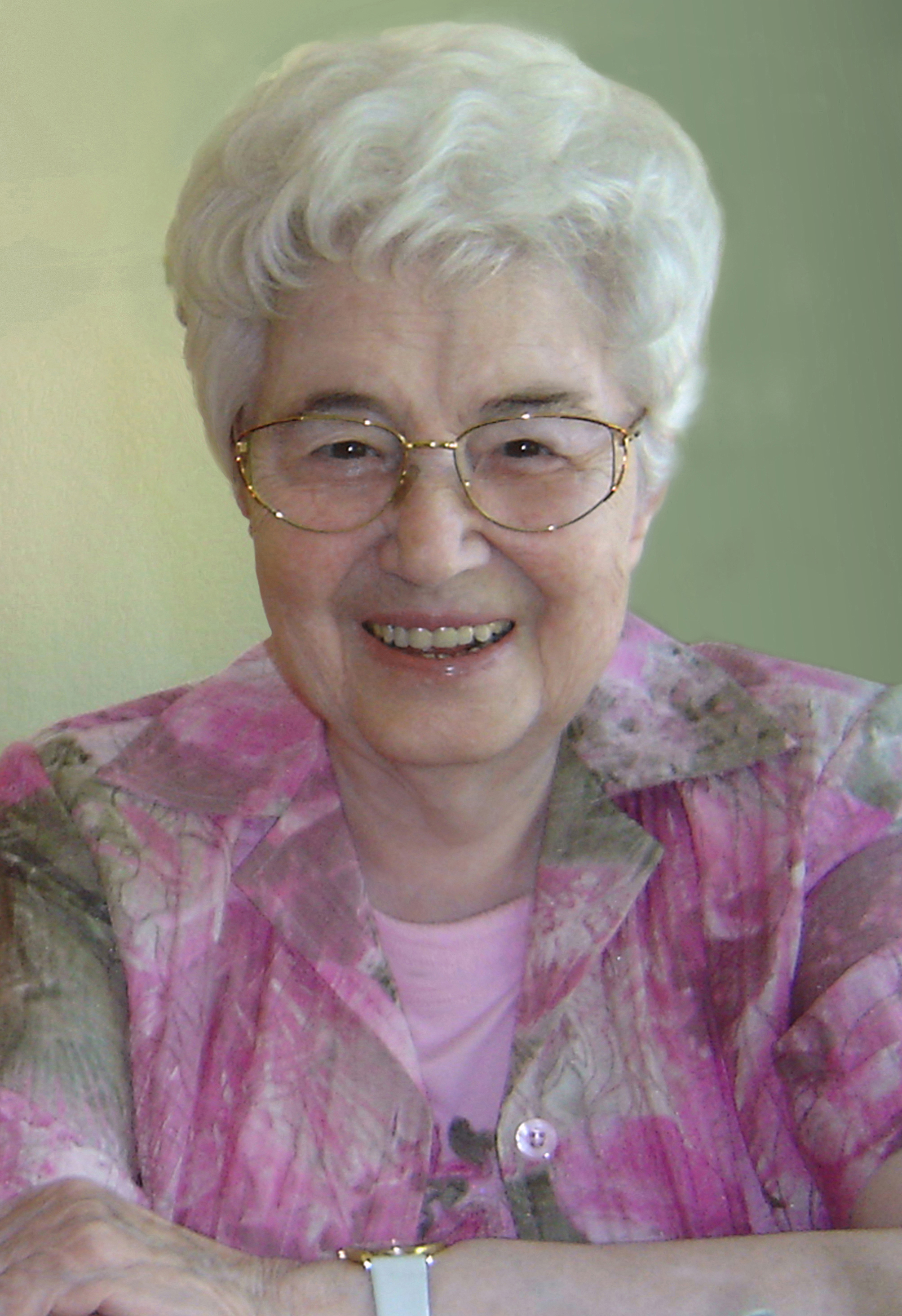
Chiara Lubich, 2006

Notable people born in or associated with Trento include:

- Jacopo Aconcio (c. 1520–1566), Italian jurist, theologian, philosopher and engineer
- Beniamino Andreatta (1928–2007), Italian economist and politician
- Cesare Battisti (1875–1916), Italian patriot during the Italian irredentism
- Francesco Antonio Bonporti (1672–1749), Italian priest and amateur composer
- Aliprando Caprioli, engraver of the 16th century
- Alcide De Gasperi (1881–1954), 30th Prime Minister of Italy and one of the founding fathers of the European Union
- Ernest von Koerber (1850–1919), Austrian liberal statesman, prime minister of the Austrian portion of Austria-Hungary from 1900 to 1904
- Johann Baptist von Lampi the Younger (1775–1837), Austrian portrait painter
- Chiara Lubich (1920–2008), Italian teacher and author. She founded the Focolare Movement.
- Martino Martini (1614–1661), Jesuit missionary, geographer, historian and missionary
- Paolo Oss Mazzurana (1833–1895), Trento's most notable mayor, with progressive economic policies that impacted Trento's commercial sector and its eventual independence
- Francesca Neri (born 1964), Italian actress
- Aldo Pancheri (born 1940), painter and printmaker
- Antonio Pedrotti (1901–1975), Italian conductor and composer
- Alfredo Pieroni (1923–2011), Journalist and essayist
- Andrea Pozzo (1642–1709), Jesuit Brother, baroque painter and architect
- Galeas von Thun und Hohenstein (1850–1931), the Prince and Grand Master of the Sovereign Military Order of Malta from 1905 to 1931
- Alessandro Vittoria (1525–1608), Italian Mannerist sculptor of the Venetian school
- Hermann Zingerle (1870–1935), Austrian neurologist, psychiatrist and neuropathologist

=== Sport ===
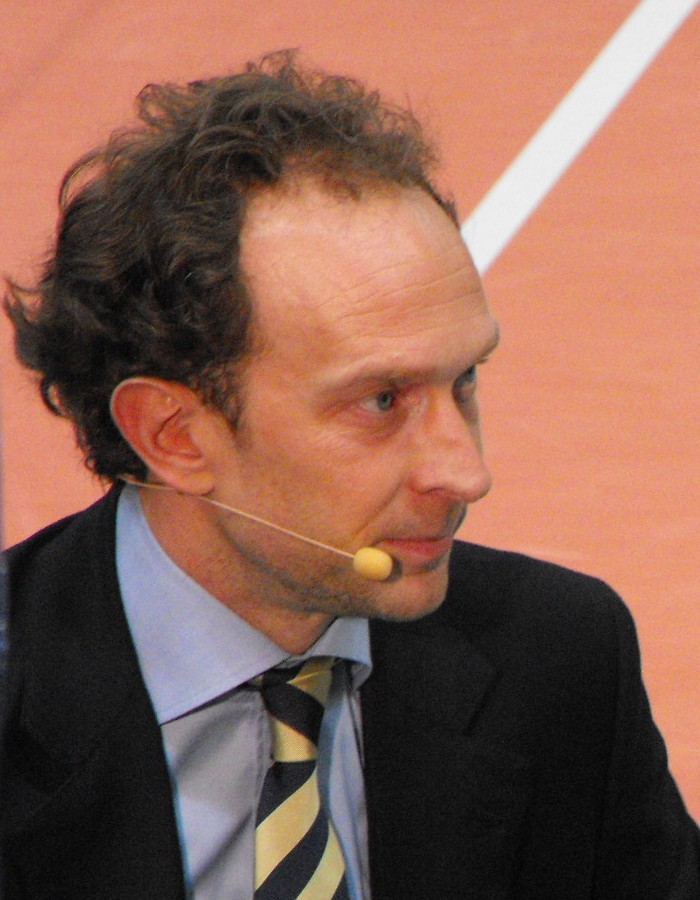
Lorenzo Bernardi, 2009

- Lorenzo Bernardi (born 1968), Italian volleyball coach and former player, team silver medallist at the 1996 Summer Olympics
- Attilio Bettega (1953–1985), rally driver
- Alessandro Bonetti (born 1985), racing driver
- Mirko Bortolotti (born 1990), racing driver
- Thomas Degasperi (born 1981), water skier, two time World Champion
- Cesare Maestri (1929–2021), Italian mountaineer and writer
- Amos Mosaner (born 1995), Italian curler, team gold medallist at the 2022 Winter Olympics
- Marvin Vettori (born 1993), Italian professional mixed martial artist
- Renzo Videsott (1904–1974), Italian alpinist and conservationist

== International relations ==
=== Twin towns – sister cities ===
Trento is twinned with:

- Charlottenburg-Wilmersdorf (Berlin), Germany (1966)
- San Sebastián, Spain (1987)
- Kempten, Germany (1987)
- Prague 1, Czech Republic (2002)

Districts of Trento are twinned with:

- Schwaz, Austria
- Fließ, Austria
- Ergolding, Germany
- Herrsching, Germany
- Neufahrn bei Freising, Germany
- Znojmo, Czech Republic
- Taksony, Hungary

=== Partner cities ===
- Prijedor, Bosnia and Herzegovina
- Sławno, Poland

== See also ==
- Trentino
- Val d'Adige (territory)
