= Viote Alpine Botanical Garden =

Botanical garden in Trento, Italy

Coordinates: 45°59′17″N 11°01′51″E

- Giardino Botanico Alpino Viote
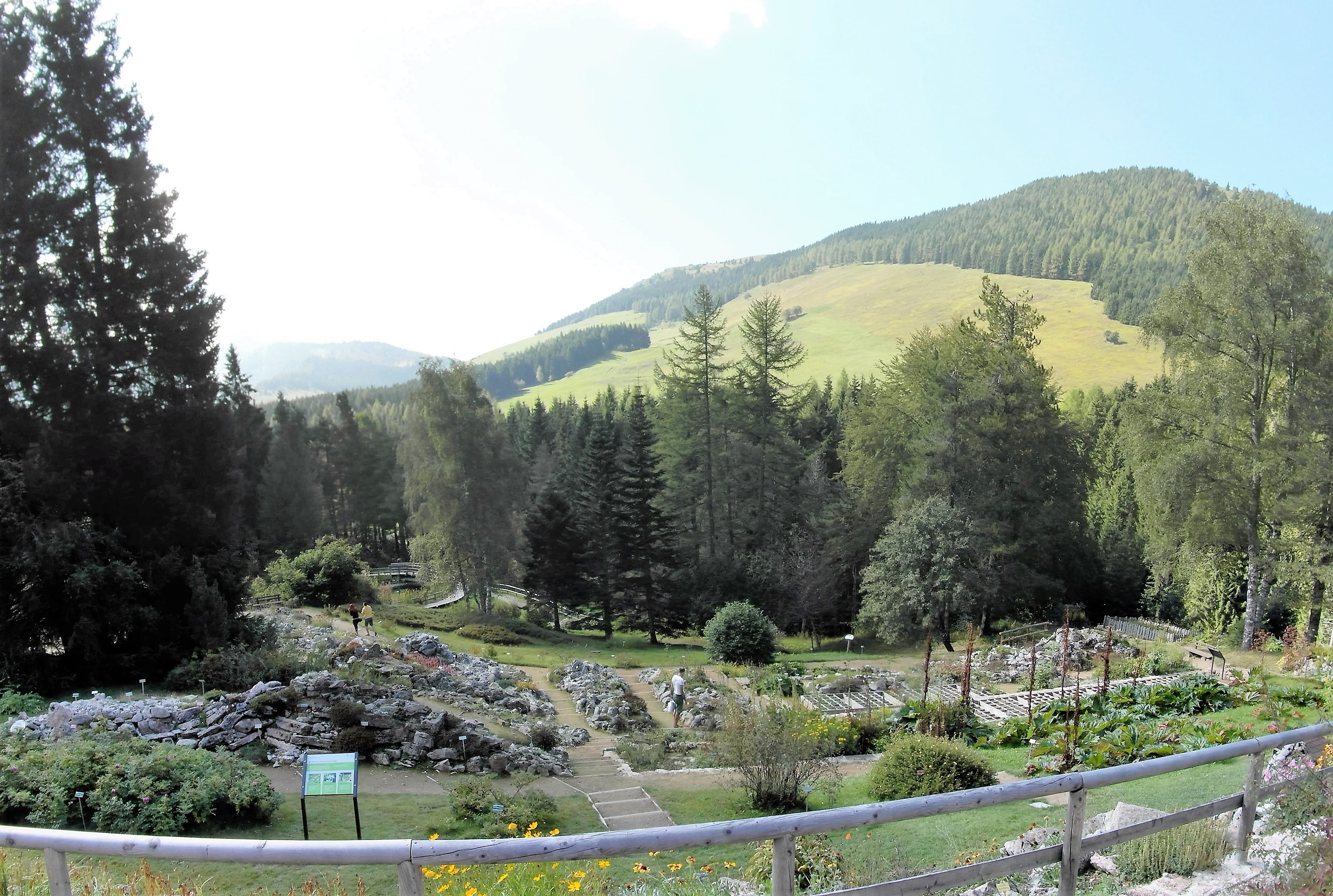
- Established: 1938
- Location: Monte Bondone, Trento, Italy
- Type: Botanical garden
- Founder: Vittorio Marchesoni
- Website: www2.muse.it/Viote_giardino_botanico

The Viote Alpine Botanical Garden (Giardino Botanico Alpino Viote) (10 hectares) is an alpine botanical garden operated by the Museo tridentino di scienze naturali, and located in Viotte di Monte Bondone, southwest of Trento, Trentino-Alto Adige/Südtirol, Italy. It is open daily in the warmer months; an admission fee is charged.

The garden was established in 1938, damaged in World War II, and renewed in 1958. Plants are grouped in beds by areas of origin, such as the Pyrenees, the Alps, the Apennines, the Balkans, Carpathians, Caucasus, the Americas, and the Himalayas. American genera include Arnica, Eriophyllum, Lewisia, Liatris, Phlox, Penstemon, and Silphium; Himalayan genera include Androsace, Gentiana, Incarvillea, Leontopodium, Meconopsis, Potentilla, and Veronica.

Species of particular interest include Artemisia petrosa, Daphne petraea, Ephedra helvetica, Fritillaria tubaeformis, Linaria tonzigi, Paederota bonarota, Rhizobotrya alpina, Sanguisorba dodecandra, Saxifraga arachnoidea, Saxifraga tombeanensis, Scabiosa vestina, Silene elisabethae, and Viola dubyana. The garden also includes a nature trail (1000 meters) through indigenous vegetation, including Drosera rotundifolia and Pinguicula vulgaris.

== See also ==
- List of botanical gardens in Italy
