= Museo delle Scienze =

Science museum in Trento, Italy

Coordinates: 46.0626°N 11.1147°E

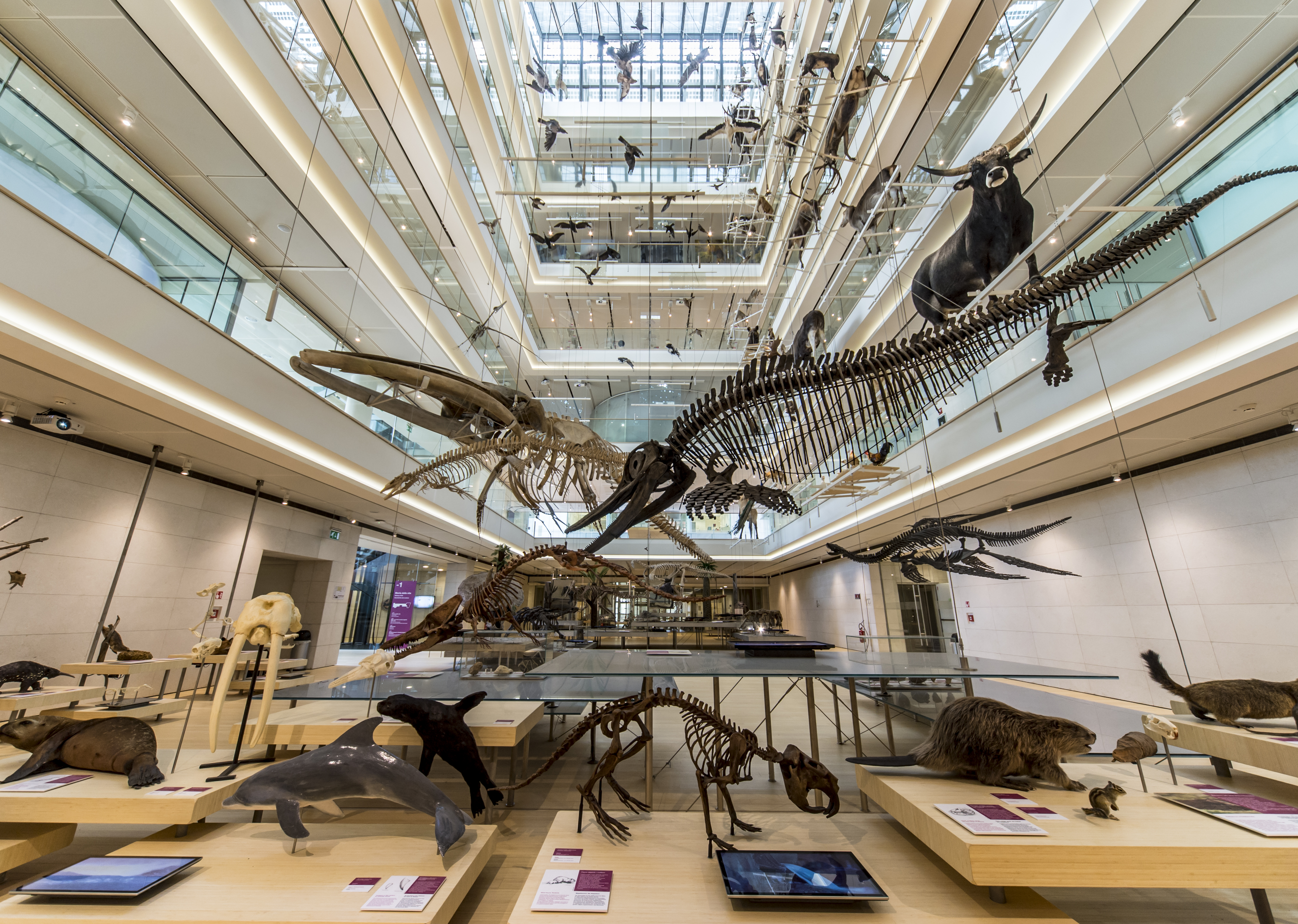
Interior of MUSE - Science Museum in Trento. Level -1 and big void.

The Museo delle Scienze (MUSE) is a science museum in Trento, Italy. The museum was designed by architect Renzo Piano and opened in 2013.
