= Madruzzo =

Madruzzo may refer to:

== People with the surname ==
- Carlo Emanuele Madruzzo
- Carlo Gaudenzio Madruzzo
- Cristoforo Madruzzo
- Eriprando Madruzzo
- Ludovico Madruzzo

== Places ==
- Madruzzo, Trentino
