= Portrait of Cardinal Cristoforo Madruzzo =

Painting by Titian

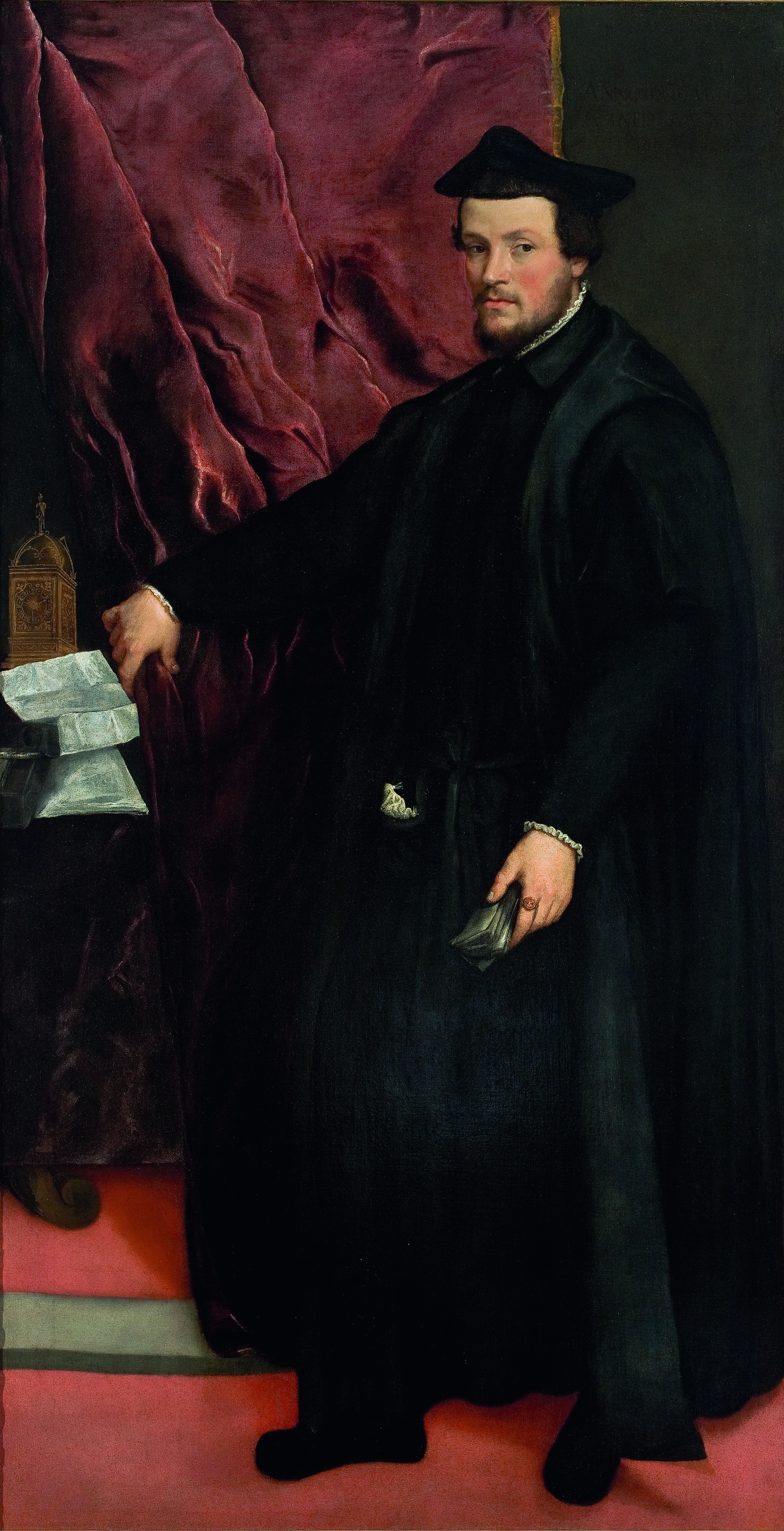
- Artist: Titian
- Year: 1552
- Medium: Oil on canvas
- Dimensions: 210 cm × 109 cm (83 in × 43 in)
- Location: São Paulo Museum of Art, São Paulo
- Accession: MASP.00020

Portrait of Cardinal Cristoforo Madruzzo is an oil painting by Titian, signed and dated 1552, which hangs in the São Paulo Museum of Art.

== Description ==
The youthful prelate, Cristoforo Madruzzo, Prince Bishop of Trent, and afterwards cardinal, is dressed entirely in black silk, and turns half round to the front as he walks, while he lifts with his hand a red curtain, behind which is seen his writing-table covered with a green cloth.

== Analysis ==
This is one of the few examples of a full-length portrait by Titian's hand. Giovanni Morelli and Charles Ricketts attributed it erroneously to Moroni. The picture affected Ricketts (in reproduction: he had not seen the original) as a late picture by Moroni; he thought it gauche in painting (noting the "clumsy short thumbs") and design. This was also the impression of Morelli, basing his opinion upon a photograph.

Giorgio Vasari mentions this portrait just after that of the Ambassador Mendozza, done in 1541; and according to Georg Gronau his indication is confirmed by a letter dated July 1642, in which the portrait is mentioned as finished. Gronau therefore thought it was produced in the first months of the year 1542. An article in the Gazette des Beaux-Arts corrected the date to 1552. The work is signed and dated, "1.5.5.2. / TITIAN FECIT".

== Provenance ==
Formerly in the Castle of Trent, it remained in the Madruzzo family, and passing through various hands, it came in 1836 to the Salvadori and the collection of Barone Valentino de Salvadori. By 1910 it was in the collection of James Stillman in the United States. The picture passed through many hands, and was acquired by the São Paulo Museum of Art in 1951.

== Gallery ==
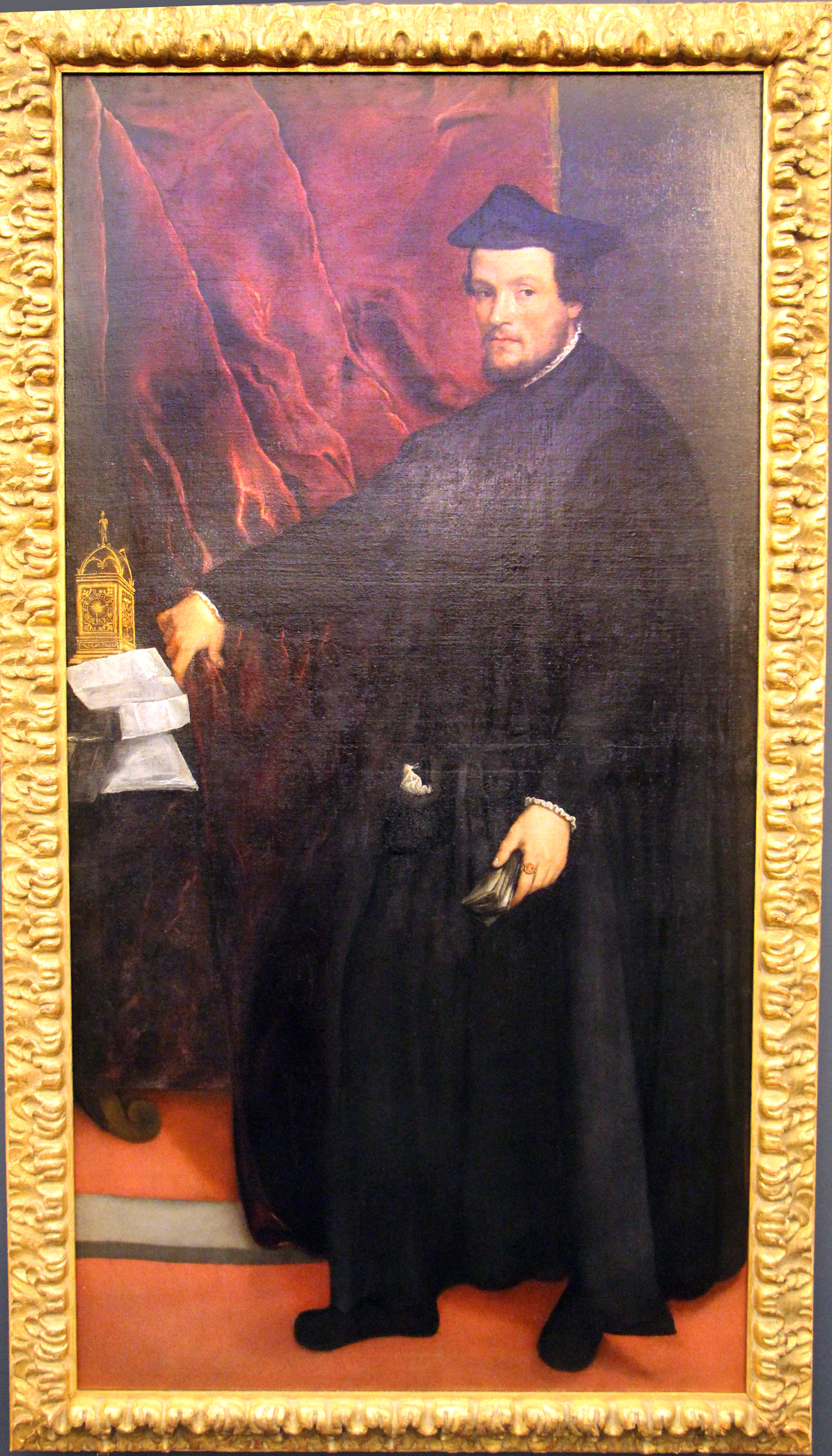
The painting in its frame

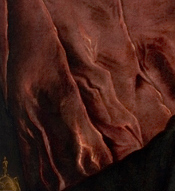
Drapery (detail)

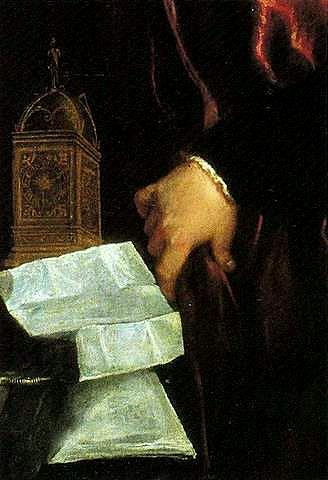
Right hand (detail)

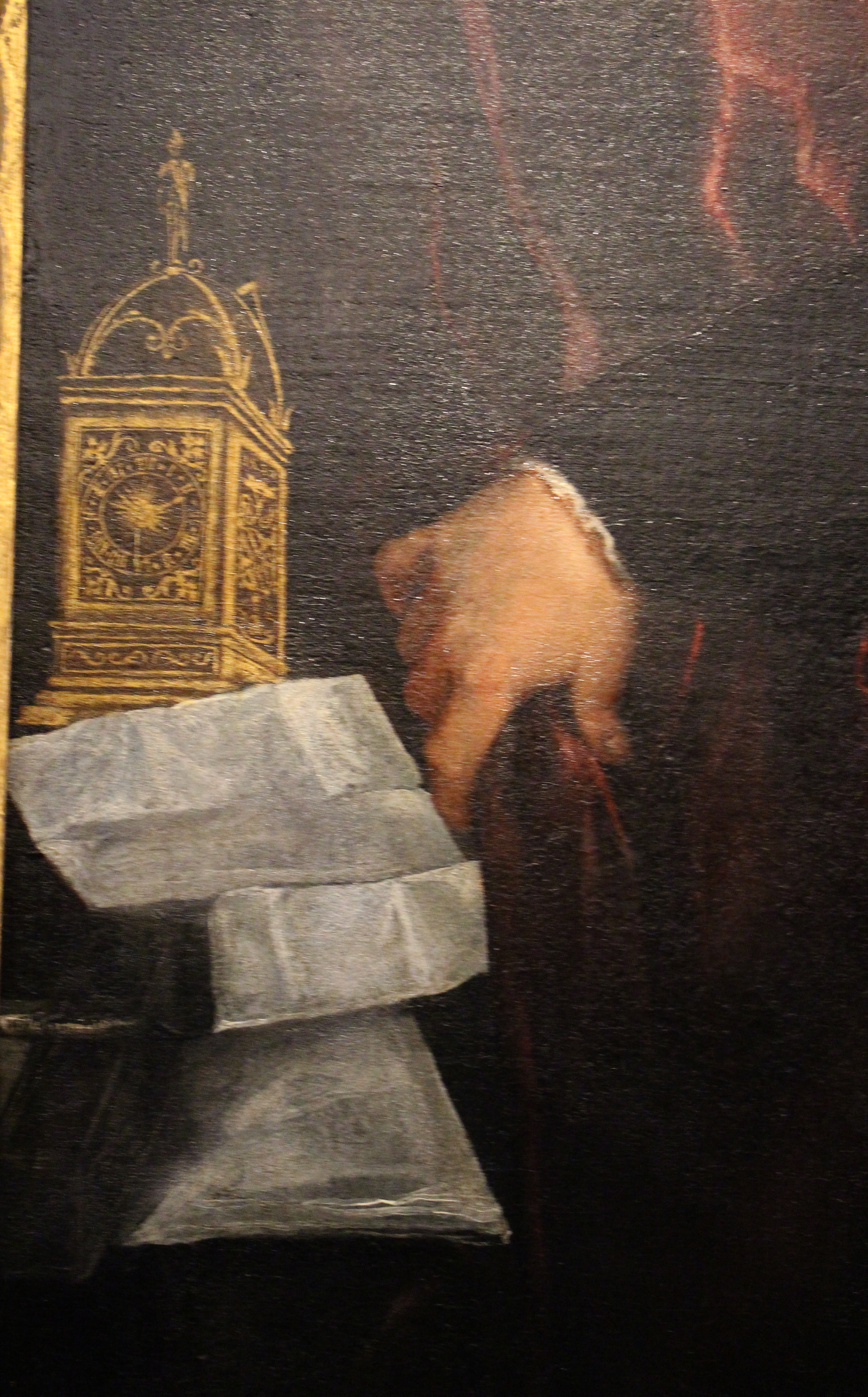
Right hand (detail)

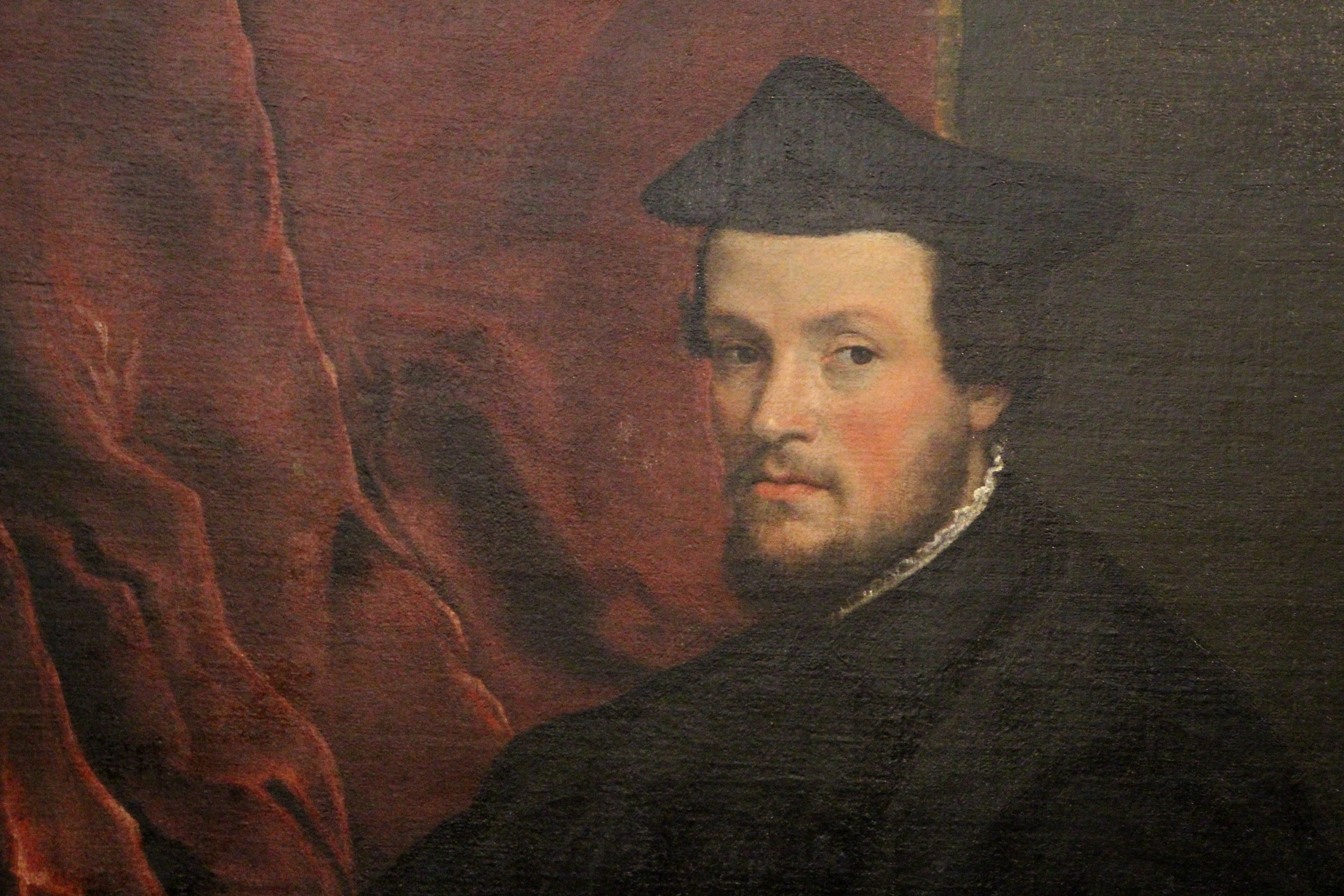
Head and shoulders (detail)

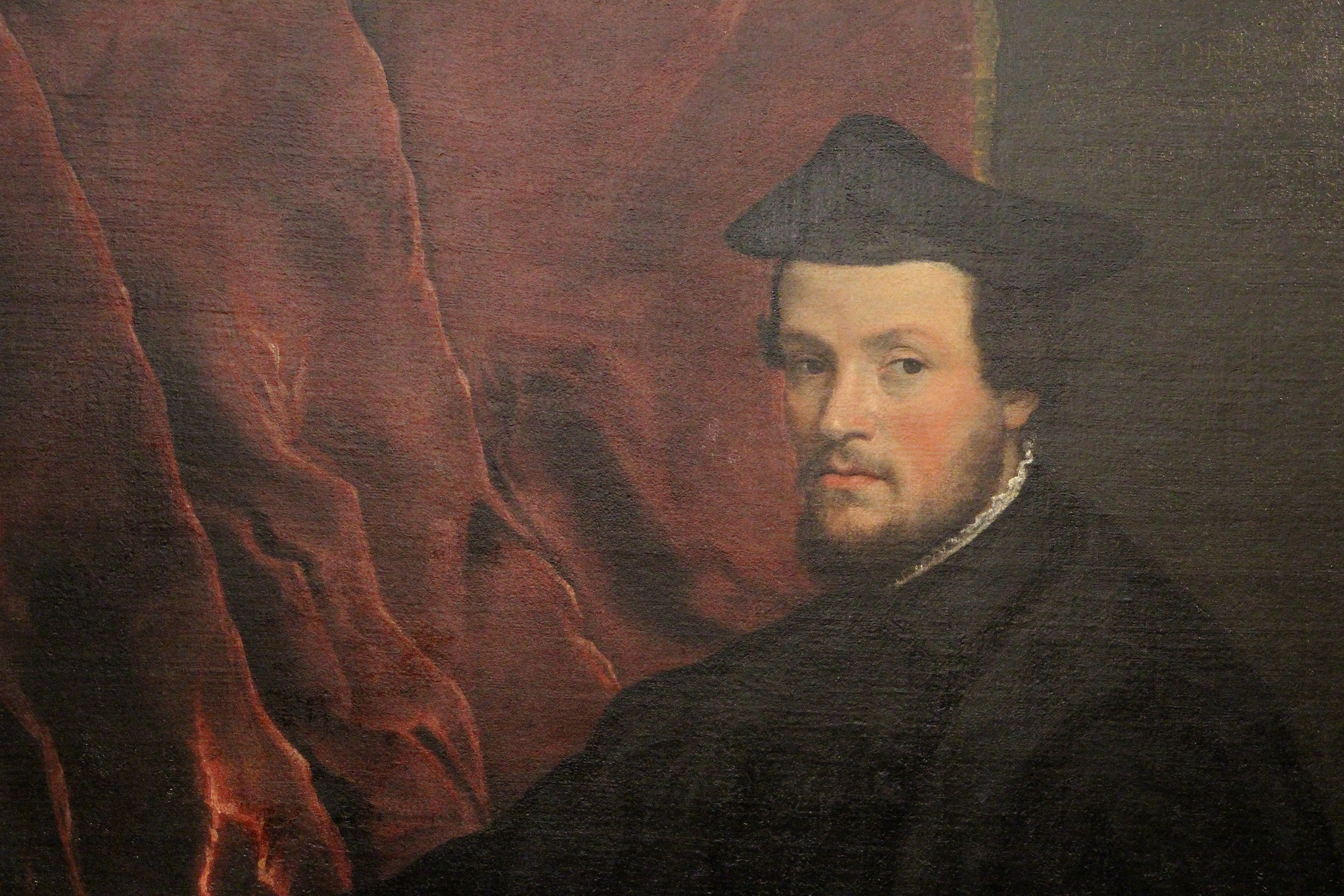
Head and shoulders (detail)

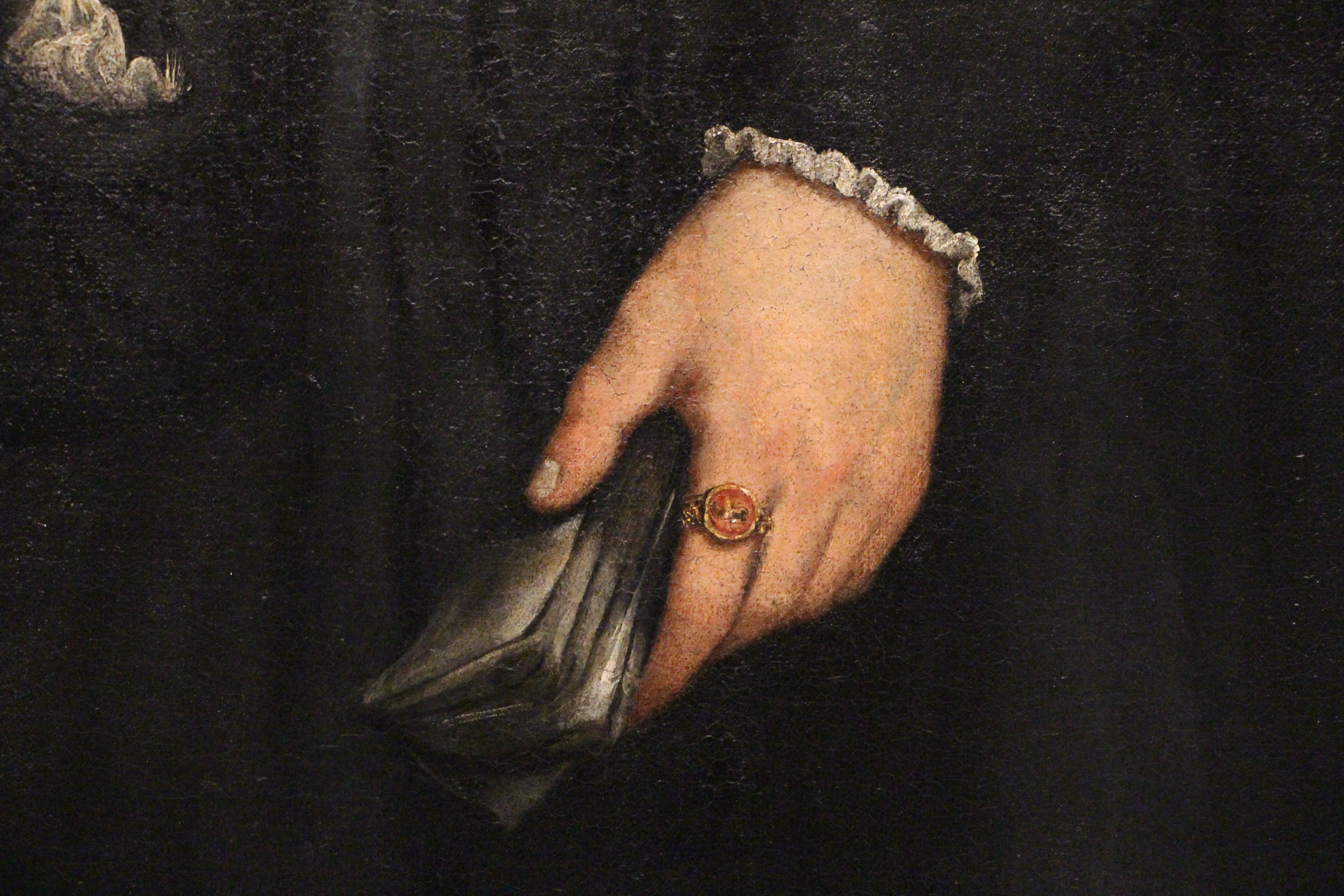
Left hand (detail)

== Sources ==
- Gronau, Georg (1904). Titian. London: Duckworth and Co; New York: Charles Scribner's Sons. pp. 128, 269, 275.
- Ricketts, Charles (1910). Titian. London: Methuen & Co. Ltd. p. 100.
- "Retrato do cardeal Cristoforo Madruzzo, 1552". MASP. Retrieved 23 November 2022.
