= Santa Maria Maggiore, Trento =

Church building in Italy

Basilica of Santa Maria Maggiore
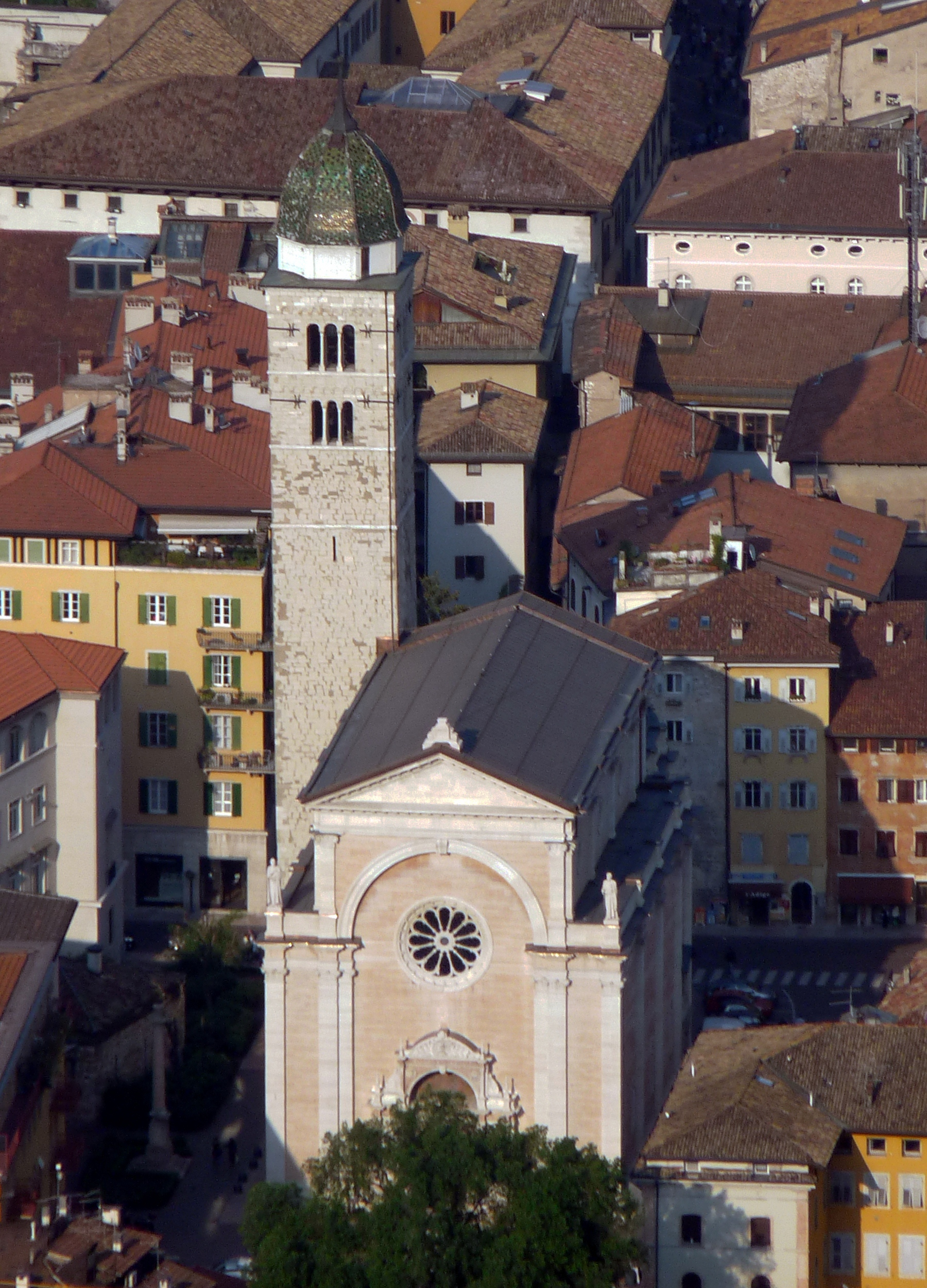
- Basilica of Santa Maria Maggiore
- 46.0686°N 11.1194°E
- Country: Italy
- Denomination: Roman Catholic
- Tradition: Latin Church
- Website: Santa Maria Maggiore

History
- Dedication: Blessed Virgin Mary

Architecture
- Architect: Antonio Medaglia
- Architectural type: Basilica
- Style: Renaissance, Baroque
- Groundbreaking: 1520
- Completed: 1524

Administration
- Archdiocese: Trento

The Church of Santa Maria Maggiore is an important place of worship in the city of Trento, and the site of the Third Session of the Council of Trent. It was built by Antonio Medaglia on the model of the basilica of Sant'Andrea in Mantua, at the wish of the Prince-Archbishop Bernardo Clesio. In November 1973 Pope Paul VI accorded it the status of minor cathedral.

== Founding, development and history ==
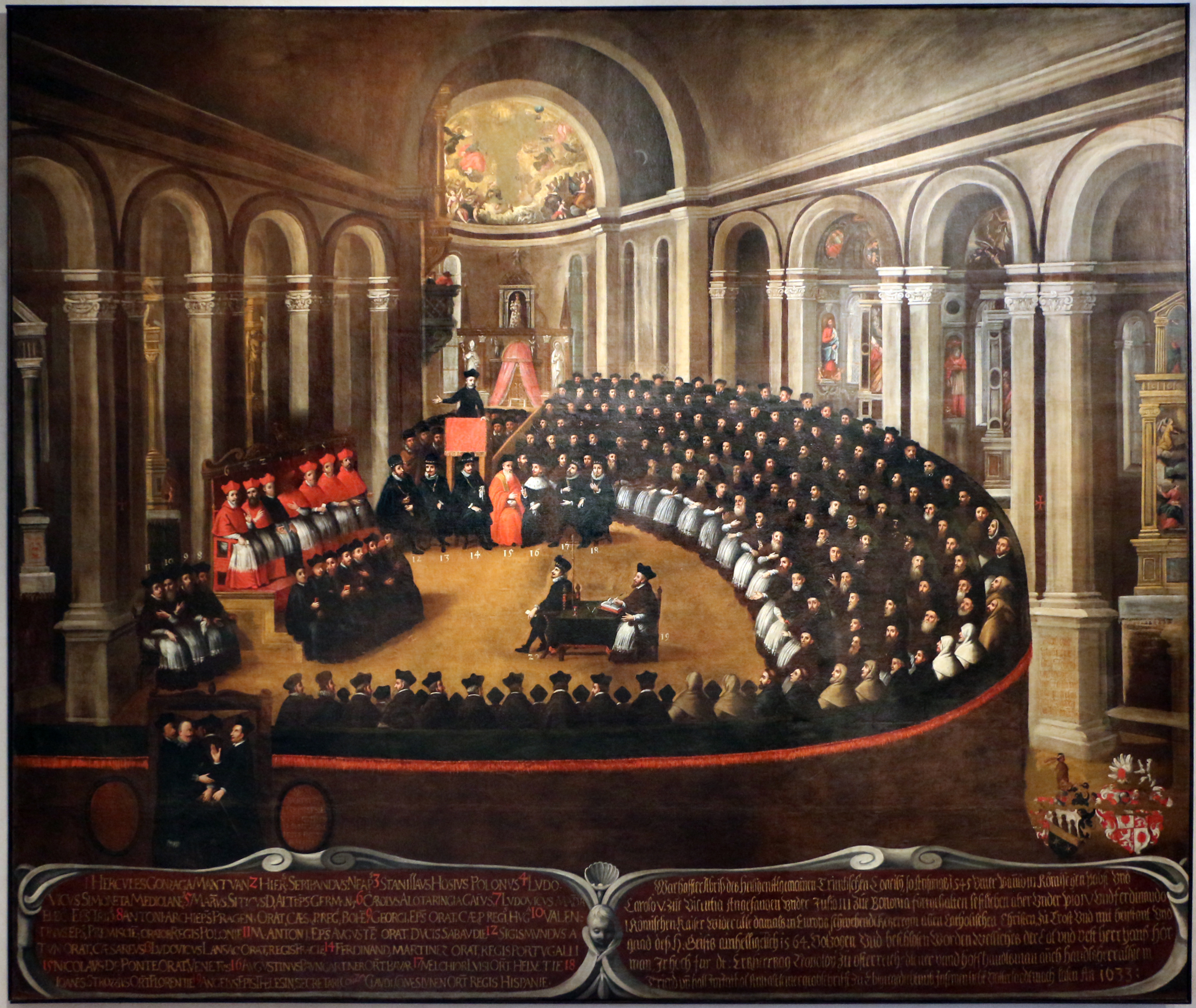
The Council of Trent held in Santa Maria Maggiore in a painting preserved in the Tridentine Diocesan Museum.

Traditionally, the foundation of the cathedral was attributed to St. Vigilius, the third Bishop of Trento, in the late fourth of early fifth century, but archaeological investigations between 1974 and 1978 and again in 2007–2009 have cast further light on the story of the building. In the Roman period, there were public buildings, including public baths, on the site where the cathedral was later built. The original cathedral itself was built somewhat later than previously thought, in the late fifth or early sixth century, and had a large space divided into three naves. The chancel of this church, which was still in use towards the end of the tenth and eleventh centuries, contains traces of an opus sectile pavement dating to late antiquity, which was later replaced with a mosaic from the middle of the sixth century.

Between the late eighth and early ninth centuries a number of building works were undertaken on the cathedral, in particular the addition of richly decorated stone liturgical fittings, including a rood screen and a ciborium. In the late tenth or early eleventh centuries the old church was demolished, and its structure, including the Carolingian fittings, were used as building materials for a new church, smaller than the previous one. It had a semicircular central apse with two side-apses.

Evidence from a find of coins indicates that after 1290 a third church was built on the site of the previous one. This one had two naves ending in symmetrical apses. This building preserved, among other elements of earlier edifices, fragments of frescoes and parts of a Gothic fascicule semi-pillar at one of its entrances. In 1520, work started on the current church, at the direction of Bernardo Clesio. Between 1899 and 1901 further works and restoration modified the renaissance façade.

Santa Maria Maggiore was the site of the Third Session of the Council of Trent (1545–1563). After archaeological and restoration works, the church reopened to the public in April 2012 and the altar was consecrated on 30 September 2012.

== Architecture ==
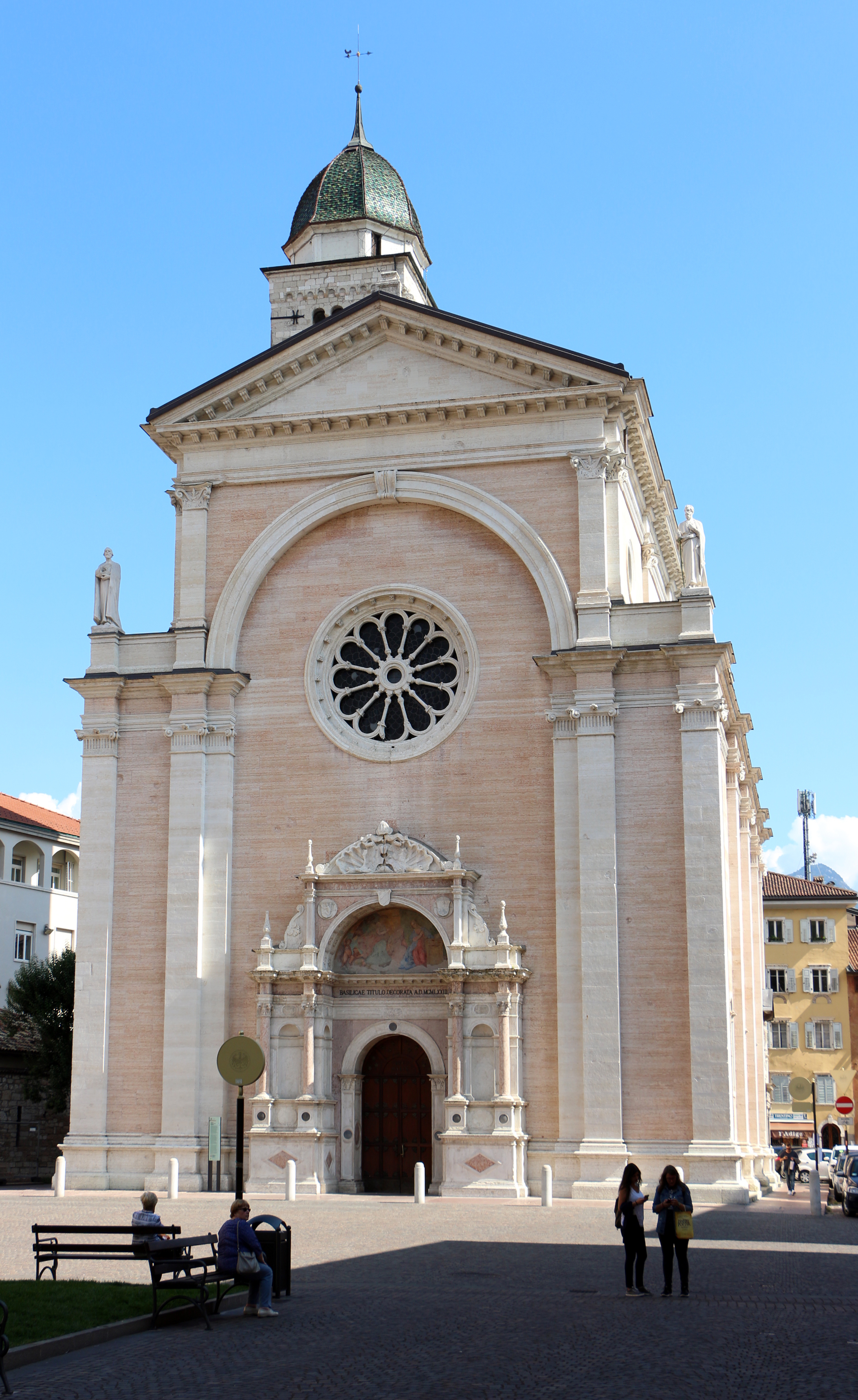
Main façade of Santa Maria Maggiore

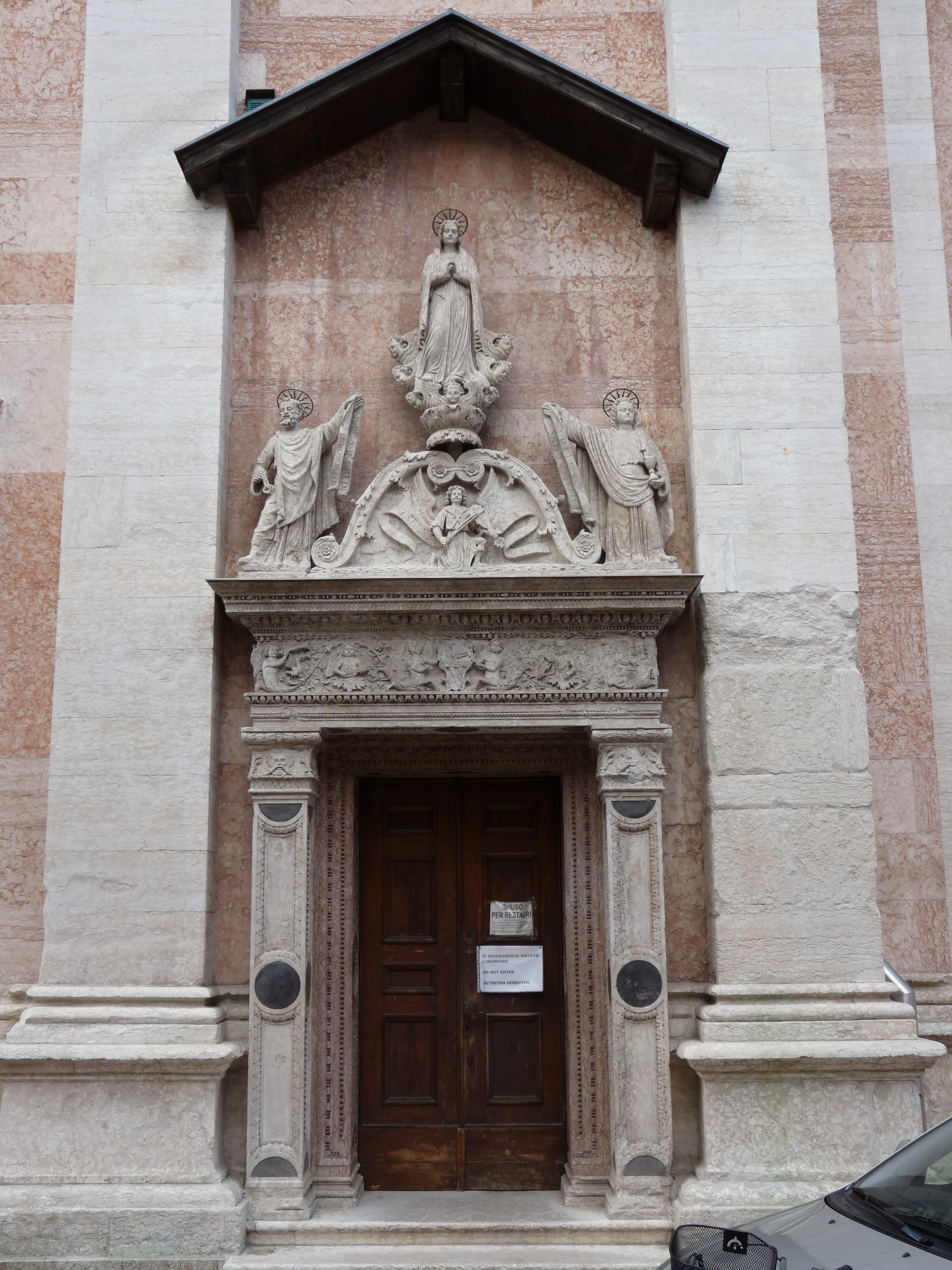
Portal of the southern entrance

The Renaissance church begun in 1520 is built in red and white stone. The main façade consists of an arched entrance in renaissance style with a door commissioned by Prince-Archbishop Cristoforo Madruzzo in 1539. Above the door is a lunette depicting the Annunciation. The bell tower, 53 metres high, is the tallest in the city. Constructed of white limestone, it has two rows of three-mullioned Romanesque windows and a polygonal cupola. Beside the church stands a column erected in 1845 memorialising the celebrations for the third centenary of the opening of the Council of Trent.

The interior of the church consists of a single nave. Along the sides are a series of chapels with marble altars in the baroque style. There are also a series of altarpieces and the baroque sarcophagus containing relics attributed to Saint Clement. Of historical significance also is the series of paintings which depict sense from the Council of Trent and some of the main figures of the Counter-Reformation. The choir is at the north end of the presbytery and consists of a large gallery with bas-reliefs, held up by four finely worked corbels.

== Pipe organ ==
On the chancel of the presbytery there is a Mascioni pipe organ, opus 402m, built in 1928, which re-used the casing of the old 1536 organ. It was restored and widened in 1953 following damage during the second world war. The instrument is electrically powered and has three keyboards, each of 58 notes, 30 pedals, and a total of 58 registers. The casing, with a Serlian arch structure, displays the pipes in a single cusp on each side and three cusps in the centre.

== Bibliography ==
- Andrea Baroncioni, La città di Trento tra tardo antico e alto medioevo: la genesi della città medievale e lo spazio del sacro, tesi di Dottorato in Archeologia, Università di Bologna, 2012.
- Michelle Beghelli, Scultura altomedievale dagli scavi di Santa Maria Maggiore a Trento. Dal reperto al contesto, Bologna, BraDypUS, 2013. ISBN 9788898392001.
- Ruggero Boschi, Gianni Ciurletti, Corpus provvisorio dei reperti lapidei scolpiti, in Atti del 6º Congresso Internazionale di Studi sull'Alto Medioevo (Milano, 21-25 ottobre 1978), Spoleto 1980, pp. 341–354.
- Gianni Ciurletti, La zona archeologica di Santa Maria Maggiore a Trento, in Restauri e Acquisizioni 1974–1978, Trento, 1978, pp. 305–311.
- Domenica Primerano, La basilica di Santa Maria Maggiore in Trento, Trento, 1993.
- Iginio Rogger, Storia della chiesa di Trento. Da Vigilio al XIX secolo, Trento, 2009.
- Massimo Zanfini, Aspetti dell'architettura religiosa a Trento: il caso della basilica di S. Maria Maggiore, tesi di Dottorato in Archeologia, Università di Bologna, 2013.
- Hanns-Paul Ties, "Zur Bedeutung des Konzils von Trient für die Kunst seiner Zeit. Materialien und offene Fragen", in Von kurzer Dauer? Fallbeispiele zu temporären Kunstzentren der Vormoderne, a cura di Birgit Ulrike Münch, Andreas Tacke, Markwart Herzog, Sylvia Heudecker (Kunsthistorisches Forum Irsee, vol. 3), Petersberg 2016, pp. 103–125.
