= Bishopric of Trent =

Bishopric of Trent may refer to:

- Roman Catholic Diocese of Trent, spiritual jurisdiction of the bishop of Trent, an archdiocese since 1929
- Prince-Bishopric of Trent, secular jurisdiction of the bishop as a prince of the Holy Roman Empire between 1027 and 1803
