= Archdiocese of Trento =

Roman Catholic archdiocese in Italy

Coordinates: 46.0667°N 11.1167°E

Archdiocese of Trent Archidioecesis Tridentina Arcidiocesi di Trento

Catholic
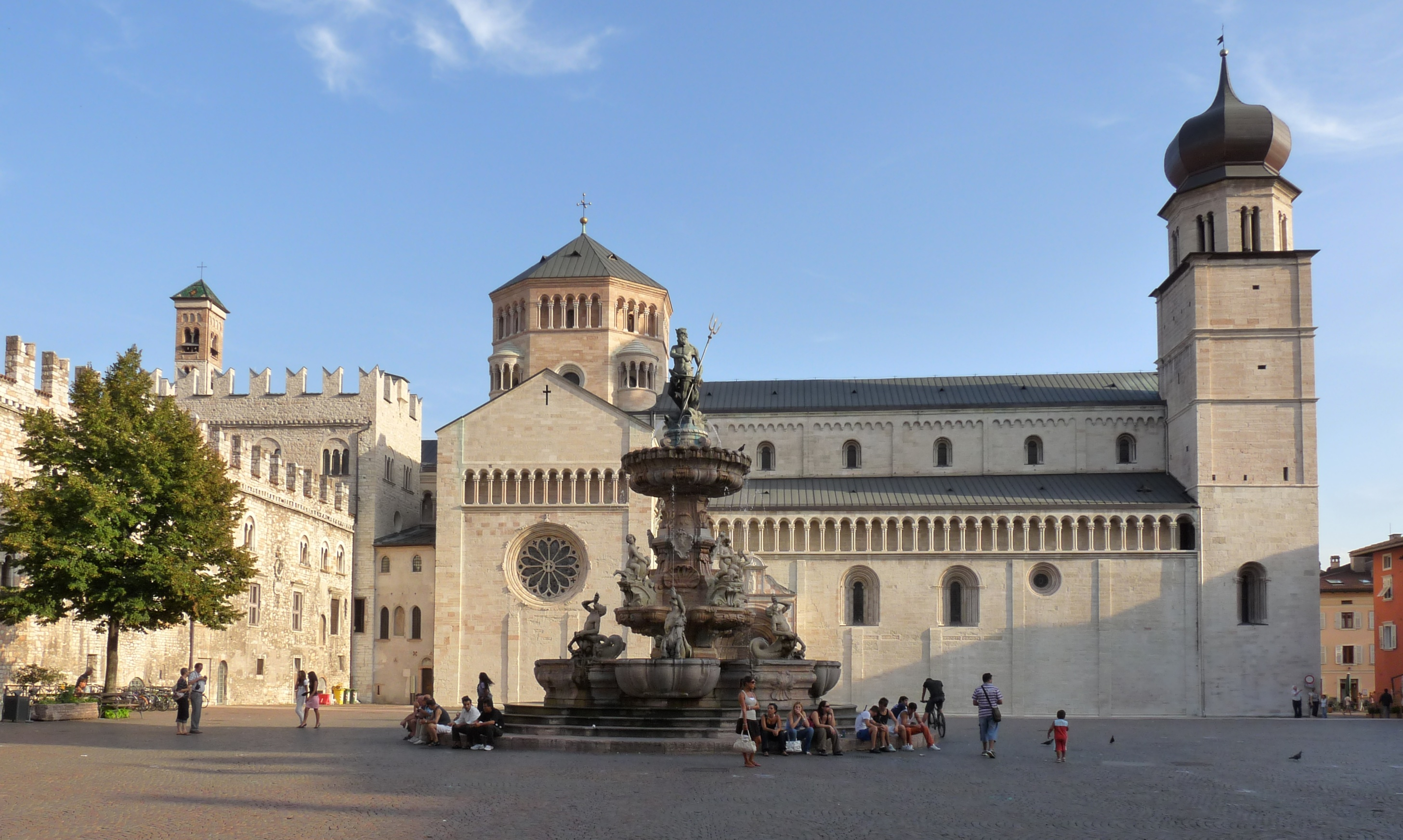
- Trento Cathedral

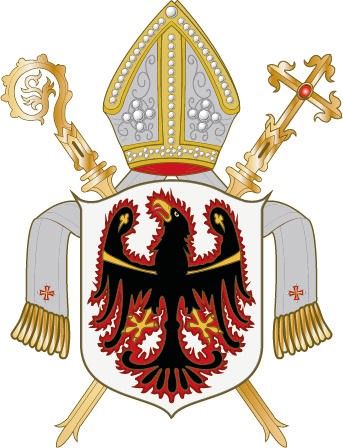
- Coat of arms

Location
- Country: Italy
- Ecclesiastical province: Trento

Statistics
- Area: 6,212 km^{2} (2,398 sq mi)
- Population: Total; Catholics: (as of 2023); 542,158 ▲; 485,000 (guess) ▼
- Parishes: 450 ▼

Information
- Denomination: Catholic Church
- Rite: Roman Rite
- Established: 4th century
- Cathedral: Basilica Cattedrale di S. Vigilio Vescovo
- Secular priests: 255 (diocesan) ▼172 (Religious Orders) ▼30 Permanent Deacons ▲

Current leadership
- Pope: Leo XIV
- Metropolitan Archbishop: Lauro Tisi
- Bishops emeritus: Luigi Bressan

Map

Website
- Chiesa di Trento

The Archdiocese of Trento (Latin: Archidioecesis Tridentina, German Trient) is a Latin Metropolitan archdiocese of the Catholic Church in the Triveneto, named after its see in Alpine Italy, Trento (Tr(i)ent), in Trentino-Alto Adige region.

The seat (throne) of the archbishop is in the Minor basilica Cattedrale di S. Vigilio Vescovo in Trento. The diocese has two other minor basilicas: the Basilica S. Maria Maggiore (city of Trento), and the Basilica di Ss. Sisinio, Martirio e Alessandro (Sanzeno).

== History ==
It is said that Christianity was introduced in the Val d'Adige circa 200 AD, where the Diocese of Trento was later established. The diocese, however, was a creation of the 4th century. It became a suffragan of the Patriarchs of Aquileia-Grado.

The original cathedral of S. Vigilius was founded c. 400, and restored and rebuilt several times during the Middle Ages. It was rededicated under Bishop Altmannus by the Patriarch of Aquileia, Peregrinus, in 1145.

On 31 May 1027, the Emperor Conrad II granted the bishops of Trent the County of Trent, and thereby beginning the history of the Prince-Bishopric of Trent as a state of the Holy Roman Empire.

The Patriarchate of Aquileia was suppressed by Pope Benedict XIV, who, on 18 April 1752, created the Archdiocese of Gorizia, and made Trento subject to Gorizia.

In 1786, it gained territory from the Diocese of Feltre.

=== French occupation ===
In August 1797, French invasion troops under General Masséna occupied Trent. They were forced to retreat in the winter, due to the Austrian advance. But they returned in January 1801, and after the Treaty of Lunéville on 9 February 1801, the prince-bishopric of Trent was abolished and its government secularized (1803); its territory was handed over to Austria and made a part of the County of Tyrol. In 1805, Trent, Tyrol, and the city and territory of Roveredo were transferred to the Kingdom of Bavaria. In 1810, the Emperor Napoleon transferred Trent to his new Kingdom of Italy, declaring Trent to be the capital of the Department of Alto Adige, and requiring it to be administered entirely by Italians.

=== Restoration ===
From 1809 until 1814, Pope Pius VII was a prisoner in France, and unable to deal with the changes being made by Napoleon. On his fall, however, the pope faced a chaos in the Churches which had suffered the intrusion of the French. New diplomatic and ecclesiastical arrangements (concordats) with the various restored powers were necessary. On 9 May 1818, therefore, Pius VII issued the bull Ex Imposito, formalizing the agreements which had been reached with the Austrian Emperor Francis I concerning the provinces of Tyrol and Vorarlberg. The Pope noted that in a very large area there were only three dioceses (Salzburg, Trent, and Brixen) and one vicariate (Feldkirch). He announced his intention to elevate Feldkirch into a diocese. In the bull, he assigned new limits to each of the dioceses by listing the parishes; Trent gained a few parishes from Brixen. No metropolitan is named in the bull. Salzburg had been secularized at the same time as Trent, and the archbishop had died in 1812. At the time of the bull, the archbishopric of Salzburg was vacant; it was reconstituted in 1823.

On 29 September 1822, in the bull Quae Nos Gravissimi, on a petition presented by Count Antal Apponyi, ambassador of the Emperor Francis I to the Holy See, Pope Pius VII granted the emperor the privilege of nominating the bishops of Trent and Brixen. The bull states that this was done with the consent of the Chapters of the two cathedrals (who thereby lost their right to free election of their bishop), as well as of the bishop of Brixen.

=== Metropolitan of Salzburg ===
On 7 March 1825, Pope Leo XII issued the bull Ubi Primum, in which he named Salzburg as the metropolitan of the ecclesiastical province, and assigned as suffragans the dioceses of Trent, Brixen, Gurk, Seckau, and Lavant. In the same document he determined that the cathedral Chapter of Trent should have three dignities (the Dean, the Provost, and the Archdeacon) and four Canons. One of the Canons was to serve as Penitentiary, another as Theologus, "who, on stated days, should explain holy scripture."

=== Archdiocese of Trent ===
On 14 June 1929, by the bull Inter Ceteras, Pope Pius XI raised diocese of Trent to the status of an archdiocese.

On 6 July 1964, by the bull Quo Aptius, Pope Paul VI removed territory from the diocese of Trent and assigned it to the Diocese of Brixen (Bressanone).

The archdiocese of Trent only became a metropolitan see on 6 August 1964, when Pope Paul VI issued the bull Tridentinae Ecclesiae, creating a new ecclesiastical province and naming the newly created Diocese of Bolzano-Brixen as its only suffragan.

Pope John Paul II visited in July 1988 and April 1995. On the latter occasion, on 30 April 1995, he beatified Bishop Johann Nepomuk von Tschiderer zu Gleifheim, a 19th-century bishop of Trent.

=== Diocesan synods ===
A diocesan synod was an irregularly held, but important, meeting of the bishop of a diocese and his clergy. Its purpose was (1) to proclaim generally the various decrees already issued by the bishop; (2) to discuss and ratify measures on which the bishop chose to consult with his clergy; (3) to publish statutes and decrees of the diocesan synod, of the provincial synod, and of the Holy See.

Bishop Fredericus von Wangen (1207–1218) presided over a diocesan synod in Trent in 1208, and issued Synodal Statutes concerning the election of church dignities. The Teutonic Knight, Fr. Henricus, O.T. (1274–1289), held a diocesan synod on 6 November 1276. Bishop Enrico di Metz (1310–1336) held a diocesan synod on 14 January 1336, the complete proceedings of which were published by Benedetto Bonelli. In 1344, Bishop Nicolò da Bruna (1338–1347) held a diocesan synod.

A diocesan synod was held in the cathedral of Trent by Bishop Udalrich Frundsberg (1486–1493) on 17–18 March 1489. Bishop Uldarich von Liechtenstein (1486–1505) held a synod on 4–5 April 1497.

Bishop Georg von Neideck (1506–1514) held a diocesan synod. Cardinal Bernhard von Cles (1514–1539) held a diocesan synod, in 1538. Cardinal Ludovico Madruzzo (1567–1600) held a diocesan synod in 1575, in which it was decreed that clerics should not grow mustaches, since it might interfere with drinking the blood of Christ from the communion cup. Madruzzo held another synod in 1593.

== Bishops and archbishops ==
=== Bishops of Trento ===
==== to 900 ====
- Iovinus (mid-4th cent.)
- Abundantius (attested 381)
- Vigilius of Trent (c.387–c.400)
- Claudianus
- Magorius

...

- Agnellus (attested 571–591)

...

- Joannes

...

- Clementianus
- Amator (end of 8th cent.)
- Iltigario (c. 802 ?)
- Voldericus (attested 813)
- Daniel
- Heimpertus (attested 827–845)
- Odescalchus (attested 855–864)
- Adelgisus (attested 874–881)

...

==== 900 to 1200 ====
- Conradus (Konrad) (900–926)
- Ioannes (926–927)
- Bernardo (927–932)
- Manasse of Arles (932–957)
- Lantramno (957–963)
- Arnoldo di Pavia (963–971)
- Raimondo di Caldore (992–1004)
- Uldarico di Flavon (1004–1022)
- Uldarico (II?) (1022–1055)
- Azzo (1055–1065)
- Enrico (1068–1082)
- Bernardo (1082–1084)
- Adalperone (1084–1106)
- Gebardo (1106–1120)
- Adelpreto (1120–1124)
- Altmannus (1124–1149)
- Arnoldus (1149–1154)
- Eberardus (1154–1156)
- Adelpretus II (1156–1177)
- Salomone (1177–1183)
- Albertus de Madruzzo (1184–1188)
- Conradus de Beseno (1188–1205)

==== 1200 to 1500 ====
Sede vacante (1205–1207)

- Fredericus von Wangen (1207–1218)
- Adelpretus III de Ravenstein (1219–1223)
- Gerardus Oscasali (1223–1232)
- Aldrighetto di Castelcampo (1232–1247)
- Egnon von Eppan (1250–1273)
- Henricus, O.T. (1274–1289)
- Filippo Buonacolsi (1289–1303)
- Bartolomeo Querini (1304–1307)
- Enrico di Metz (1310–1336)
- Nicolò da Bruna (1338–1347)
- Geraldus de Manhac (1347–1348)
- Joannes de Pistorio (1348–1349)
- Meinhard of Neuhaus (1349–1360)
- Albert von Ortenburg (1360–1390)
- Georg von Liechtenstein-Nicolsburg (1390–1419)
- Aleksander Mazowiecki (1424–1444)

Theobaldus von Wolkenstein (1444–1446) Intrusus

- Benedict of Trent, O.S.B. (1444–1446)
- Georg Hack von Themeswald (1446–1465)
- Johannes Hinderbach (1466–1486)
- Udalrich Frundsberg (1486–1493)
- Uldarich von Liechtenstein (1486–1505)

==== 1500 to 1800 ====
- Georg von Neideck (1506–1514)
- Cardinal Bernhard von Cles (1514–1539)
- Cardinal Cristoforo Madruzzo (1539–1567)
- Cardinal Ludovico Madruzzo (1567–1600)
- Cardinal Carlo Gaudenzio Madruzzo (1600–1629)
- Carlo Emanuele Madruzzo (1629–1658)
- Sigismund Francis, Archduke of Austria (1659–1665) Bishop-elect
- Ernst Adalbert von Harrach zu Rohrau (1665–1667)
- Sigmund Alphons von Thun (1669–1677)
- Francesco Alberti di Poja (1678–1689)
- Giuseppe Vittorio Alberti d’Enno (1691–1695)
- Johann Michael von Spaur und Valör (1696–1725)

Giovanni Benedetti Gentilotti (1725) Bishop-elect

- Antonius Dominikus von Wolkenstein-Trostburg (1726–1730)
- Dominikus Anton von Thun (1730–1758)

Leopold Ernst von Fimian (1748–1756) Coadjutor

- Francesco Felice Alberti d’Enno (1758–1762)
- Cristoforo Sizzo de Noris (1763–1776)
- Peter von Thun und Hohenstein (1776–1800)

==== since 1800 ====
- Emanuel Maria Thun (1800–1818)

Sede vacante (1818–1824)

- Franz Xaver Luschin (1824–1834)
- Johann Nepomuk von Tschiderer zu Gleifheim (1834–1860)
- Benedetto Riccabona de Reinchenfels (1861–1879)
- Giovanni Giacomo della Bona (1880–1885)
- Eugenio Carlo Valussi (1886–1903)
- Celestino Endrici (1904–1929–1940)

=== Archbishops of Trento ===
- Celestino Endrici (1929–1940)
- Carlo de Ferrari, C.S.S. (1941–1962)
- Alessandro Maria Gottardi (1963–1987)
- Giovanni Maria Sartori (1987–1998)
- Luigi Bressan (1999–2016)
- Lauro Tisi (2016 – present)

== See also ==
- Timeline of Trento

== Books ==
=== Episcopal lists ===
- Eubel, Conradus, ed. (1913). Hierarchia catholica (in Latin). Vol. Tomus 1 (second ed.). Münster: Libreria Regensbergiana.
- Eubel, Conradus, ed. (1914). Hierarchia catholica (in Latin). Vol. Tomus 2 (second ed.). Münster: Libreria Regensbergiana.
- Gulik, Guilelmus (1923). Eubel, Conradus (ed.). Hierarchia catholica (in Latin). Vol. Tomus 3 (second ed.). Münster: Libreria Regensbergiana.
- Gams, Pius Bonifatius (1873). Series episcoporum Ecclesiae catholicae: quotquot innotuerunt a beato Petro apostolo (in Latin). Ratisbon: Typis et Sumptibus Georgii Josephi Manz. pp. 316–317.
- Gauchat, Patritius (Patrice) (1935). Hierarchia catholica (in Latin). Vol. Tomus IV (1592-1667). Münster: Libraria Regensbergiana.
- Ritzler, Remigius; Sefrin, Pirminus (1952). Hierarchia catholica medii et recentis aevi (in Latin). Vol. Tomus V (1667-1730). Patavii: Messagero di S. Antonio.
- Ritzler, Remigius; Sefrin, Pirminus (1958). Hierarchia catholica medii et recentis aevi (in Latin). Vol. Tomus VI (1730-1799). Patavii: Messagero di S. Antonio.
- Ritzler, Remigius; Sefrin, Pirminus (1968). Hierarchia Catholica medii et recentioris aevi (in Latin). Vol. VII (1800–1846). Monasterii: Libreria Regensburgiana.
- Ritzler, Remigius; Sefrin, Pirminus (1978). Hierarchia catholica Medii et recentioris aevi (in Latin). Vol. VIII (1846–1903). Il Messaggero di S. Antonio.
- Pięta, Zenon (2002). Hierarchia catholica medii et recentioris aevi (in Latin). Vol. IX (1903–1922). Padua: Messagero di San Antonio. ISBN 978-88-250-1000-8.

=== Studies ===
- Bonelli, Benedetto (1760). Notizie istorico-critiche intorno al B. M. Adelpreto Vescovo, e comprotettore della chiesa di Trento (in Italian). Vol. primo. Trento: Monauni. Bonelli, Benedetto (1761). Volume secondo. Bonelli, Benedetto (1762). Volume terzo, parte prima. Bonelli, Benedetto (1765). Voluminis tertii pars altera (III.2).
- Brackmann, Albert (1911). Germania pontificia Vol. I: Provincia Salisburgensis et Episcopatus Tridentinus. Berlin: Weidmann. (in Latin) pp. 398–410.
- Curzel, Emanuele (1994–5). Il Capitolo della cattedrale di Trento, dal XII secolo al 1348. Tesi di dottorato in Storia medievale – VII ciclo. Università Cattolica del Sacro Cuore. Milano. (in Italian)
- Curzel, Emanuele (2004). Documenti papali per la storia trentina (fino al 1341). Bologna: Il Mulino (Annali dell’Istituto storico italo-germanico in Trento. Fonti, 1) (in Latin)
- Curzel, Emanuele (2005). Chiese trentine. Ricerche storiche su territori, persone e istituzioni. Sommacampagna (Vr): Cierre (Biblioteca dei Quaderni di Storia Religiosa, 4). (in Italian)
- Curzel, Emanuele and Varanini, Gian Maria (edd.) (2011). La documentazione dei vescovi di Trento : (XI secolo-1218). Bologna: Il mulino, 2011. (in Italian)
- Gar, Tommaso; degli Alberti, Francesco Felice (1860). Annali del principato ecclesiastico di Trento dal 1022 al 1540, compilati sui documenti da F.F. degli Alberti (in Italian). Trento: Monauni.
- Kink, Rudolf (1852). Codex Wangianus: Urkundenbuch des Hochstiftes Trient (in Latin and German). Wien: K.k. Hof.- u. Staatsdr.
- Landi, Walter (2014). "Il palatium episcopatus di Trento fra XI e XIII secolo. Dato documentario ed evidenze architettoniche." In: Franco Cagol, Silvano Groff, Serena Luzzi (edd.), La torre di piazza nella storia di Trento: funzioni, simboli, immagini. Atti della giornata di studio: Trento, 27 febbraio 2012. Trento: Società di Studi Trentini di Scienze Storiche (Monografie. Nuova serie, 3). ISBN 978-88-8133-039-3. pp. 141–203. (in Italian)
- Lanzoni, Francesco (1927). Le diocesi d'Italia dalle origini al principio del secolo VII (an. 604). Faenza, pp. 934–40. (in Italian)
- Obermair, Hannes (2015). How to Record a Conflict? The Communities of the German Part of the Diocese of Trent during the Late Middle Ages. In Marco Bellabarba, Hannes Obermair, Hitomi Sato (eds.). Communities and Conflicts in the Alps from the Late Middle Ages to Early Modernity. (Fondazione Bruno Kessler. Contributi/Beiträge. 30). Bologna-Berlin: Il mulino—Duncker & Humblot. ISBN 978-88-15-25383-5, pp. 101–18.
- Ughelli, Ferdinando; Coleti, Niccolo (1720). Italia sacra (in Latin). Vol. Tomus quintus (5). Venice: Sebastianus Coletus. pp. 583–654.

== Sources and external links ==
- GCatholic.org page
- (in Italian) Official page
