= Tenuta San Leonardo =

Winery in Italy

Coordinates: 45.704448°N 10.9290566°E

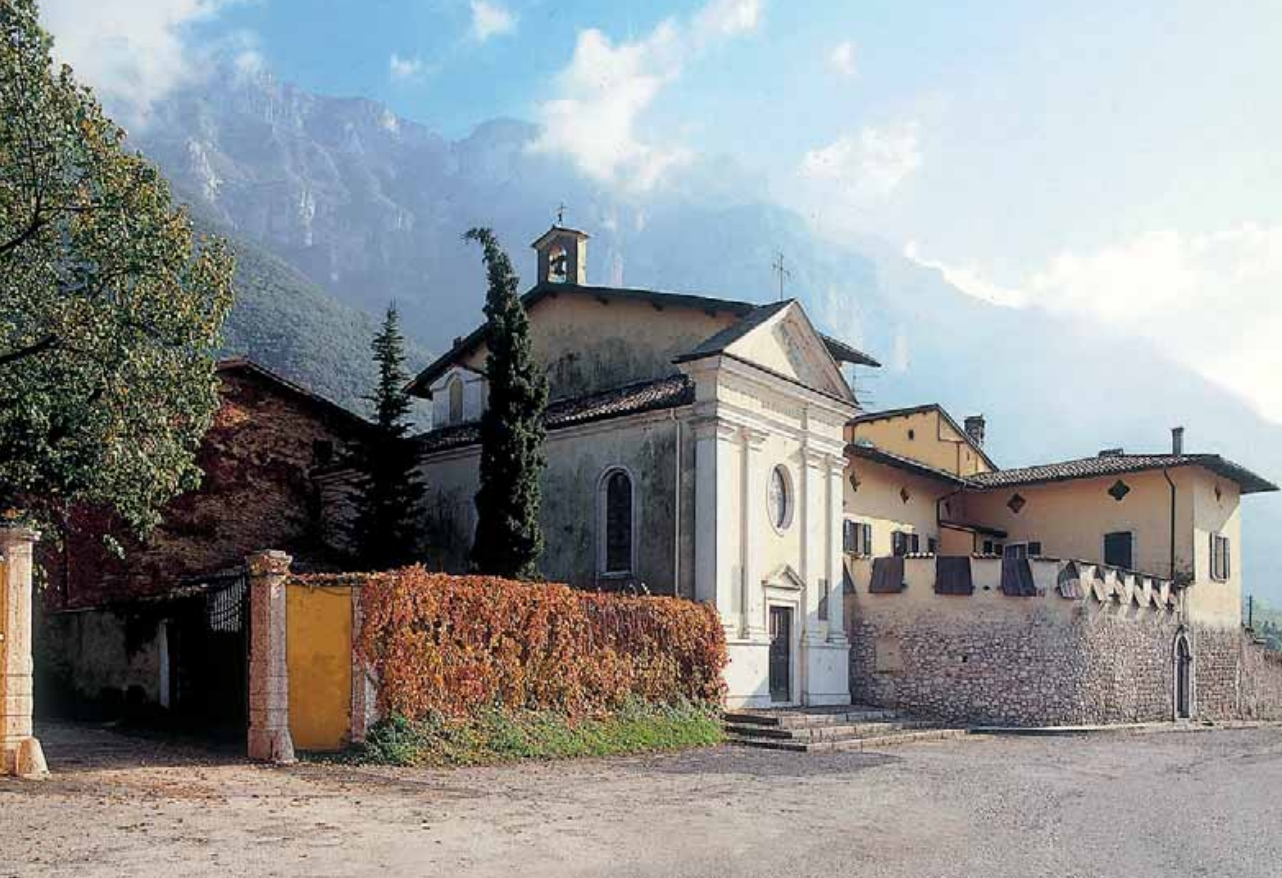
Tenuta San Leonardo

Tenuta San Leonardo is an estate of historical significance and an Italian wine producer in the Lagarina Valley in Trentino. It produces San Leonardo, a Bordeaux-style red wine which was described by journalist Jancis Robinson as "surely the most successful Bordeaux blend of northern Italy".

== History ==
The first historical reference to this fief-like estate dates from 589AD when the historian Paul the Deacon in the History of the Lombards records the location for the wedding between Theodelinda and the King of the Lombards Authari as “Campi Sarni/Sardis”, the ancient place name for the stretch of land where the estate is situated.

The estate is mentioned in 927AD by the Bishop of Verona Nokterio who conceded the use of the vineyards, woods and meadows “in Sarnes” to the Bishop of Trento, Federico Wanga. In 1982, a fresco was discovered in the apse of the Church of San Leonardo (dedicated to Saint Leonard of Noblac) which is found within the main courtyard of the estate, dating from 1100 to 1200 making it one of the oldest Romanesque frescoes in Trentino. The fresco features a Christ in Majesty in Mandorla with some elements resembling closely the frescoes of San Zeno in Verona.

The first significant development however took place in 1215 when the Bishop of Trento Federico Wanga officially called upon the Crutched Friars to set up a monastery at San Leonardo, at the time already serving as a hospice, including for those returning from the Crusades.

Due to its strategically important position along the Roman road Via Claudia Augusta which is still found intact on the estate, and approximately halfway between Verona and Trento, the monastery hosted several important figures including Pope Julius III and Pope Marcellus II at the time of the Council of Trent.

In 1656 Pope Alexander VII suppressed the order of the Crutched Friars and the estate was converted into a priory and eventually sold by emphyteusis to the de Gresti family in 1770. Tenuta San Leonardo was inherited by the Guerrieri Gonzaga family following the marriage of Gemma de Gresti and Tullo Guerrieri Gonzaga.

During World War I, the residence on the estate known as “Villa Gresti” was used as a base for the 29th Regiment of the Italian army. Following the defeat of Austria Hungary at the Battle of Vittorio Veneto, the Villa was chosen as the site for the negotiation of the terms of the Armistice of Villa Giusti which marked the end of warfare between Italy and Austria-Hungary. The negotiations began at Villa Gresti on 20 October 1918 and the Armistice was signed on 3 November at Villa Giusti.
