= Palazzo Salvadori, Trento =

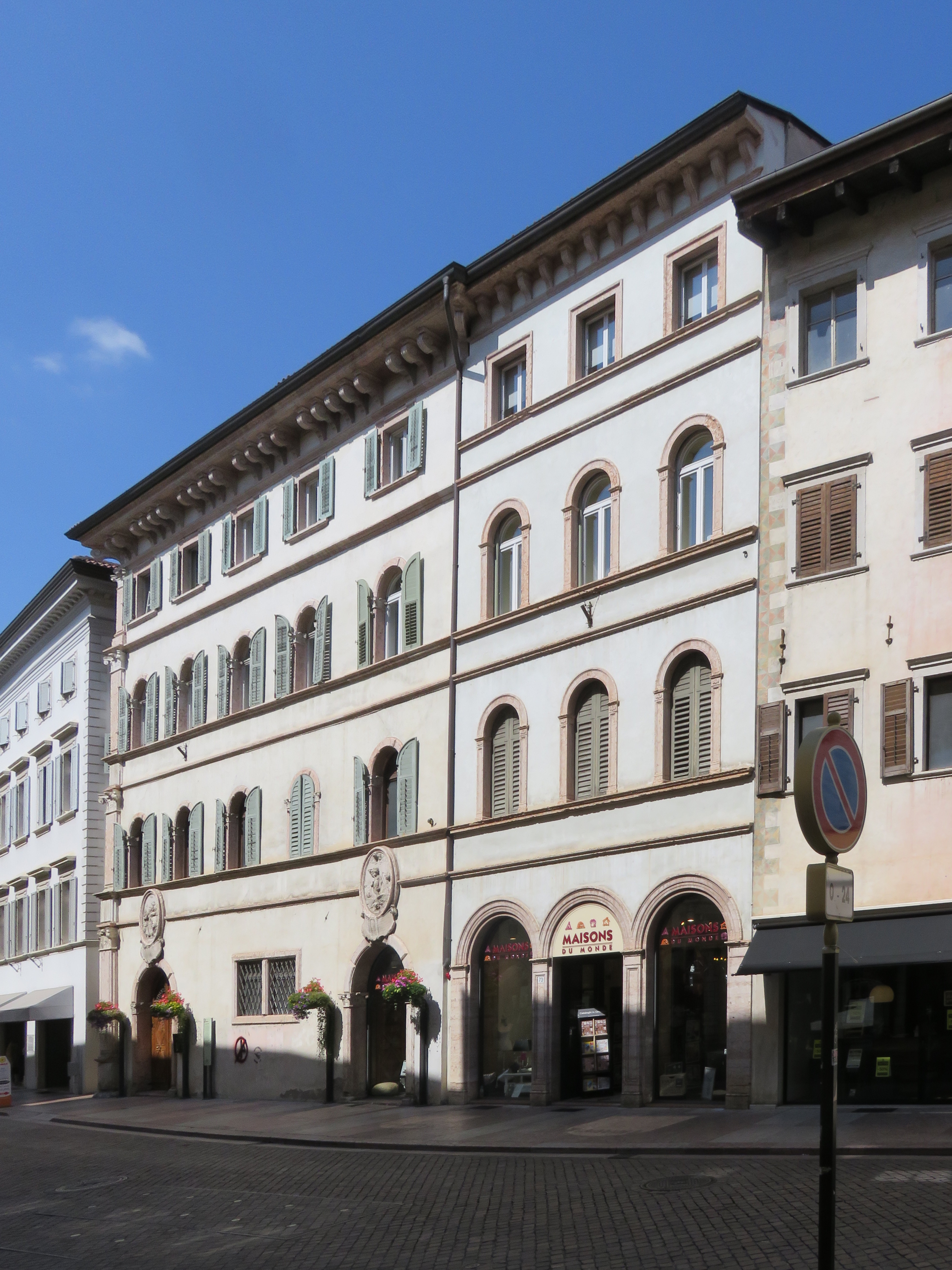
Façade

Palazzo Salvadori is a palazzo in Trento, northern Italy, one of the first examples of Renaissance civil architecture in the city.

== History ==
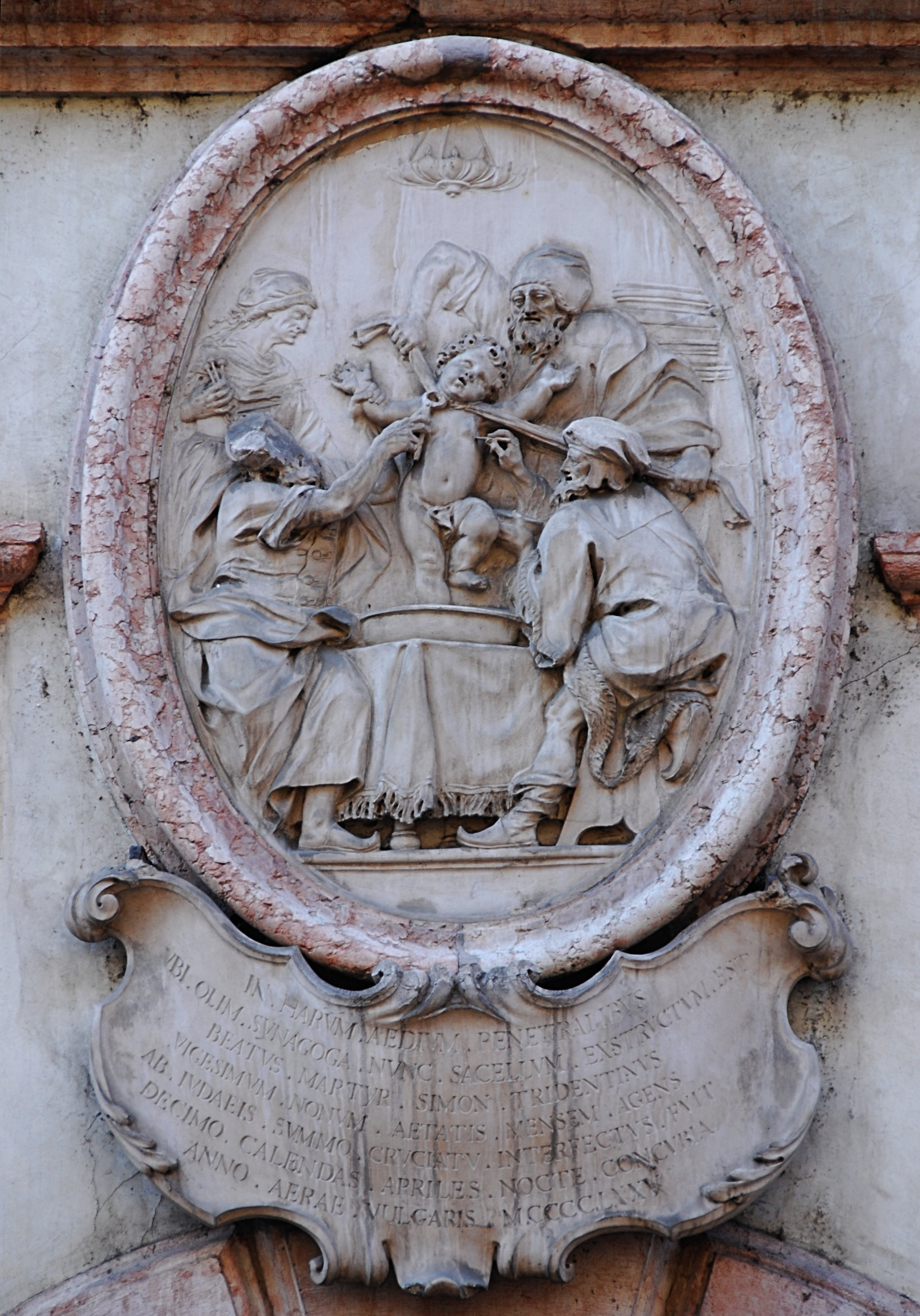
Stone medallion with the purported martyrdom scene of Simonino di Trento.

It was built by the Lombard master Lucio Tosani, during the reign of Prince-Bishop Bernardo Clesio, starting in 1515. Designed by the architect Lucio Tosani, the building is placed on the foundation of the old synagogue of the small Jewish community present in the city. For a long time belonged to the family of Trautmannsdorf, now the building presentes two main doors on which there are still two medallions, dating from the first half of the eighteenth century, painted by Francesco Oradini; representing the martyrdom of the child Simonino from Trento. The two-year-old child, found dead beneath the house of the Jew Samuel and drained of his blood, was allegedly the victim of a Jewish ritual murder during the Easter of 1475. In the aftermath of the child's death, 15 Jews were blamed and burnt at the stake, and the remaining Jewish families of Trento were expelled. Simonino was venerated as Blessed until 1965, but after the second Vatican Council the worship was banned. Around the mid-18th century above the two portals were placed the marble reliefs by Francesco Oradini depicting the purported martyrdom of the child Simone (Simon of Trent).
