= Celestino Endrici =

Italian Catholic archbishop

- Archbishop of Trento
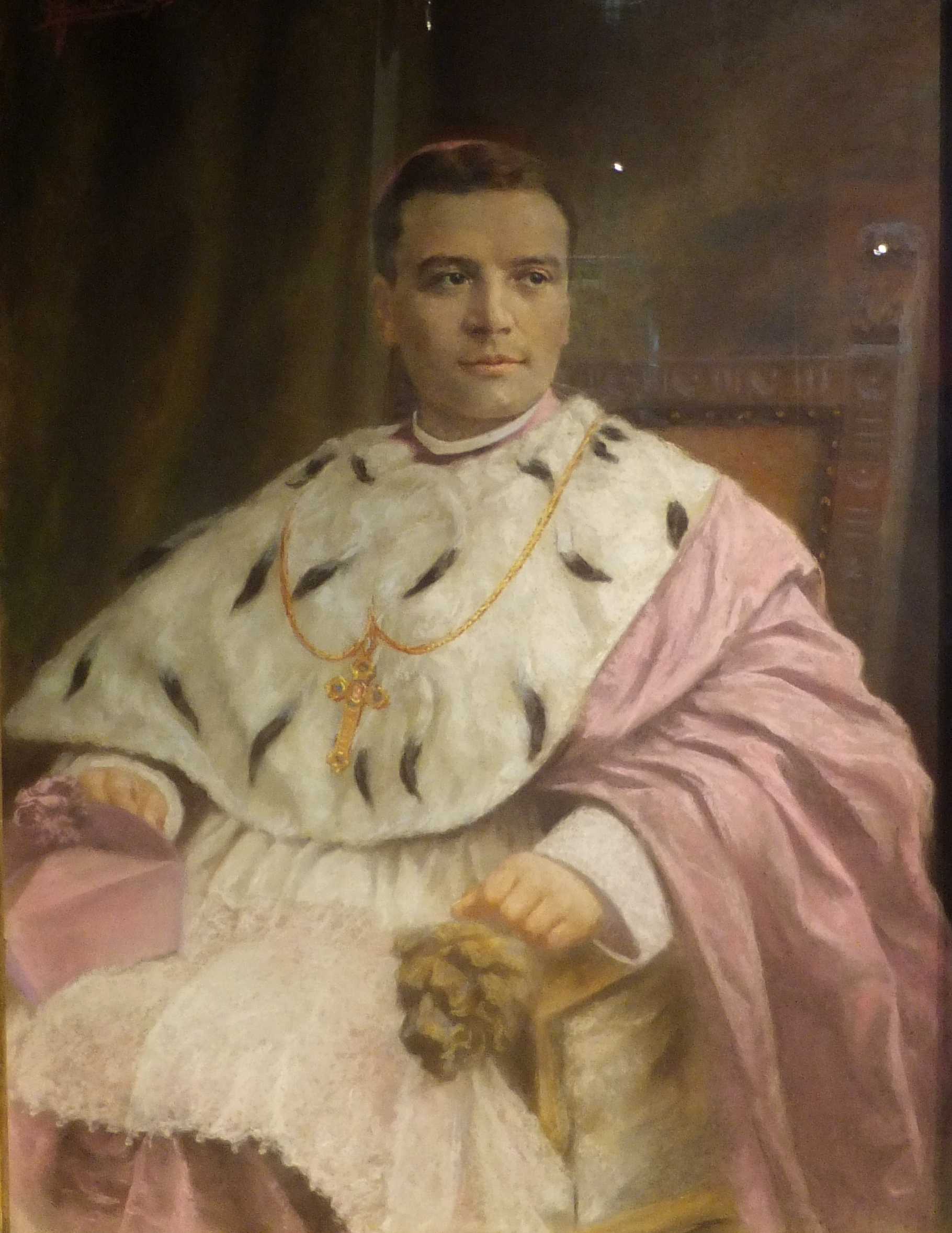
- Portrait of Mons. Endrici, by Giovanni Battista Chiocchetti (1905)
- Church: Catholic Church
- Archdiocese: Archdiocese of Trento
- In office: 6 February 1904 – 29 October 1940
- Predecessor: Eugenio Carlo Valussi
- Successor: Carlo De Ferrari

Orders
- Ordination: 28 October 1891
- Consecration: 13 March 1904 by Rafael Merry del Val

Personal details
- Born: 14 March 1866 Don, County of Tyrol, Austrian Empire
- Died: 29 October 1940 (aged 74) Trento, Trentino, Kingdom of Italy

Celestino Endrici (14 March 1866 – 29 October 1940, in Trento) was an Italian Catholic archbishop, from 1904 to 1940.

He was born into a large family of wealthy peasants of noble origins. He attended the Imperial Royal Lyceum of Trento then studied philosophy and theology at the Pontifical Gregorian University of Rome. He was ordained a priest on 28 October 1891. He returned to Trentino in 1892. From 1896 he taught moral theology at the seminary in Trento.

On 11 October 1903, the bishop of Trento, Eugenio Carlo Valussi died. He was confirmed by the Pope on 6 February, was consecrated on 13 March by Cardinal Rafael Merry del Val, and on 19 March he took possession of the Diocese.

Among his collaborators was Monsignor Guido de Gentili and Alcide De Gasperi. Later he began to feel the problem of nationality, and the outbreak of the First World War put him in a delicate position. On 1 March 1916, he retired and he was then transferred to Vienna.

After the war, he returned to Trento on 13 November 1918. Between 1921 and 1924 he went through a period of illness. In 1928 he helped De Gasperi, persecuted by Fascism, to be hired at the Vatican Apostolic Library. In June 1929 the Diocese of Trento became an archbishopric, and Endrici then became archbishop. He had a heart attack in 1934 and his pastoral action was affected, he died in 1940 after the outbreak of the Second World War.
