= Eriprando Madruzzo =

Eriprando Madruzzo (died 1547) was an Italian mercenary captain. The brother of the Bishop of Trent Cristoforo Madruzzo, he fought in Hungary against the Turks at the service of Charles V.

During the Italian Wars, he commanded the Imperial landsknechts at the Battle of Ceresole in 1544, being wounded in the fray. The following year, he was entrusted with the security of the Council of Trent.

In 1546, Madruzzo took part in the wars against the Protestants in Germany and died at Ulm in 1547.

== Bibliography ==
- Madruzzo genealogy (in Italian)
- Oman, Charles (1937). A History of the Art of War in the Sixteenth Century. London: Methuen & Co.
