= Ludovico Madruzzo =

Italian Roman Catholic cardinal and statesman

His Eminence Ludovico Madruzzo
- Prince-Bishop of Trent
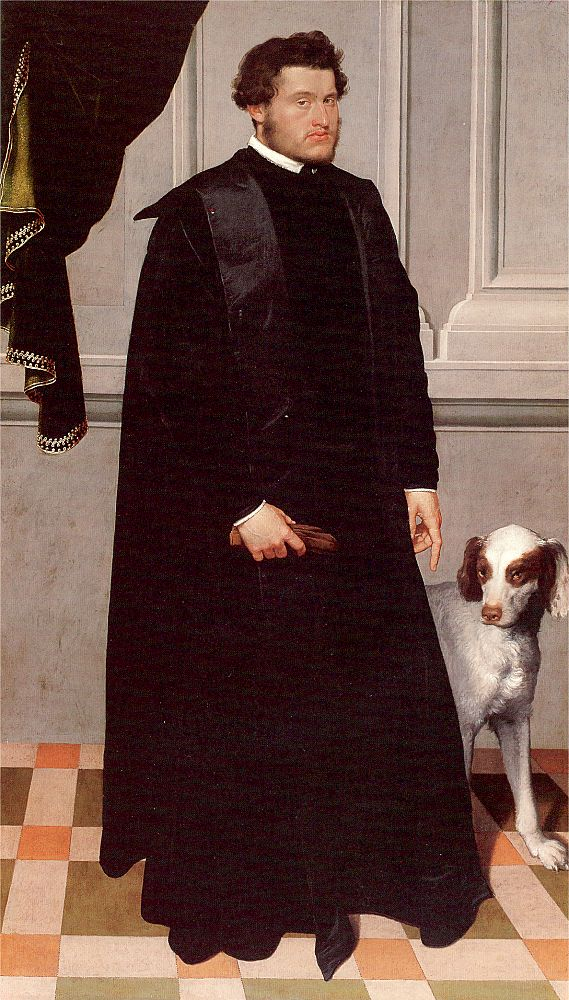
- Portrait of Ludovico Madruzzo by Giovanni Battista Moroni. Art Institute, Chicago.
- Church: Catholic Church
- Diocese: Trent
- Appointed: 14 November 1567
- Term ended: 20 April 1600
- Predecessor: Cristoforo Madruzzo
- Successor: Carlo Gaudenzio Madruzzo
- Other posts: Cardinal-Bishop of Frascati (1600)
- Previous posts: See list: Cardinal-Deacon of San Callisto (1561–1562); Cardinal-Priest of Sant'Anastasia (1586-1591); Cardinal-Priest of San Lorenzo in Lucina (1591-1597); Cardinal-Bishop of Sabina (1597-1600)

Orders
- Ordination: 1564
- Consecration: 18 June 1570 by Stanislaus Hosius
- Created cardinal: 26 February 1561 by Pope Pius IV
- Rank: Cardinal-Bishop

Personal details
- Born: 1532 Trento, Italy
- Died: 20 April 1600 (aged 67–68) Rome, Papal States
- Buried: San Lorenzo in Lucina
- Coat of arms: Ludovico Madruzzo's coat of arms

Ludovico Madruzzo (1532-1600) was an Italian Roman Catholic cardinal and statesman, the Imperial crown-cardinal and Prince-Bishop of the Bishopric of Trento (involving the secular rule as well as church duties).

== Biography ==
Born in Trento, he was the son of baron Niccolò Madruzzo and Helene of Lamberg, and nephew of Cristoforo Madruzzo, Prince-Bishop of Trento. He studied at the universities of Leuven and Paris.

In 1550 his uncle Cristoforo, named Governor of Milan, entrusted him the administration of the Bishopric of Trento, where the Council of Trent had been in intermittent progress since 1545; it was to continue until 1563. After numerous important diplomatic and political experiences (including the mourning discourse at Charles V's funeral), he was created cardinal in 1561 by Pope Pius IV, given the titular church of San Callisto. Six years later he was appointed titular of the diocese of Trento.

Madruzzo took part in the last Council of Trent in 1562-3, the Diet of Augsburg in 1582 and Diet of Regesburg in 1594; he also attended imperial court in 1581.

Under agreements between Bernardo Clesio and Cristoforo Madruzzo, the bishopric had gained a substantial independence from the Habsburg-controlled county of Tyrol, and this caused strife between Ludovico and the Austrian archduke Ferdinand II. The latter invaded Trentine territory in 1567, and Ludovico moved to Rome, waiting for a diplomatic resolution of the conflict. Trento's authority was re-established by the Diet of Speyer in 1587.

Ludovico Madruzzo was a friend of St. Charles Borromeo and St. Philip Neri.

He died in Rome in 1600, two months after being appointed Cardinal-Bishop of Frascati. He was succeeded by his nephew Carlo Gaudenzio.

== See also ==
- Carlo Emanuele Madruzzo

Catholic Church titles
Preceded by Cristoforo Madruzzo	Prince-Bishop of Trento; 1567–1600	Succeeded by Carlo Gaudenzio Madruzzo
