= Carlo Gaudenzio Madruzzo =

Italian Roman Catholic cardinal and statesman

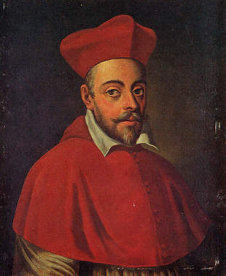
Carlo Gaudenzio Madruzzo

Carlo Gaudenzio Madruzzo or Charles-Gaudence de Madrus in French (1562 – 14 August 1629) was an Italian Roman Catholic cardinal and statesman.

== Biography ==
Born in the castle of Issogne, Aosta Valley, he was the son of Baron Giovanni Federico Madruzzo and Isabelle of Challant, and nephew of Cardinal Ludovico Madruzzo, Prince-Bishop of Trento.

After his studies in Ivrea, Trento and Ingolstadt, Carlo Gaudenzio graduated in law at the University of Pavia in 1586. He perfected his formation in Rome with his uncle. In 1595, he was named auxiliary bishop of Trento and, at Ludovico's death (1600), titular bishop. On 9 June 1604 he also received the title of cardinal by Pope Clement VIII, being given the titulus of San Cesareo in Palatio.

In his rule of the diocese, Madruzzo fought heresy and the (often alleged) presence of witchcraft in Trentino, as well as in enforcing the dispositions of the Council of Trent. As a temporal prince, he also strove to find a balance of power with the nearby Habsburg preponderant presence. In 1620, he moved to Rome, managing to obtain the title of vicar bishop for his nephew and assistant Carlo Emanuele.

He died in Rome in 1629. He was succeeded by his nephew.

== See also ==
- Carlo Emanuele Madruzzo
- Cristoforo Madruzzo

Catholic Church titles
Preceded by Ludovico Madruzzo	Prince-Bishop of Trento; 1600–1629	Succeeded by Carlo Emanuele Madruzzo
