= Ernst Adalbert of Harrach =

Austrian Catholic Cardinal

His Eminence Ernst Adalbert von Harrach O.Cr.
- Archbishop of Prague
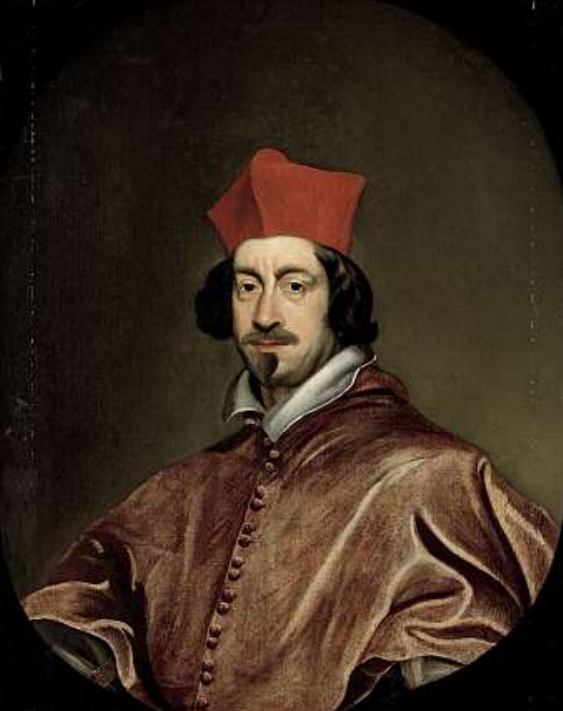
- Church: Catholic Church
- Archdiocese: Prague
- Appointed: 6 January 1623
- Term ended: 25 October 1667
- Predecessor: Johann Lohel
- Successor: Matouš Sobek von Bílenberk
- Other posts: Prince-Bishop of Trent (1665-1667); Cardinal-Priest of San Lorenzo in Lucina (1667)
- Previous posts: Cardinal-Priest of Santa Maria degli Angeli e dei Martiri (1632–1667)

Orders
- Created cardinal: 19 January 1626 by Pope Urban VIII
- Rank: Cardinal-Priest

Personal details
- Born: 4 November 1598 Vienna, Austria
- Died: 25 October 1667 (aged 68) Vienna, Austria
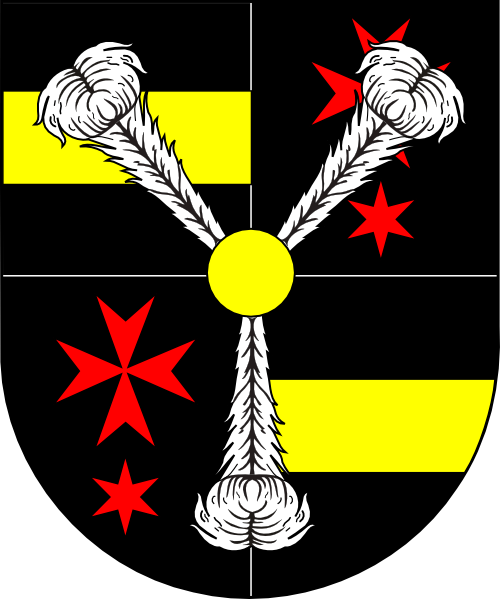
- Coat of arms

Count Ernst Adalbert of Harrach (German: Ernst Adalbert von Harrach; Czech: Arnošt Vojtěch hrabě z Harrachu; 4 November 1598 – 25 October 1667) was an Austrian Catholic Cardinal who was appointed Archbishop of Prague and Prince-Bishop of Trento.

== Life ==
=== Early life ===
Ernst Adalbert of Harrach was born 4 November 1598 in Vienna, Archduchy of Austria, Holy Roman Empire as the son of Count Karl von Harrach and Maria Elisabeth von Schrattenbach. He was educated by Nikolaus Walther and was later, thanks to his family's connection to Italian aristocratic families including the Borghese and Barberini, admitted to the Collegio Teutonico in 1616.

In 1621 he was ordained a priest at age 22. He became Archbishop of Prague in 1623.

=== As primate to the Kingdom of Bohemia ===
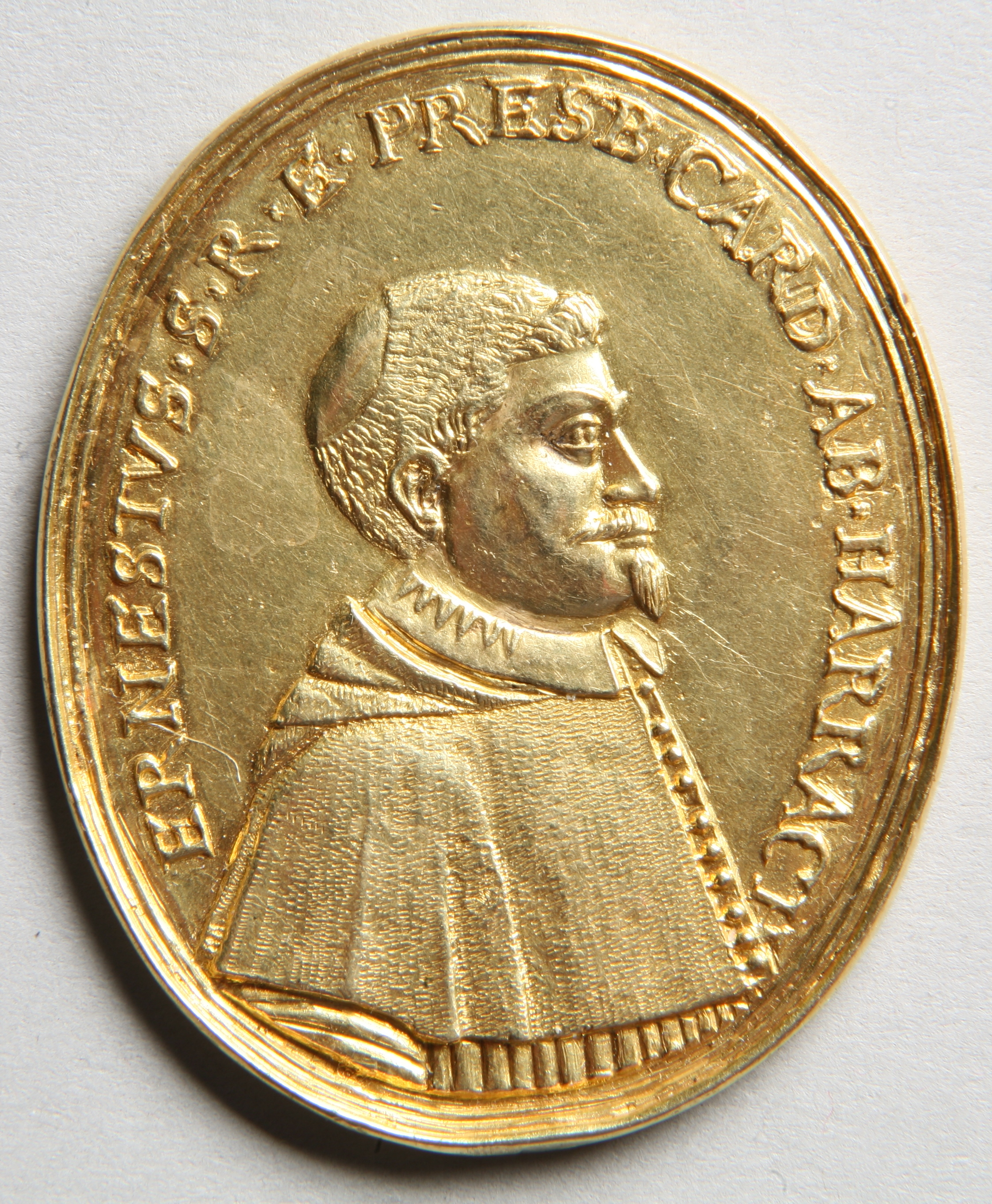
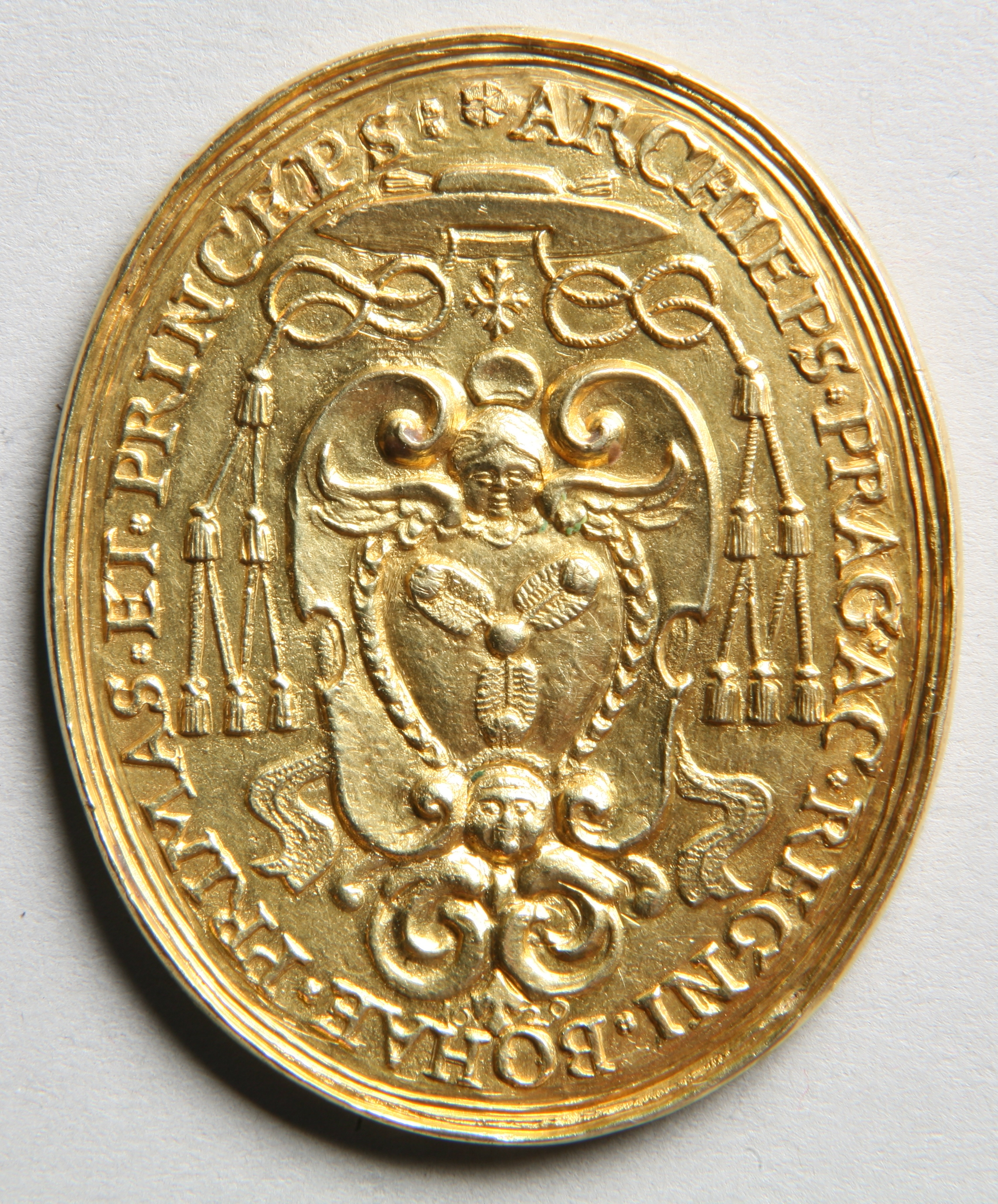
The face and reverse of a medal struck for Adalbert von Harrach in 1629

Adalbert von Harrach was arrested at his palace when the Swedish took over a section of Prague in the precursor conflict to the Battle of Prague and lost a significant part of his wealth. He was eventually released after intercession by cardinal Jules Mazarin before Queen Christina of Sweden, with 15,000 écus and a letter written by him promising not to take revenge for Adalbert von Harrach's losses.

He visited Rome rarely; so much so that when he did in 1643, Pope Urban VIII is said to have considered it a bad omen (as the cardinal would only otherwise have visited had the pope died, requiring a papal conclave).

Catholic Church titles
| Preceded by Johann Lohel | Archbishop of Prague; 1623–1667 | Succeeded by Jan Vilém Vojtěch Count Liebsteinský of Kolowrat |
| Preceded by Sigismund Francis, Archduke of Austria | Prince-Bishop of Trento; 1665–1667 | Succeeded by Sigismund Alfons von Thun |
