= Bernardo Clesio =

His Eminence Bernardo Clesio
- Cardinal, Bishop of Trento
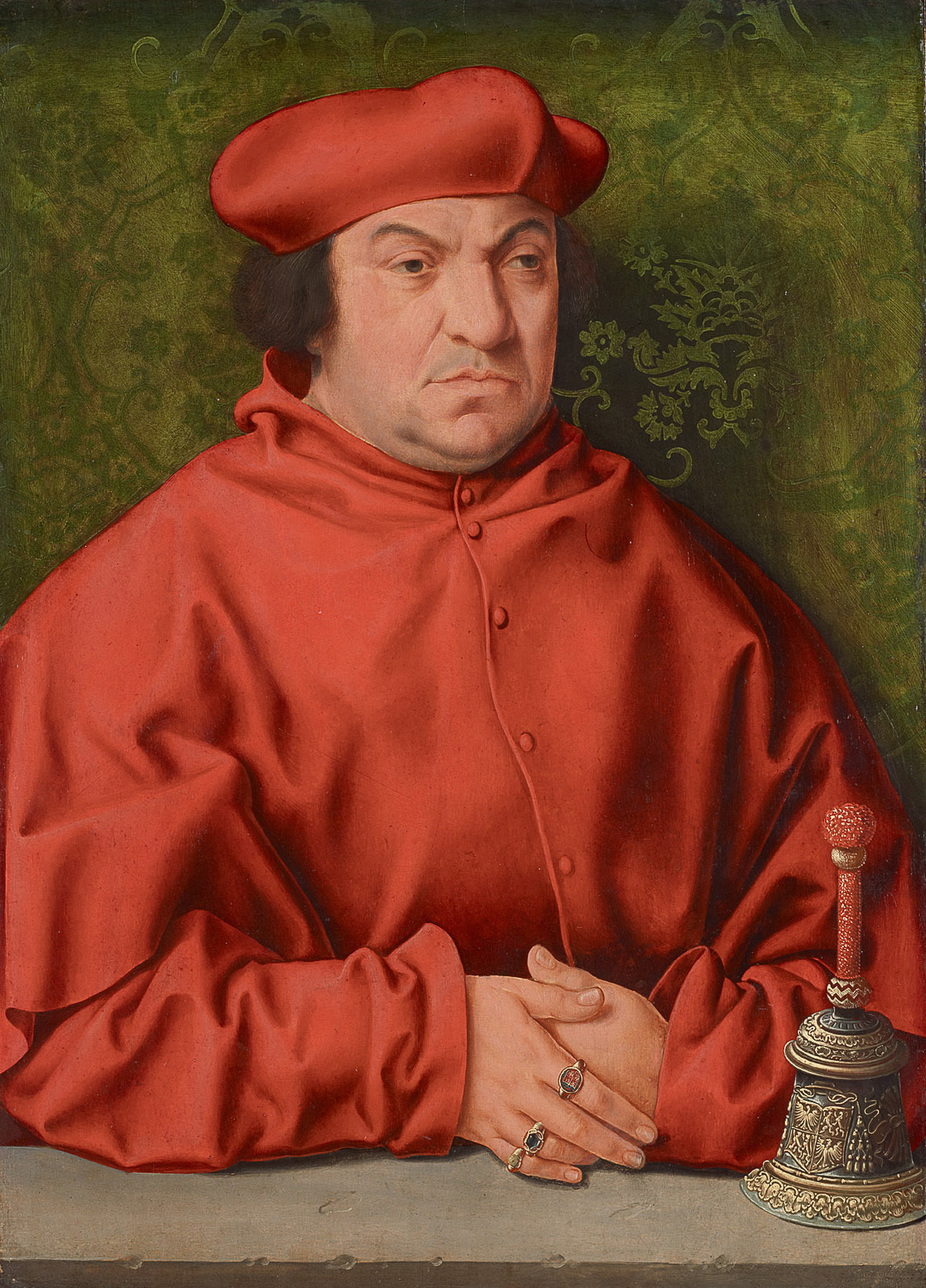
- Portrait by Barthel Bruyn the Elder
- Church: Roman Catholic Church
- Installed: 1514
- Term ended: 1539
- Predecessor: George II von Neideck
- Successor: Cristoforo Madruzzo
- Other post: Cardinal-priest of Santo Stefano al Monte Celio

Orders
- Ordination: 8 September 1515
- Consecration: 10 December 1515 by Michele Iorba
- Created cardinal: 9 March 1530 by Clement VII
- Rank: Cardinal-priest

Personal details
- Born: 11 March 1484 Cles, Prince-Bishopric of Trent
- Died: 30 July 1539 (aged 55) Brixen

Bernardo Clesio (German: Bernhard von Cles; 1 March 1484 – 30 July 1539) was an Italian Cardinal, bishop, diplomat, humanist and botanist.

== Biography ==
Born in Cles, in the Prince-Bishopric of Trent, today Trentino, he graduated from the University of Bologna. He later became Prince-Bishop of Trent (1514–1539) and of Brixen (1539), cardinal, and chancellor of Holy Roman Emperor Ferdinand I.

He was a key contributor to the organization of the Council of Trent and greatly embellished and expanded Trento in the process. He commissioned the rebuilding of the Church of Santa Maria Maggiore, Trento, enlarged the Castello del Buonconsiglio and called upon Renaissance artists such as Dosso Dossi and Romanino to decorated the additions.

Catholic Church titles
Preceded by George II von Neideck	Bishop of Trento; 1514–1539	Succeeded by Cristoforo Madruzzo
Preceded by George of Austria	Bishop of Brixen; 1539	Succeeded by Christoph Fuchs von Fuchsberg
