= Carlo Emanuele Madruzzo =

Italian prince-bishop (1599–1648)

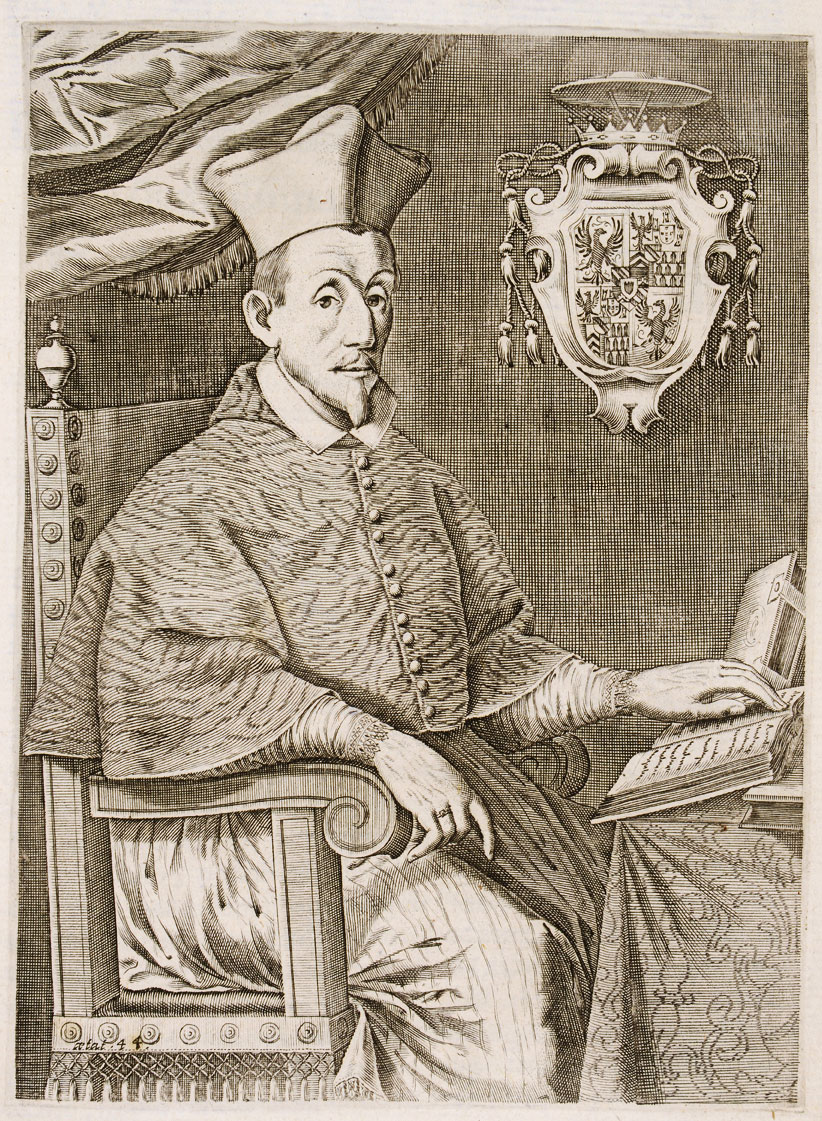
Carlo Emanuele Madruzzo

Carlo Emanuele Madruzzo or Charles-Emmanuel de Madrus in French (5 November 1599 – 15 December 1658) was the prince-bishop of Trento in northern Italy from January 1629 until his death.

== Biography ==
Charles-Emmanuel de Madruce was born at the Castle of Issogne into the noble family of the Madruzzo, various members of which were also prince-bishops of Trento.

In his youth, he studied grammar and rhetoric in Munich and philosophy at Ingolstadt in Jesuit schools. Later, he moved to Perugia where he studied law. In 1619, he was called back to Trento, where his uncle, Cardinal Carlo Gaudenzio Madruzzo, had chosen him as his assistant and successor as prince-bishop. In 1627, he took the vows.

After obtaining the throne in Trento, he had to face a period of crisis caused by the Thirty Years' War and by the tense relations between the Holy Roman Emperor and the Papacy. During his rule, he was able to obtain a wider degree of freedom from the House of Habsburg. In 1631, he ominously fled the city, which had been struck by plague; Madruzzo attracted further criticism for his relationship with a noblewoman, Claudia Particella. He repeatedly asked for a papal dispensation in order to be able to marry her and legitimize their children.

He died suddenly at Trento in December 1658.

== See also ==
- Ludovico Madruzzo
- Cristoforo Madruzzo

Catholic Church titles
Preceded by Carlo Gaudenzio Madruzzo	Prince-Bishop of Trento; 1629-1658	Succeeded by Sigismund Francis, Archduke of Austria
