= Federico Wanga =

Prince-Bishop of Trento

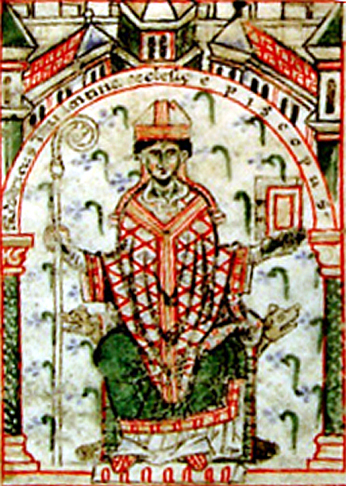
Federico Vanga

Federico Vanga (or Wanga; German: Friedrich von Wangen; died 1218) was Prince-Bishop of Trento from August 9, 1207, until his death.

He was born in the noble family of the Lords of Wangen, a hamlet on the Ritten near Bolzano. As bishop, he founded several hospitals and had a defensive tower (Torre Vanga) built on the Adige in Trento. He also began the works for the city's cathedral. He also issued a code of laws (Codex Wangianus).

He died while taking part in the Fifth Crusade.

Preceded by Conrad II di Biseno; Until 1205	Bishop of Trento; 1207–1218	Succeeded by Albert IV von Ravenstein
