= Cristoforo Madruzzo =

Italian Roman Catholic cardinal and statesman

His Eminence Cristoforo Madruzzo
- Prince-Bishop of Brexin
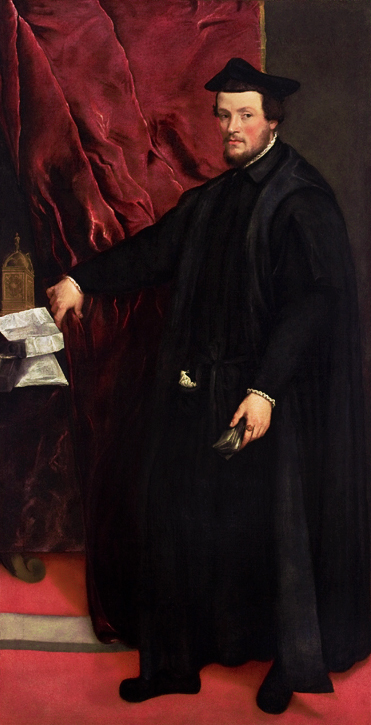
- Portrait of Cristoforo Madruzzo by Titian (1552). Museu de Arte de São Paulo, São Paulo.
- Church: Catholic Church
- Appointed: 11 December 1542
- Term ended: 5 July 1578
- Predecessor: Christoph Fuchs von Fuchsberg
- Successor: Johann Thomas von Spaur
- Other posts: Cardinal-Bishop of Porto–Santa Rufina (1570-1578)
- Previous posts: See list: Prince-Bishop of Trent (1539–1567); Cardinal-Bishop of Palestrina (1564-1570)

Orders
- Ordination: 1542
- Consecration: 28 May 1542 by Christoph Fuchs von Fuchsberg
- Created cardinal: 2 June 1542 by Pope Paul III
- Rank: Cardinal-Bishop

Personal details
- Born: 5 July 1512 Calavino, Italy
- Died: 5 July 1578 (aged 66) Tivoli, Italy
- Buried: Sant'Onofrio
- Coat of arms

Cristoforo Madruzzo ([kriˈstɔːforo maˈdruttso]) (5 July 1512 – 5 July 1578) was an Italian Roman Catholic cardinal and statesman. His brother Eriprando was a mercenary captain who fought in the Italian Wars.

== Biography ==
Madruzzo was born on 5 July 1512 at Calavino, into a noble family in Trento. He studied at Padua and Bologna, received in 1529 from his older brother a canonicate at Trento and the parish of Tirol near Meran, was in 1536 a Canon of Salzburg, in 1537 of Brixen, and in 1539 became Prince-Bishop of Trento. Being only a subdeacon at the time, he was promoted to the deaconship, priesthood and episcopate in 1542.

In December 1542, he was appointed administrator of the Bishopric of Brixen, and shortly afterwards, during the same year, he was raised to the dignity of a cardinal by Pope Paul III. Having resigned his bishopric at Trento in 1567 in favour of his nephew Ludovico, he spent the latter years of his life in Italy, and became Cardinal Bishop successively of Sabina, Palestrina, and Porto. A few years after his death, his remains were entombed in the family chapel, in the church of Sant'Onofrio, Rome.

Charles V and his brother, King Ferdinand I, afterwards emperor, esteemed him very highly and employed him in many important and delicate missions. He took an active part in the imperial Diet of Ratisbon as representative of the emperor, and strenuously upheld the Catholic teaching against the heresy of Martin Luther.

Madruzzo was also governor of Milan for 20 months.

In addition to his two sees he received in 1546, by the favour of Charles V, a yearly allowance of 2,000 ducats from the Roman Catholic Archdiocese of Santiago de Compostela in Spain.

He died in Tivoli, Italy, on 5 July 1578, his 66th birthday.

=== Council of Trent ===
As cardinal, Bishop of Trent, and temporal ruler of that principality, he played a prominent part in the Council of Trent. Among other things, he insisted that the reform of the Church should be taken up in earnest, a matter much desired by Charles V, and by which it was hoped to win the Protestants back to the Church. It was largely due to his efforts that this subject was discussed and enactments of that character were passed in each session, together with decisions on doctrinal matters. During the Council, he opposed Cardinal Pacheco and others who wanted to ban all vernacular translations of the Bible. He was also intent upon promoting a truly religious and Christian life among both the people and the ecclesiastics under his jurisdiction. He was himself cultured and learned, and patronized the liberal arts and learning.

== See also ==
- Carlo Emanuele Madruzzo
- Carlo Gaudenzio Madruzzo

== Sources ==
- Catholic Encyclopedia

Catholic Church titles
Preceded by Christoph Fuchs von Fuchsberg	Bishop of Brixen; 1542–1578	Succeeded by Johann Thomas von Spaur
Preceded by Bernardo III Clesio	Bishop of Trento; 1539–1567	Succeeded by Ludovico Madruzzo
Political offices
Preceded by Fernando Álvarez de Toledo	Governor of Milan; 1556–1557	Succeeded by Gonzalo de Córdoba
