= Prince-Bishopric of Trent =

Imperial estate of the Holy Roman Empire in present-day northern Italy (1027-1803)

Coordinates: 46.0674°N 11.1214°E

Prince-Bishopric of Trent Principato Vescovile di Trento (Italian) Hochstift Trient (German) Episcopatus ac Principatus Tridentinus (Latin)
- 1027–1803
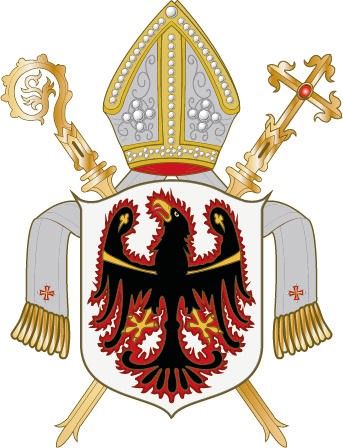
- Flag from 1801 to 1802 Coat of arms

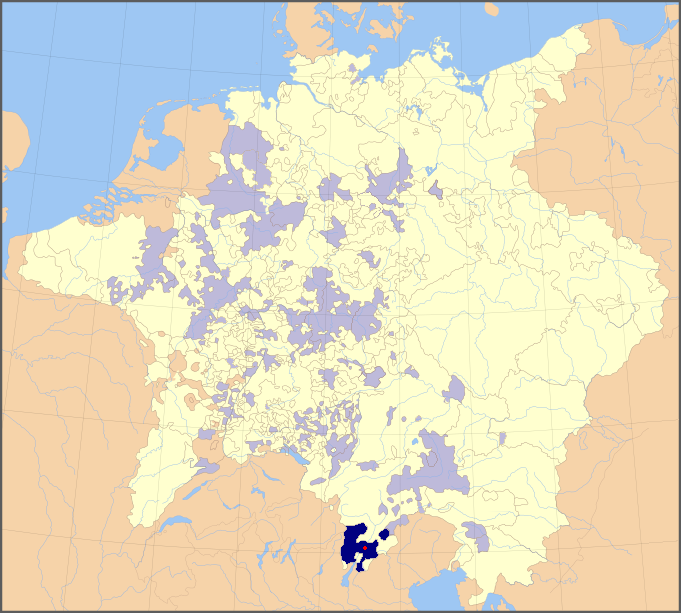
- Bishopric of Trent within the Holy Roman Empire in 1648; Ecclesiastical lands shaded in pale blue
- Status: Prince-Bishopric
- Capital: Trent
- Common languages: Latin, Italian, German, Ladin
- Religion: Roman Catholicism
- Prince-bishop
  - 1027–1055: Udalrico II
  - 1800–1803: Emanuele Maria Thun
- Historical era: Middle Ages; Early modern period
  - Separated from Verona by Conrad II: 1027
  - Bishops deposed by Frederick II: 1236
  - Declared a commune: 1425
  - Council of Trent: 1545–1563
  - Napoleonic invasion: 1796
  - Secularised to Tyrol: 1803
  - Dissolution of the Holy Roman Empire: 6 August 1806
| Preceded by | Succeeded by |
| March of Verona | County of Tyrol |

The Prince-Bishopric of Trent (Latin: Episcopatus ac Principatus Tridentinus; German: Hochstift Trient, Fürstbistum Trient, Bistum Trient) was an ecclesiastical principality roughly corresponding to the present-day Northern Italian autonomous province of Trentino. It was created in 1027 and existed until 1803, when it was secularised and absorbed into the County of Tyrol held by the House of Habsburg. Trent was a Hochstift, an Imperial State under the authority of a prince-bishop at Trento.

== History ==
=== Middle Ages ===
A first Bishop of Trent is recorded as a participant of the synod at Aquileia in 381. The area was part of the Lombard Kingdom and the Kingdom of Italy, until the 951 campaign of German king Otto I against King Berengar II of Italy. In 952 Berengar had to cede the March of Verona to Otto, who enfeoffed his younger brother Duke Henry I of Bavaria.

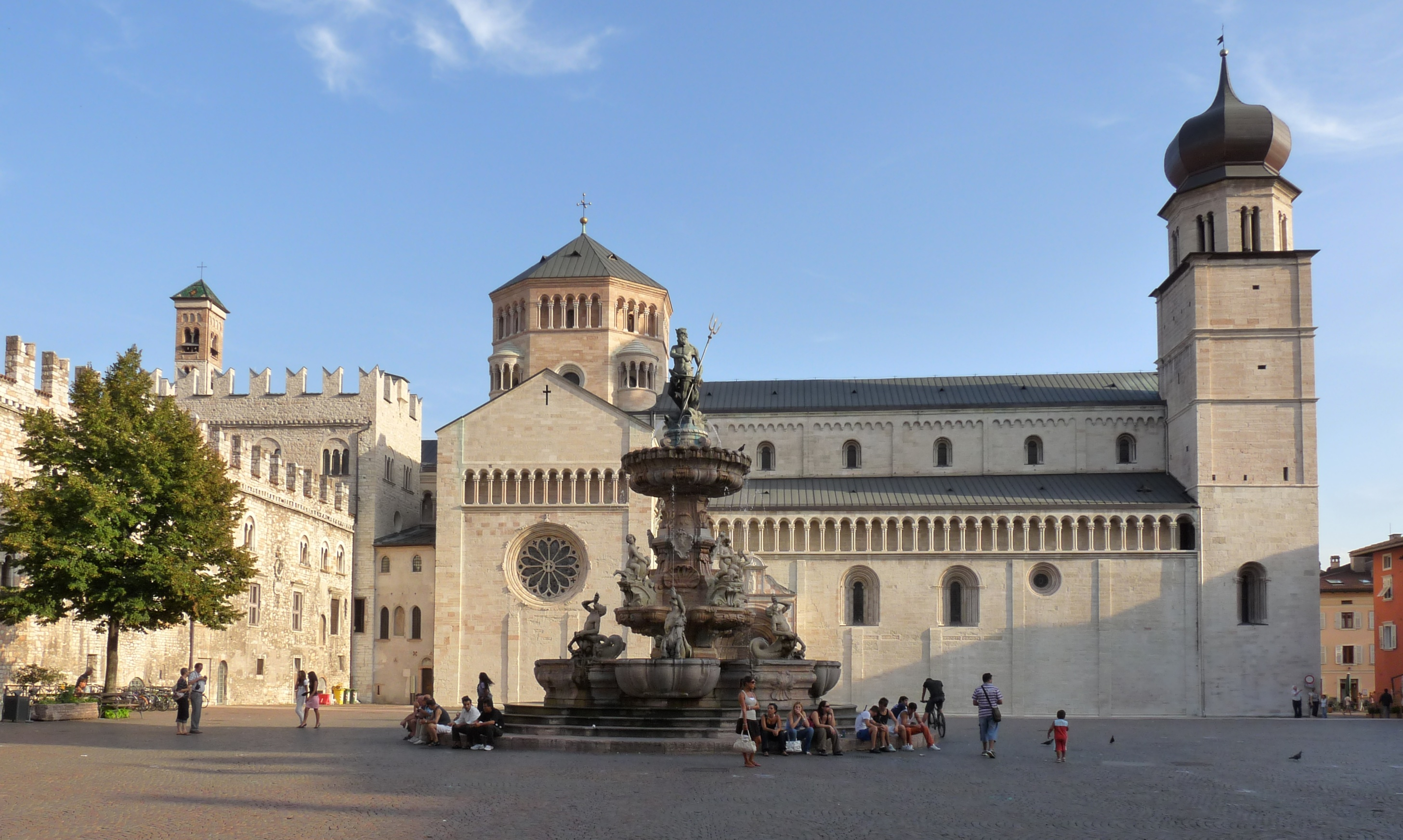
Trento Cathedral

From 1004 Emperor Henry II the Saint and his successor Conrad II separated several smaller territories in the northeast of the Veronese march and granted them to the Trient diocese. Originally a Bavarian fief, by 1027 the prince-bishopric was established by Conrad II, together with the similar Prince-Bishopric of Brixen. The states were created to favor passage to Imperial armies across the Alps towards Italy along the two ancient roads, the Via Claudia-Augusta and the Via Altinate, entrusting the area to two bishops instead of often rebellious lay princes.

The prince-bishops were true Holy Roman Empire princes, and enjoyed the right to take part to Imperial diets. The princes of Trento maintained a strong allegiance to the Emperor, even when the latter was excommunicated: this because they need his protection against the growing power of subjects like the counts of Tyrol, who controlled the area around Bozen, those of Eppan, and others. In one of the attempts to reassure his temporal authority over these lesser but fierce nobles, the bishop Adelpreto was slaughtered at Arco, on 20 September 1172, by the lords of Castelbarco. The supremacy of the prince-bishops of Trento and Brixen were however re-established by Emperor Frederick Barbarossa in 1179 and again by his son Henry VI of Hohenstaufen. The bishop earned the right to have a coin of his own and to impose tolls.

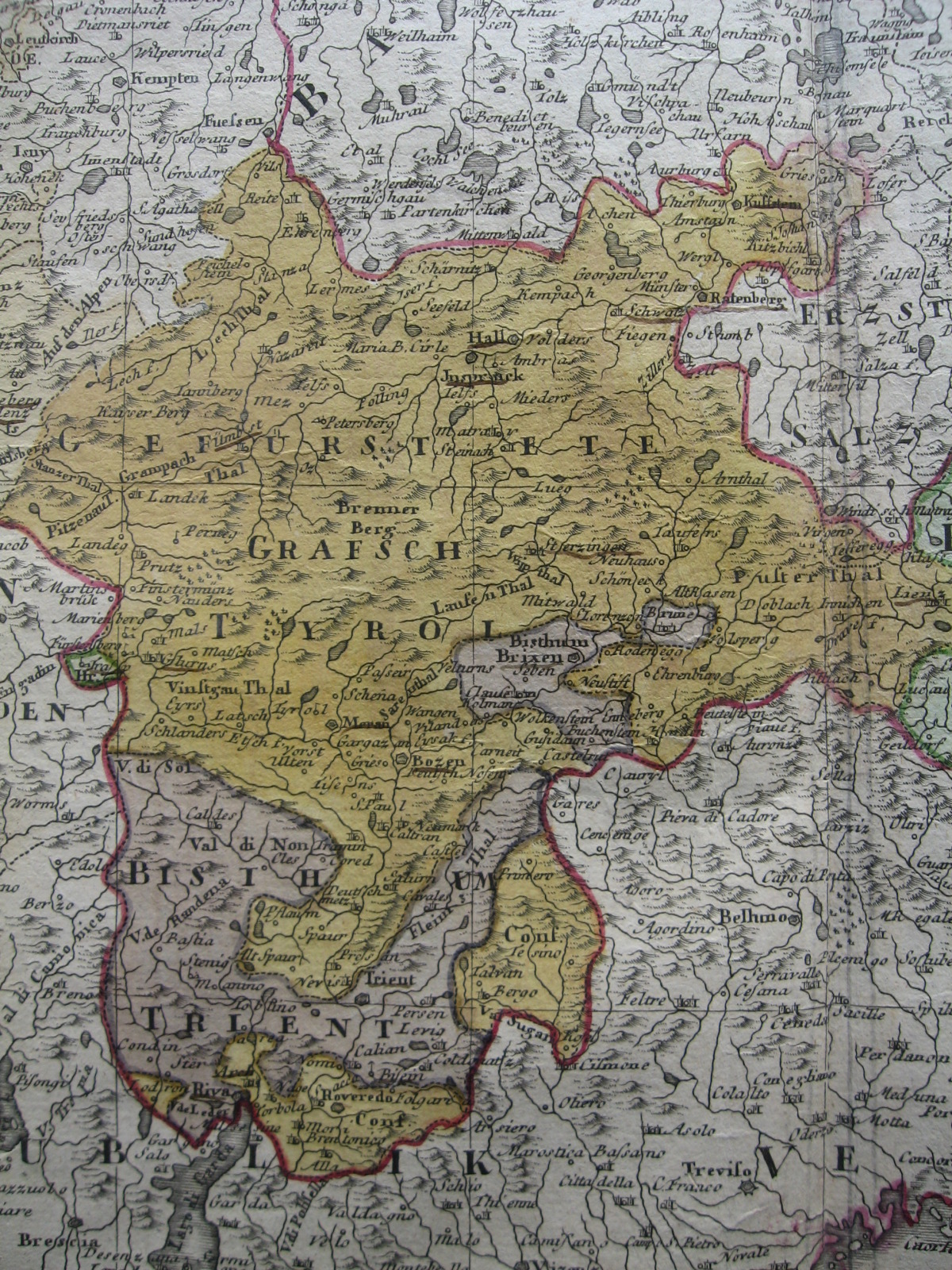
The Bishoprics of Trent and Brixen interwoven with the Habsburg County of Tyrol, 18th century

The principate was reorganized and reformed by bishop Federico Wanga (1207–18), a relative of Emperor Otto IV. Allied with the Bishop of Brixen and allowing wide estates to the Teutonic Knights he managed to thwart at all the nobles' strength, and recovered much of the territories lost in the past years. In order to state in a definitive way his authority he also collected all the official documents certificating the bishop's authority in the so-called Book of St Vigilius (Codex Wangianus), Vigilius being the patron saint of Trento. Moreover, Federico supported trading over the Adige way across the Alps, and made concessions to the middle class. The drying of the valley allowed the area to become one of the most renowned of Italy for the production of wine. The statute issued by Federico on 19 June 1208 is considered the most ancient official document concerning the Alps mining industry. The city was encircled with a new line of walls and towers, and the building of the Cathedral was commenced.

The death of Wanga in the Holy Land, during a Crusade, stopped his reforms. In 1236 Emperor Frederick II of Hohenstaufen deposed the bishops and ensured to himself the authority over the important military area of Trento, annexing it to the Mark of Treviso — the administration was entrusted to his faithful friend, Ezzelino III da Romano at Verona.

In the 13th century the Counts of Tyrol took advantage of the confused situation to carve out a conspicuous power as a Vogt for himself, much at the loss of the Bishops of Chur, Brixen, the Archbishopric of Salzburg and Trento itself. Count Meinhard II of Tyrol (1258–1295), also Duke of Carinthia from 1286, totally subjected the bishops of Trento and Brixen under his power, and reorganized his new state along the more modern lines inspired to those of other Italian principalities. In the 14th century, during the disputes between the rival emperors Charles IV of Luxembourg and Louis IV of Wittelsbach, the principality suffered several destructions and was temporarily again annexed to the latter's Bavarian territories. The threat by Tyrol increased, when in 1363 Countess Margaret Maultasch ceded her lands to Rudolf IV of Austria from the mighty House of Habsburg.

=== 15th and 16th centuries ===
In 1419 the bishop George I of Liechtenstein (1390–1419) escaped the subjugation to Tyrol submitting directly to the emperor, but this did not prevent the bishops to lose further authority over the city and the countryside in the course of the 15th century, even though an attempt by the citizens to create a republic in 1407 was bloodily suppressed. In 1425 Trento was declared a commune. Another revolt broke out ten years later, and Austro-Tyrolese troops invaded the territory of the principality. In the following year, the bishops struggled in order to thwart the growing power of the Habsburgs, and in the end the principality reduced to an effective subjugation to Austrian authority.

In June 1511 the two principalities of Trento and Brixen received the status of "perpetual confederate" states among Austrian possessions. The peace of 1516 with the Republic of Venice, however, reduced the principality to a discontinuous enclave between large Habsburg possessions. During the war against Venice, in 1509, the territory had been ravaged by Landsknechts returning from a failed expedition against Vicenza. This was followed by pestilences in 1510 and 1512, famines in 1512, 1519 and 1520, and an earthquake in 1521: these grievous happenings spurred the beginning of forms of resistance against Habsburg rule. A true rebellion broke out in 1525, called Bauernkrieg or "contadine revolt". The rebellers were led by Michael Gaismayr, who had devised a complex plan of liberation of all the territories of Brixen and Trento and program of social freedom based on egalitarian principles (Landesordnung).

The rebels, however, lacked organisation and were easily suppressed in 1526 by Austrian mercenaries and by the bishop Bernardo Clesio, who ferociously exterminated them in the battles of the Eisack valley and Sterzing. The rebellion leaders were beheaded, hanged or mutilated, while the simple followers were released but with a "mark of infamy" impressed on their brow. Any dream of further revolt ended when Gasmayr was murdered by the archduke's killer in Padua in 1532. Some thousand of Tyrolese and Trentine rebels took shelter in Moravia, near Auspitz, where they established "fraternal farms" (Bruderhöfe).

Bishop Cardinal Bernardo Clesio is considered the true refounder (Neubegründer) of the authority of the princes of Trento. An adviser of emperor Maximilian I of Habsburg and a friend of Erasmus of Rotterdam, he played an important role in the election of Emperor Charles V of Habsburg at Frankfurt in 1519, and in that of his brother Ferdinand I as King of Bohemia in 1526. His personal charisma reverted the subalterne status of the Trento state between the Habsburg territories, gaining the seignory of Castelbarco and Rovereto. His statute of the city, issued in 1528, remained in use until 1807. Under Clesio's rule Trento was renovated with a new urbanistic asset, and a new great church, S. Maria Maggiore: these were needed in order to host the important and influential Council of Trent (1545–63), and, after the sudden death of Clesio in 1539, were completed by his successor, cardinal Cristoforo Madruzzo. Also the economy and services were greatly improved. The presence of famous intellectual and scholars during the Council, spurred the diffusion of Renaissance in the principality. The introduction of the Counter-Reformation in the principality brought also a general recover of the Italian language over the German one, as the Protestant ideas had found more followers in the German-speaking population.

This "Golden Age", however, was ended by Emperor Ferdinand I, who invaded the Trentine territories, occupying Rovereto and, in 1567, declaring the Confederation Treaty over. The dispute was settled only in 1578, when the Imperial Diet reinstated the prince-bishops' suzerainty.

=== Modern Age ===
Flag of the Prince-Bishopric of Trent prior to Napoleon's invasion

In the 17th century the principality suffered the economic consequences of the Thirty Years' War and the decline of Venetian trade. The principality was held by the Madruzzo family (who also indirectly controlled Brixen) until 1658, with the death of Carlo Emanuele. Emperor Leopold I of Habsburg assigned therefore the principality to his cousin Archduke Sigismund Francis, regent of Tyrol and Further Austria. Relationships with the Austrian Empire were again settled in 1662. Three years later, however, Sigismund Francis died and the principality was included in the Habsburg emperors' direct dominions. This however did not mean the loss of his semi-independent status, and several outstanding results were obtained anyway — the balance active of 1683, the completion of the Castello del Buonconsiglio in Trento, and the drying of the marshes in the Adige valley. Rice cultivation was introduced in the lands obtained.

The situation worsened at the beginning of the 18th century, when the Trentino and the Tyrol were invaded by French and Bavarian armies, and Trento itself was bombed for six days in September 1703. But the most dangerous menace to the principality status were the claims of emperor Charles VI of Habsburg to reunite under the Habsburg crown all the hereditary territories of his house. The bishops continued their struggle for independence against the growing Austrian prominence, until Napoleon's invasion of 1796.

== Aftermath ==
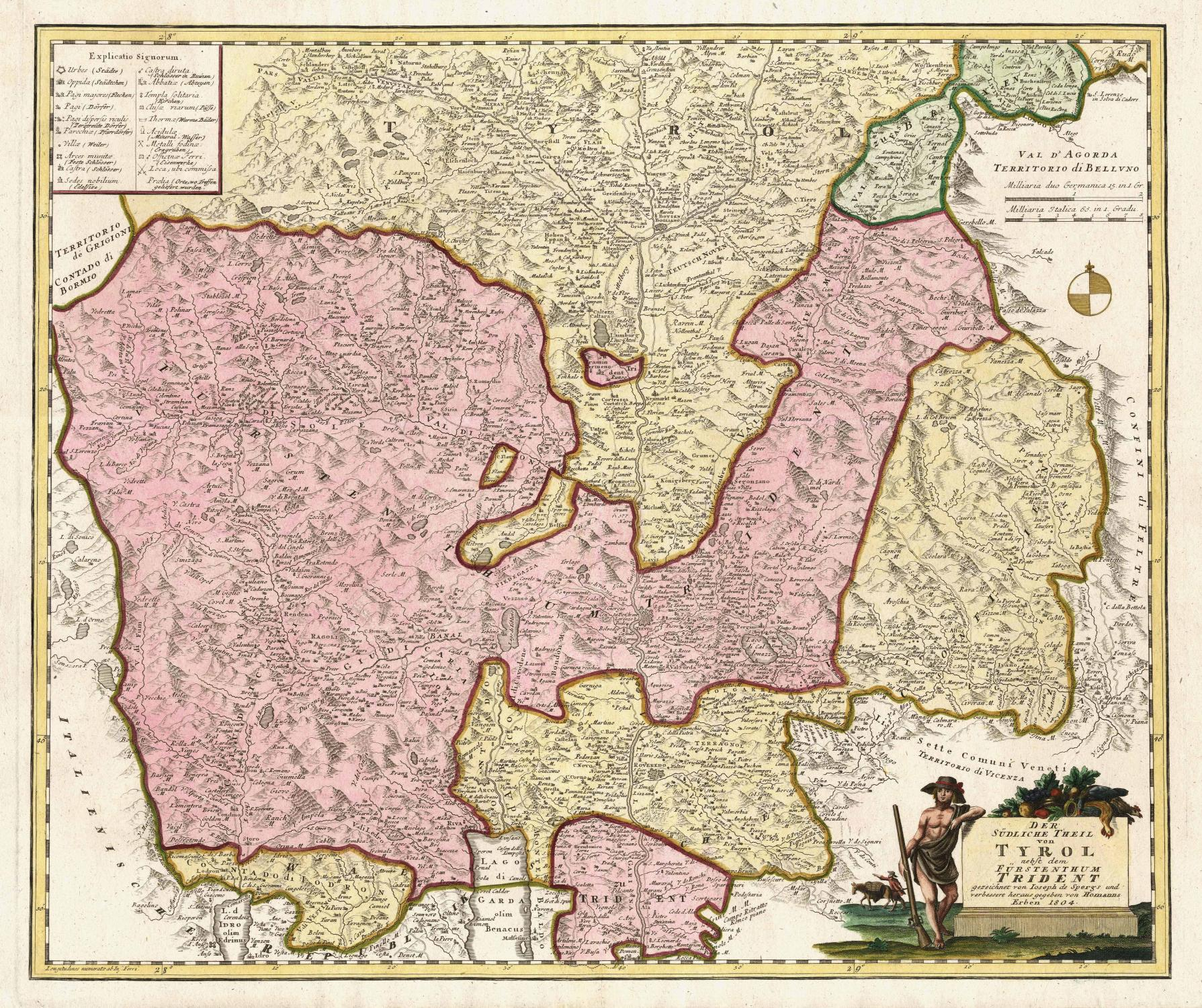
The Principality of Trent (in pink) in 1804

Following the 1801 Treaty of Lunéville, the prince-bishopric in 1803 was secularized as the Principality of Trent, later part of the County of Tyrol, an Alpine crown land of the Austrian Empire from 1804. With Tyrol it was annexed by the Kingdom of Bavaria according to the 1805 Peace of Pressburg, passed to the Napoleonic Kingdom of Italy in 1810 and in 1814 was again incorporated into the Austrian crown land of Tyrol.

Due to its predominantly Italian speaking population, the Trentino (Venezia Tridentina) was claimed by the Italian irredentism movement. It however remained a part of the Tyrolean crown land (Welschtirol), even after Austria had to cede the adjacent Veneto region after the Third Italian War of Independence in 1866. According to the 1919 Treaty of Saint-Germain the territory of the former Trent bishopric together with the southern part of the original County of Tyrol fell to the Kingdom of Italy.

== List of prince-bishops ==
| Name | Period |
|---|---|
| Ulrich II | 1027–1055 (bishop from 1022) |
| Azzo | 1055–1065 |
| vacant | |
| Henry I | 1068–1082 |
| Bernard II | 1082–1084 |
| Adalbero | 1084–1106 |
| Gebhard | 1106–1120 |
| Albert I | 1120–1124 |
| Altmann | 1124–1149 |
| Arnold II | 1149–1154 |
| Eberhard | 1154–1156 |
| St. Albert II | 1156–1177 |
| Salomon | 1177–1183 |
| Albert III di Madruzzo | 1184–1188 |
| Conrad II di Beseno | 1188–1205 |
vacant
| Federico Wanga | 1207–1218 |
| Albert IV von Ravenstein | 1219–1223 |
| Gerard I Oscasali | 1223–1232 |
| Aldrighetto di Castelcampo | 1232–1247 |
| Egno von Eppan | 1250–1273 |
| Henry II | 1273–1289 |
| Philipp Buonacolsi | 1289–1303 |
| Bartholomew Querini | 1303–1307 |
| Henry III von Metz | 1310–1336 |
| Nikolaus Abrein | 1338–1347 |
| Gerard II of Magnoco | 1347–1348 |
| John III of Pistoia | 1348–1349 |
| Meinhard von Neuhaus | 1349–1362 |
| Albert V von Ortenburg | 1363–1390 |
| George I von Liechtenstein | 1390–1419 |
| Armand de Cilli | 1421 |
| Ernst Auer | 1422 |
| Henry IV Flechtel | 1422–1423 |
| Alexander of Masovia | 1424–1444 |
| Benedikt | 1444–1446 |
| Theobald von Wolkenstein | 1444–1446 (Anti-Bishop) |
| George II Haak von Themeswald | 1446–1465 |
| Johannes Hinderbach | 1465–1486 |
| Ulrich III von Frundsberg | 1486–1493 |
| Ulrich IV von Liechtenstein | 1493–1505 |
| George II von Neideck | 1505–1514 |
| Bernardo III Clesio | 1514–1539 |
| Cristoforo Madruzzo | 1539–1567 |
| Ludovico Madruzzo | 1567–1600 |
| Carlo Gaudenzio Madruzzo | 1600–1629 |
| Carlo Emanuele Madruzzo | 1629–1658 |
| Sigismund Francis of Austria | 1659–1665 |
| Ernst Adalbert von Harrach | 1665–1667 |
| Sigismund Alfons von Thun | 1668–1677 |
| Francesco Alberti di Pola | 1677–1689 |
| Giuseppe Vittorio Alberti di Enno | 1689–1695 |
| Johann Michael Graf von Spaur | 7 March 1696 - 22 April 1725 |
| Giovanni Benedetto Gentilotti | 9 September 1725 - 20 September 1725 |
| Anton Dominik Graf von Wolkenstein | 26 November 1725 - 5 April 1730 |
| Dominik Anton Graf von Thun | 19 June 1730 - 7 September 1758 |
| Leopold Ernest Graf von Firmian | 1748 - 7 September (?) 1758 |
| Francesco Felice Alberti di Enno | 7 September (?) 1758 - 31 December 1762 |
| Cristoforo Francesco Sizzo de Norris | 2 July 1763 - 1776 |
| Peter Michael Vigil Graf von Thun und Hohenstein | 29 May 1776 - 17 January 1800 |
| Emmanuel Maria Graf von Thun und Hohenstein | 2 April 1800 - 6 November 1802 (continued as a secularized prince until February 1803) |
