= Civezzano fortified complex =

Fortification near Trento, Italy

The Civezzano Fortified Complex is an Austro-Hungarian fortification built to the East of the Northern Italian city of Trento. Built between 1868 and 1876, it was part of the second group of fortifications built around Trento.

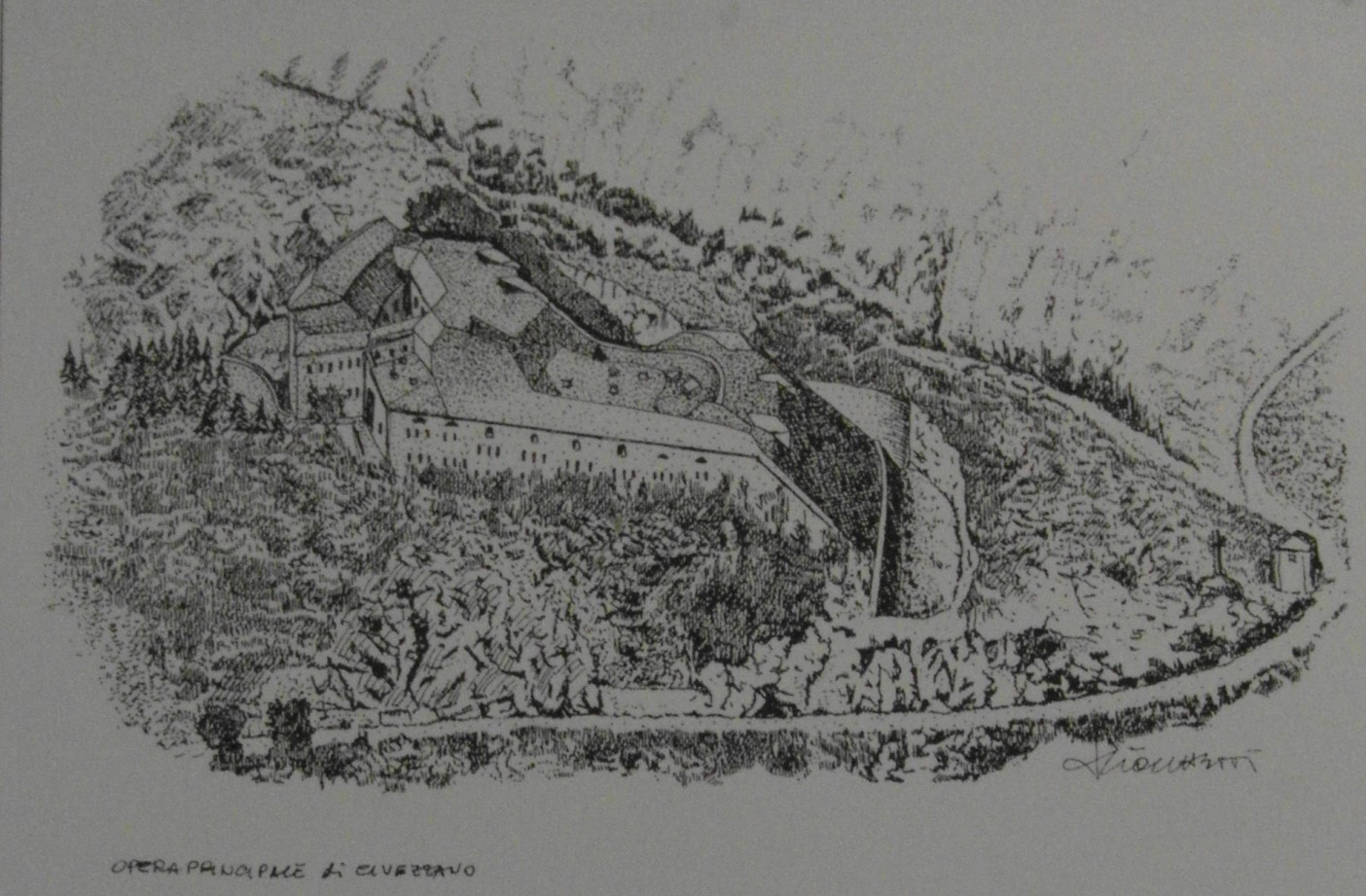
An aerial sketch of Civezzano Alto before it was destroyed in 1915.

Civezzano Alto “Fort Proper”

Civezzano Alto was built between 1868 and 1876 to guard the Northern Italian city of Trento from an attack from the east. Alto was built vertically into the mountain because of the lack of flat space, and was built with 2 levels and had minimum gun ports on each level. The fort was built on top of a Roman castle, which was built upon during the middle ages, becoming a real castle until it was destroyed in 1254. The fort was armed with 5 15cm M61 fortress guns, and 3 12cm howitzers. The fort was surrounded by a ditch on the front and left sides, in addition to a heavy concentration of barbed wire. The wartime garrison was estimated to be 3 officers and 138 enlisted men. By 1915, the Austrians destroyed the fort and its armament moved elsewhere.

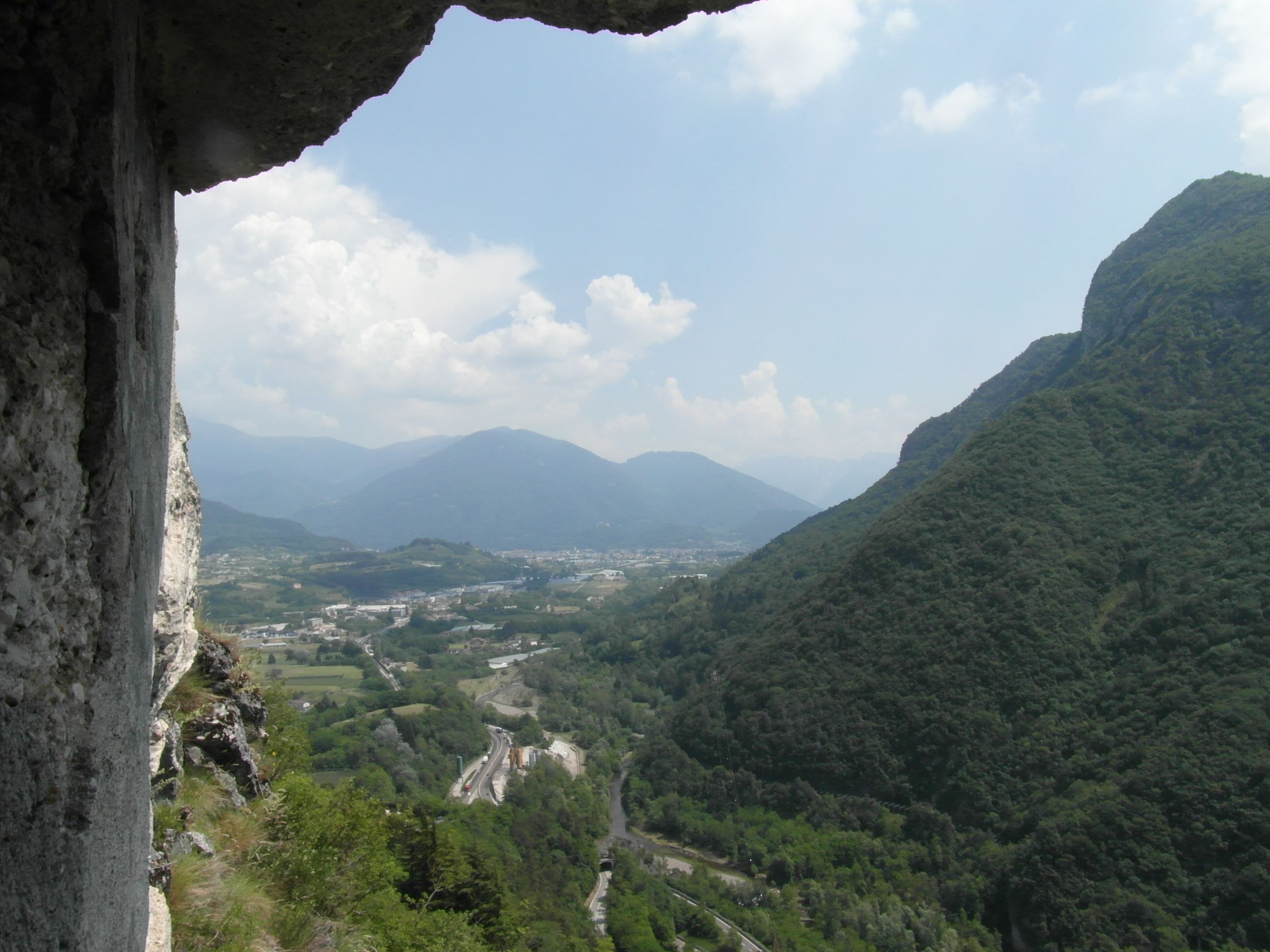
The view from one of Civezzano's gun ports, the road and the Fersina Gorge are in the center foreground.

== Upper road block ==
The upper road block is a single-story masonry structure now located on the road from Civezzano to Cognola. Since the Upper roadblock was built between 1868 and 1872, Upper was part of the second round of fortifications built around Trento. The fort was renovated in 1914, just before World War I. The works consisted of a battery of cannons built into casemates surrounded by dry ditches with rifle loopholes covering the road, ditches, and the entrance to the fort. The upper road block's main armament was far more modest that the fort proper, it consisted of 2 12cm M61 fortress cannons, all facing towards Pergine. In times of war the fort's complement would be 48 enlisted men. The upper road block was connected to the lower road block by a trench. Upper is the only fortification that shows the transition between the conventional 1800s fortification and the heavily armed and armored fort of the "Vogl" style. After World War I, the fort was used as a powder keg until 1956, when it was sold to the Municipality of Civezzano, and finally it underwent renovations in 2016.

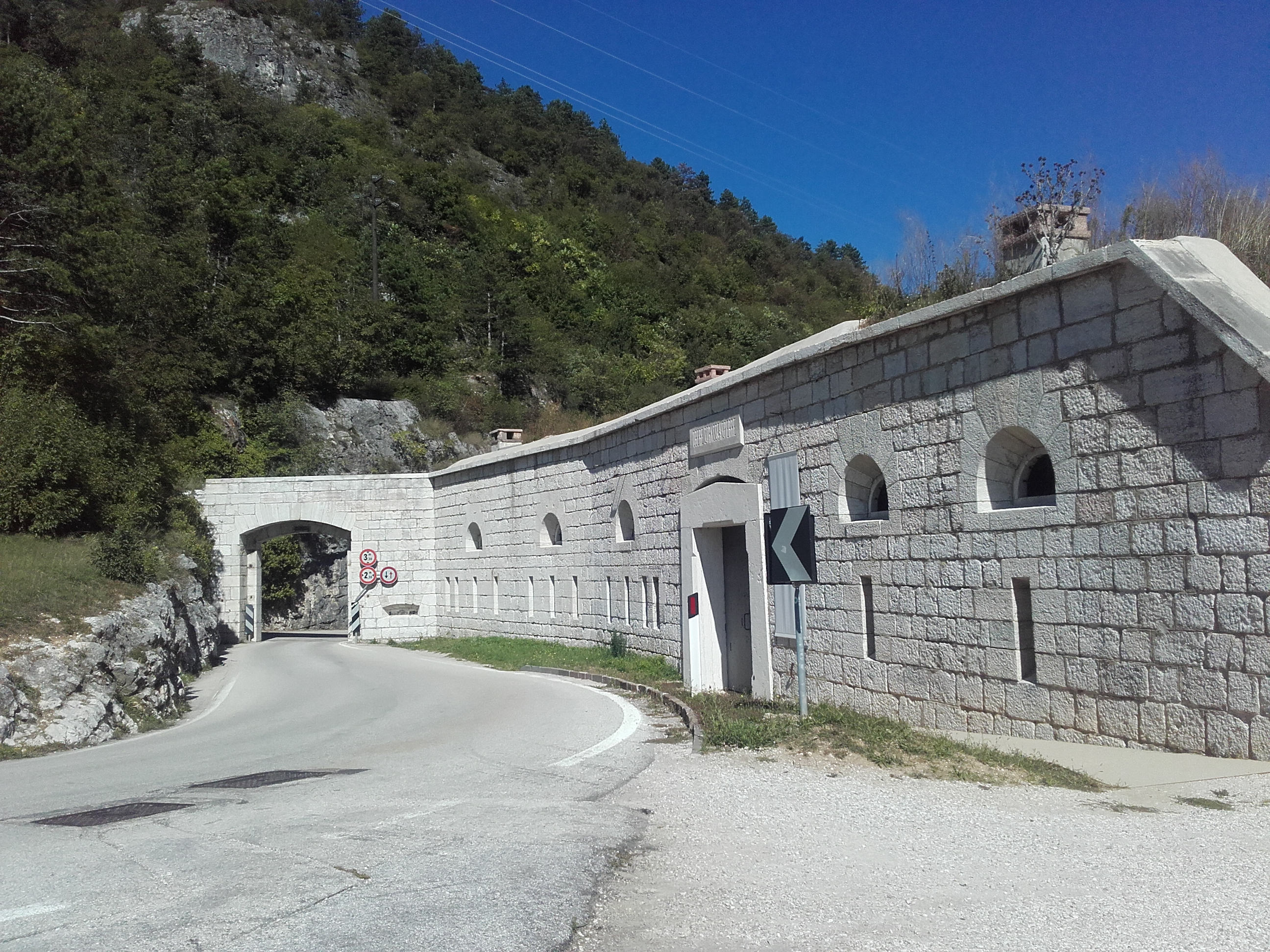
A view of the middle battery of Civezzano as you come from down the road. The smaller artillery was positioned in the large openings while the slits are for rifles.

== Lower road block ==
The lower road block was built into the rock on the side of the "Croatian" road near Civezzano. Lower was built between 1868 and 1876. 2 gunports were carved into the rock on the side of the road, a new innovation for the Austro-Hungarians. A 3rd gunport was carved in 1897, alongside the building of an infantry fort to guard the Valsugana railway. An iron door physically blocked the area where the Fersina Gorge narrows. The fort was armed with 2 12cm guns and 3 7cm M95 K.K field cannons, all mounted in casemates facing towards Civezzano. This part of the fortification was the only to not be disarmed by 1898, which at that time sported 3 7cm guns mounted in the caves. Lower was the only fortification in the ring of fortifications around Trento to remain in use during World War I.

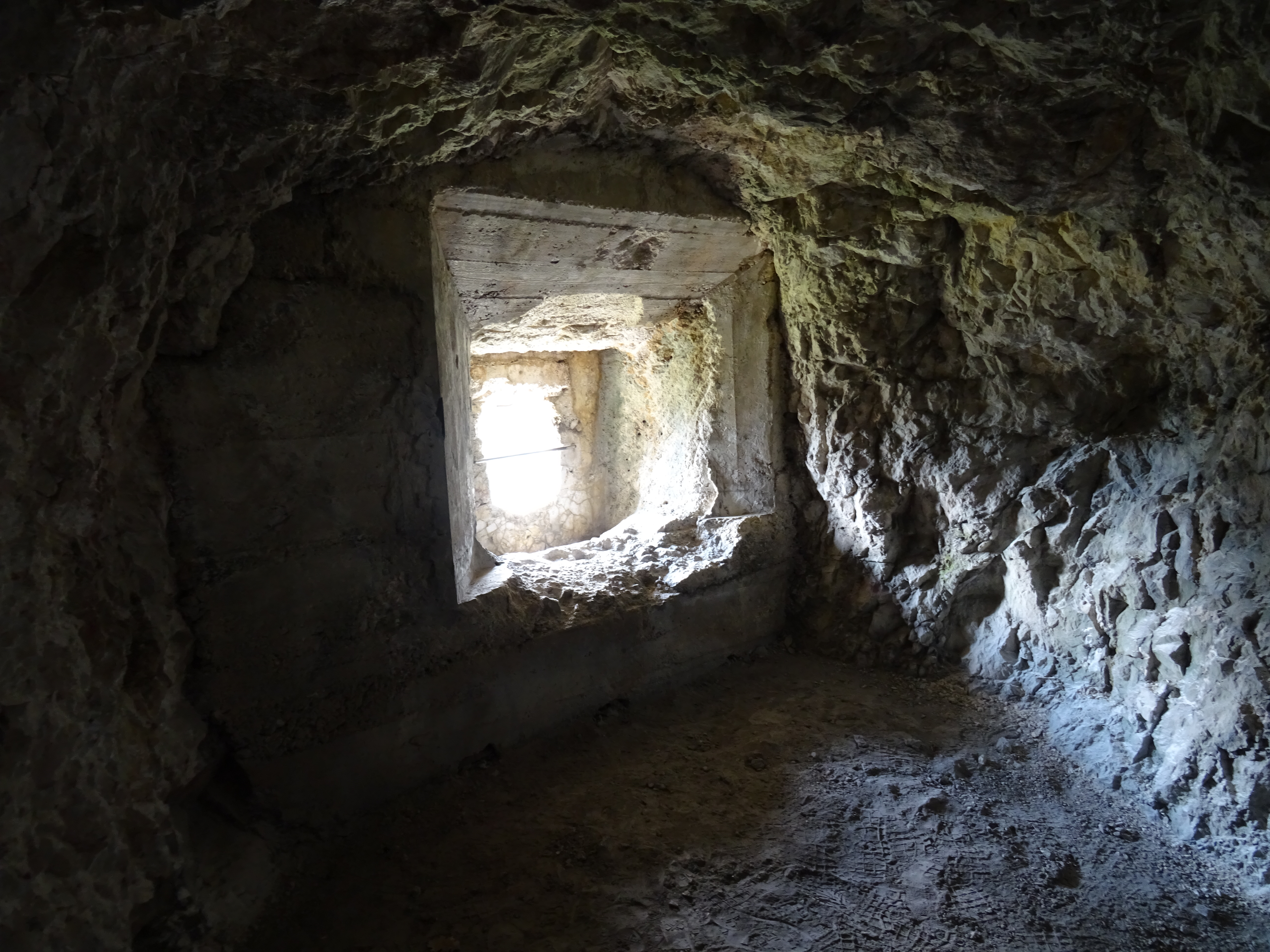
One of the excavated gun ports in the lower battery.
