= Monte Calisio =

Mountain in Italy

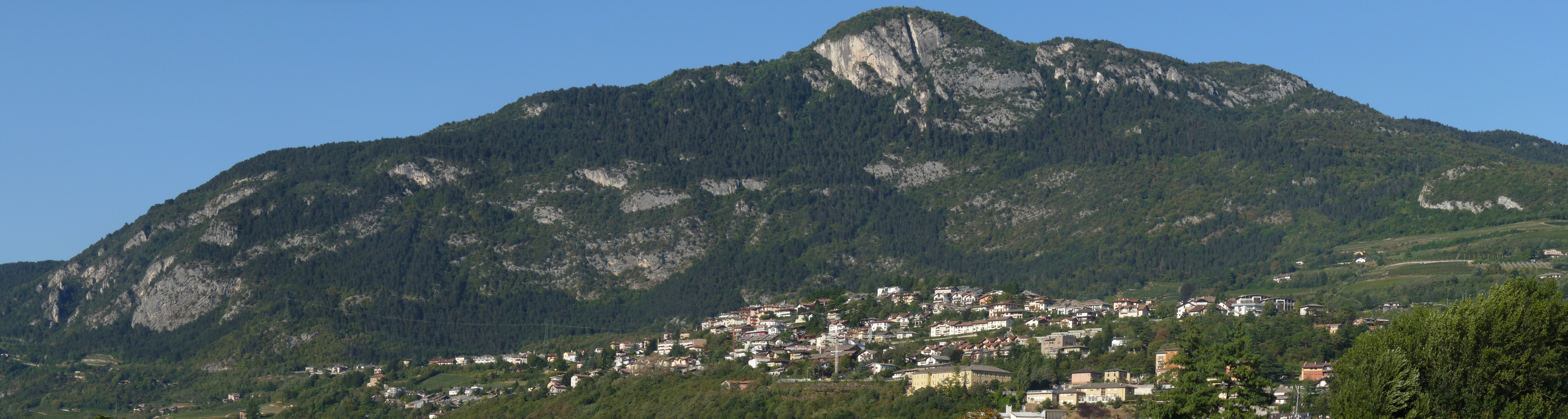
- Monte Calisio with the suburb of Martignano.

Highest point
- Elevation: 3,582 ft (1,092 m)
- Coordinates: 46°05′52″N 11°08′37″E

Geography

Geology
- Mountain type: Sedimentary rock

Monte Calisio (also called Argentario from Argento, meaning silver in Italian), at 3,582 feet (1,092 m), is a mountain located in the North of Italy and surrounded by the suburbs of Trento and Civezzano: Martignano, Cognola, Villamontagna, Gardolo and Melta di Gardolo.

== History ==
=== Prehistory ===
The first evidence of human presence in the whole region of Tirol was found here at the western slopes of Monte Calisio where, in 1971, the so called "Venere del Gàban", i.e. a statuette made from deer horn and portraying a woman, was found.

=== Roman Period ===
In 15 BC Roman general Nero Claudius Drusus built the so called via Claudia Augusta, a road which connected to Augsburg. This road passed along the places where now we can find the suburbs of Meano, Martignano and Cognola and sometimes it coincided with still existing trails.

=== Argentario mines ===
In the past on the slopes of Monte Calisio there were many important silver mines (hence the name "Argentario", which nowadays is commonly used to mean the district of Martignano and Cognola). These mines provided silver to Tirol in particular by means of the mint of Merano. This is the reason for which the most ancient mining code in Europe was written in 1207 at Trento by Prince-Bishop Federico Vanga (or Wanga). These mines lost their importance during the fifteenth century when a new very important mine in Schwaz was discovered near Innsbruck. Many of these old mines, locally called canope, are still visible in the woods of Monte Calisio and some of them can still be accessed (see for example the Busa del Pomar).

=== Contemporary history ===
In previous centuries the slopes of Monte Calisio were relatively sparsely populated. However, in the last century more and more people decided to live there causing the above mentioned suburbs to grow at high rate.

Below the mountain top, at 2,719 feet (829 m), the ruins of Forte Casara can be found. This was a fort, built just before World War I by Austro-Hungarian Empire and abandoned during 1915.
