= Lake Valle =

Glacial lake in Trentino-Alto Adige, Italy

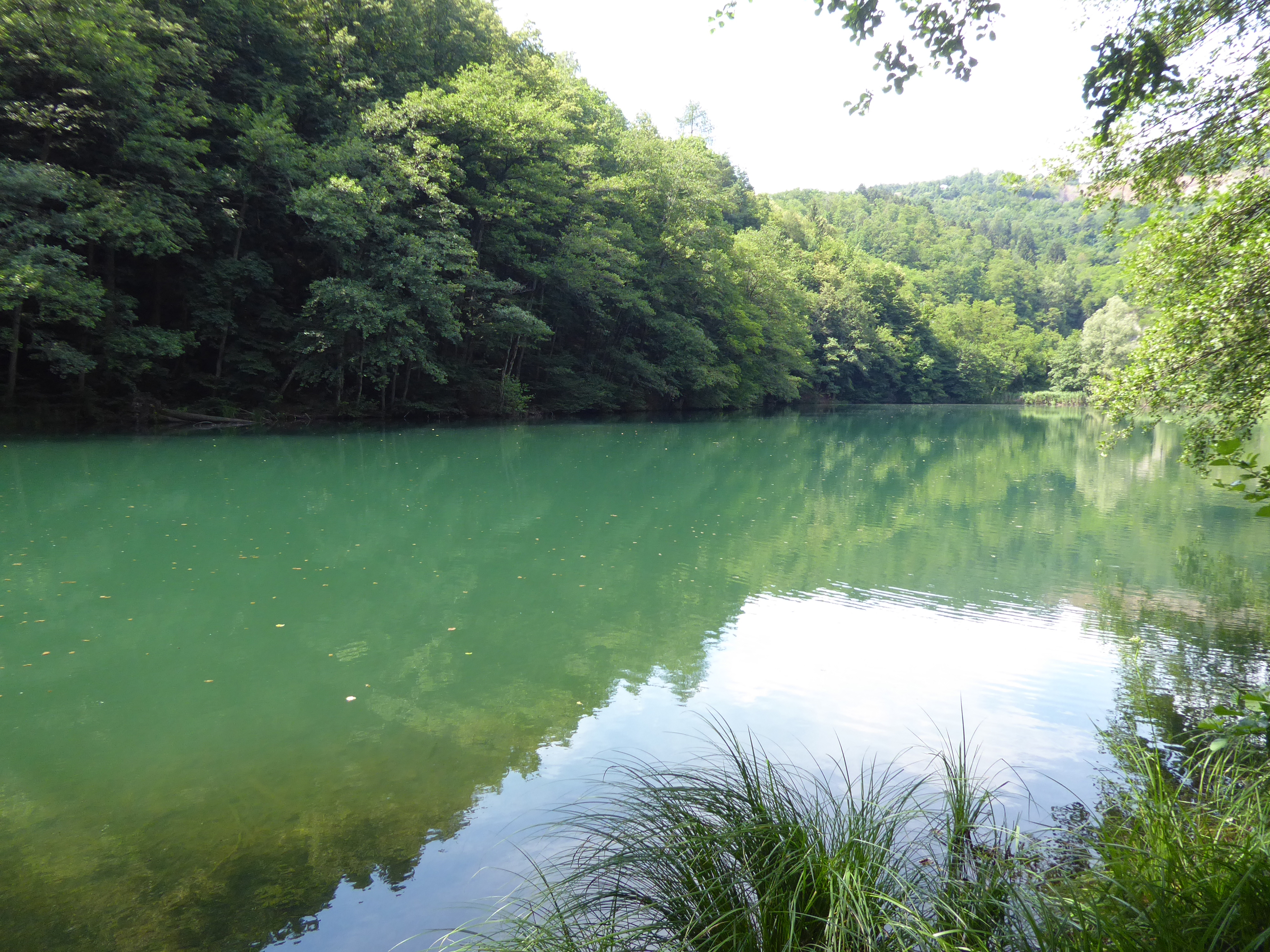

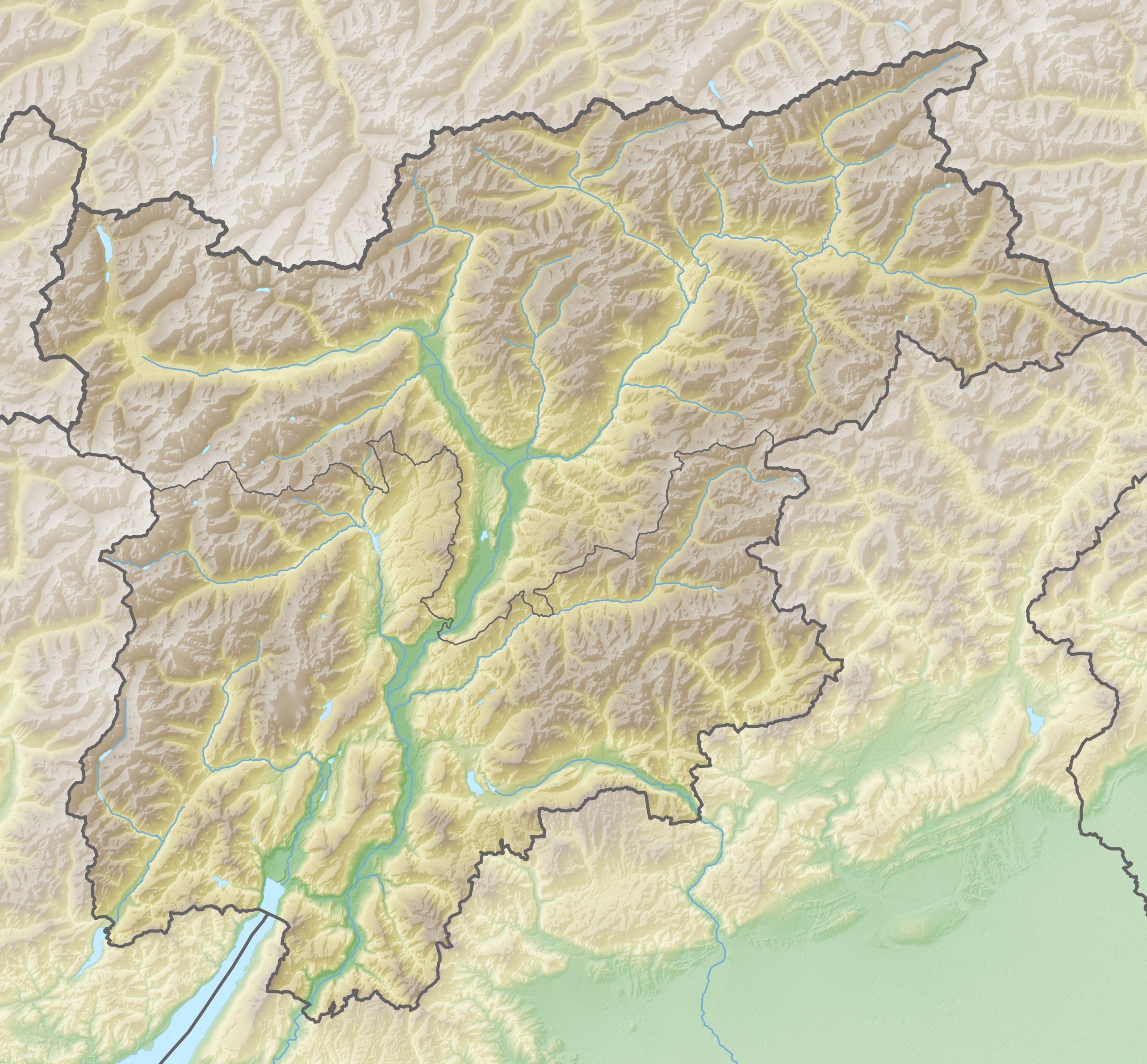
- Location of Lake Valle Lake Valle (Italy)
- Location: Fornace, Province of Trento, Trentino-Alto Adige, Italy
- Coordinates: 46°07′24″N 11°12′59″E
- Type: Glacial, alluvial dam
- Primary inflows: Rio Saro, Rio Santo Stefano, Rio Arfontane
- Primary outflows: Rio Lago di Valle
- Basin countries: Italy

The Lake Valle (also known as "Lake Castelet". or "Lake Fornace") is a lake in Italy in the Province of Trento, located in the municipality of Fornace. The lake is part of the drainage basin of the Fersina stream.

== Description ==
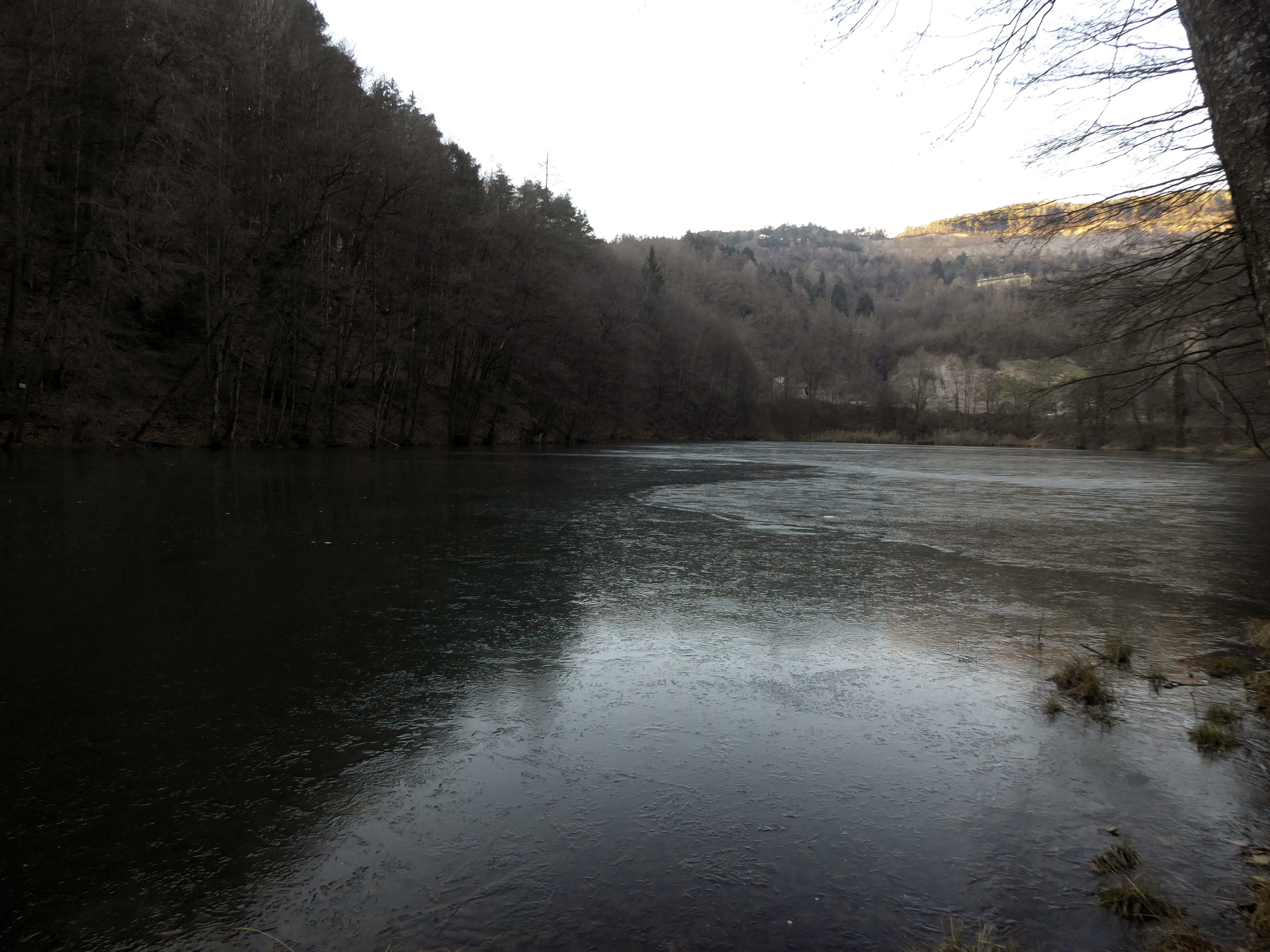
The lake partially frozen in winter

Lake Valle is an alluvial-dammed lake of glacial origin, elongated in shape with mostly steep shores, located on the western slope at the foot of the San Mauro hill. It is fed by the Rio Saro (or Rivo dei Sari or Rivo Riva), the Rio Santo Stefano (or Rivo Albiano), and the Rio Arfontane, and has a single outflow, the Rio Lago di Valle, which, after just 400 meters, flows into the Silla stream (older sources consider Lake Valle the source of the Silla stream, in which case the Rio Lago di Valle would be its initial part).

The lake serves as a biological corridor for numerous animal species, including its southern shore, occupied by a reed bed. Among the fish species, notable ones include, among others, pike, eel, and various cyprinids, including the tench, while among waterfowl, the moorhen, the grey heron, the mallard, the coot, and the great crested grebe are documented.

== History ==
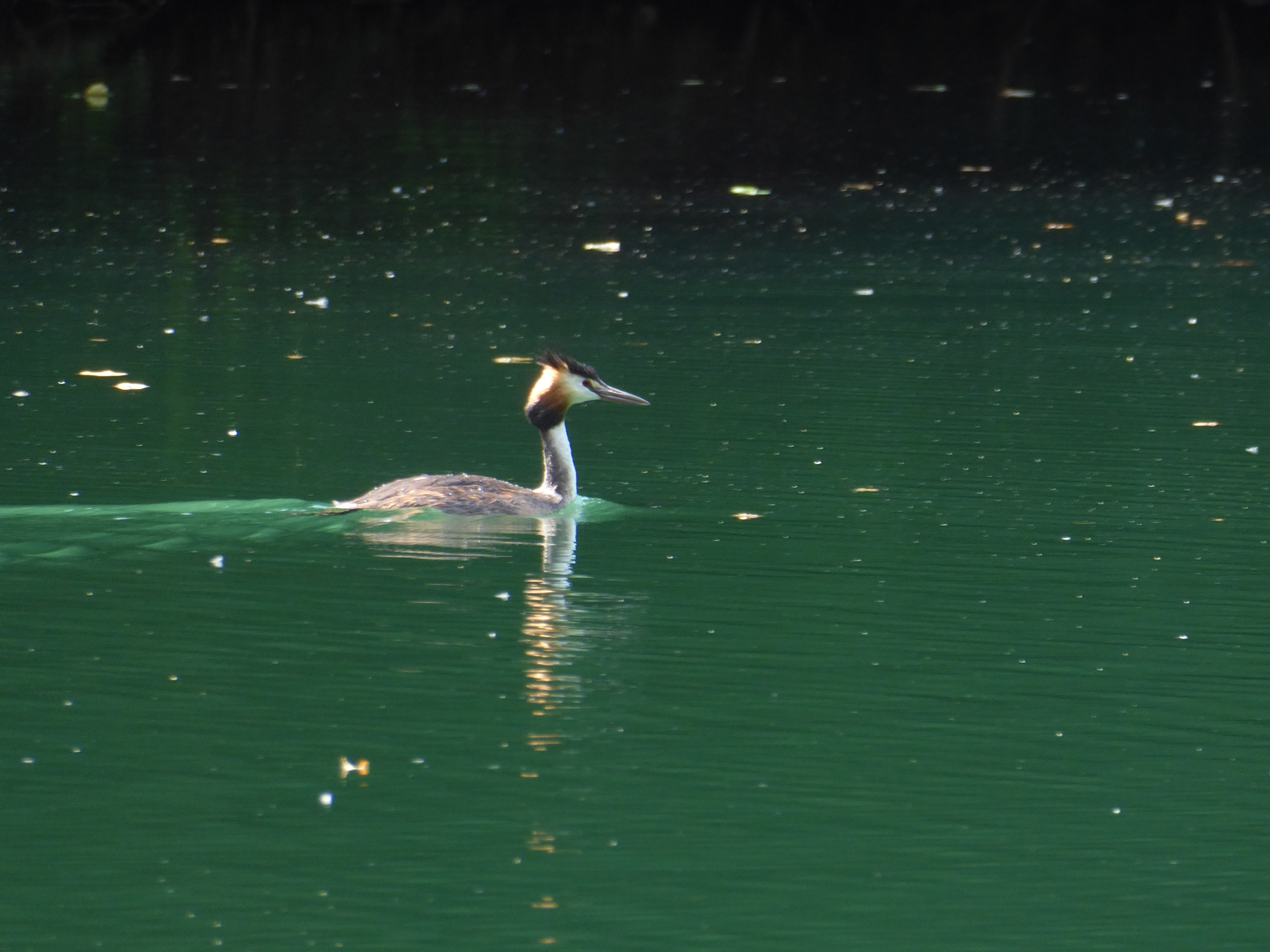
A great crested grebe in the lake’s waters

Starting from the 1970s, the extraction of porphyry exerted significant anthropogenic pressure on the lake (in addition to the provincial road 71, which flanks it on the eastern shore); the waste from quarry processing (one of which, later closed, was located right next to the northern shore) ended up in the lake, either carried by rain or by human action (some discharge pumps were seized by the Comando carabinieri per la tutela ambientale e la transizione ecologica in 2009.); as a result, the lake underwent severe degradation, to the point that in the early 2000s it was considered almost devoid of life forms; subsequently, a restoration and requalification project was initiated, and, by 2020, fishing is possible in the lake

== Bibliography ==
- Bollettino ufficiale [Official Bulletin] (in Italian). Istituto poligrafico dello Stato. 1942. p. 2065.
- Zuccagni-Orlandini, Attilio (1840). Corografia fisica, storica e statistica dell'Italia corredata di un Atlante: di Mappe geografiche e topografiche [Physical, Historical, and Statistical Geography of Italy Accompanied by an Atlas: of Geographical and Topographical Maps] (in Italian). Vol. 7. p. 20.
