= Busa del Pomar =

Silver mine in Trento, Italy

Coordinates: 46°07′06″N 11°07′36″E

'Busa del Pomar' is an ancient silver mine located in the north of Italy, just north east Trento.

It is one of the major mines (locally called canope) that are part of the old Monte Calisio silver-mining complex.

== Position and structure ==
The mine is situated at about 600 m asl and is located about 1 km from the village of Gardolo di Mezzo, near both to Masi Saracini and to Via Claudia Augusta.

The mine has three entrances: the lower entrance and the main entrance are connected and continue with a remarkable development of tunnels which are often unstable and passable with difficulty. The third entrance, unlike the previous ones, does not continue in depth but stops almost immediately.

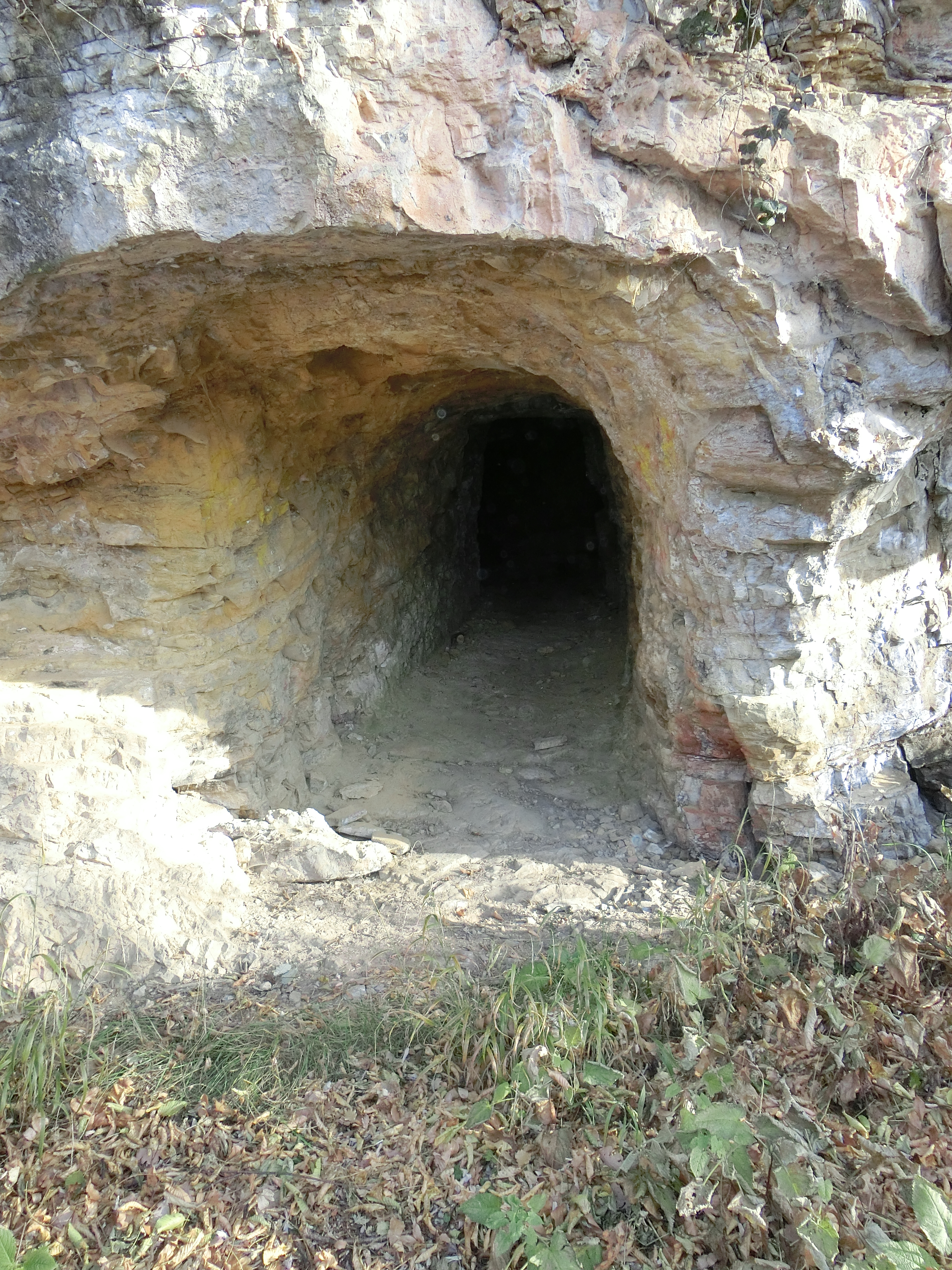
Lower Entrance

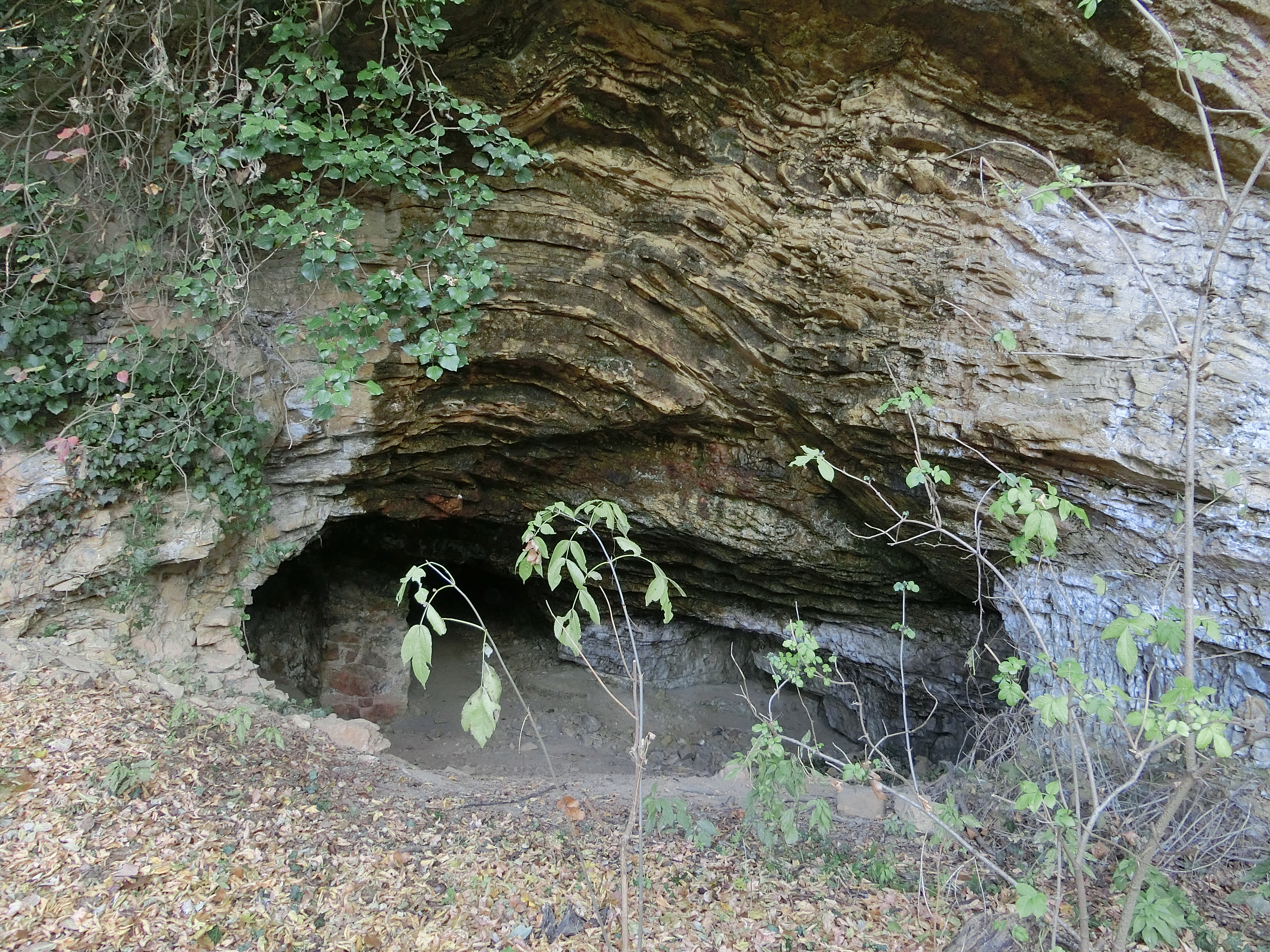
Main Entrance

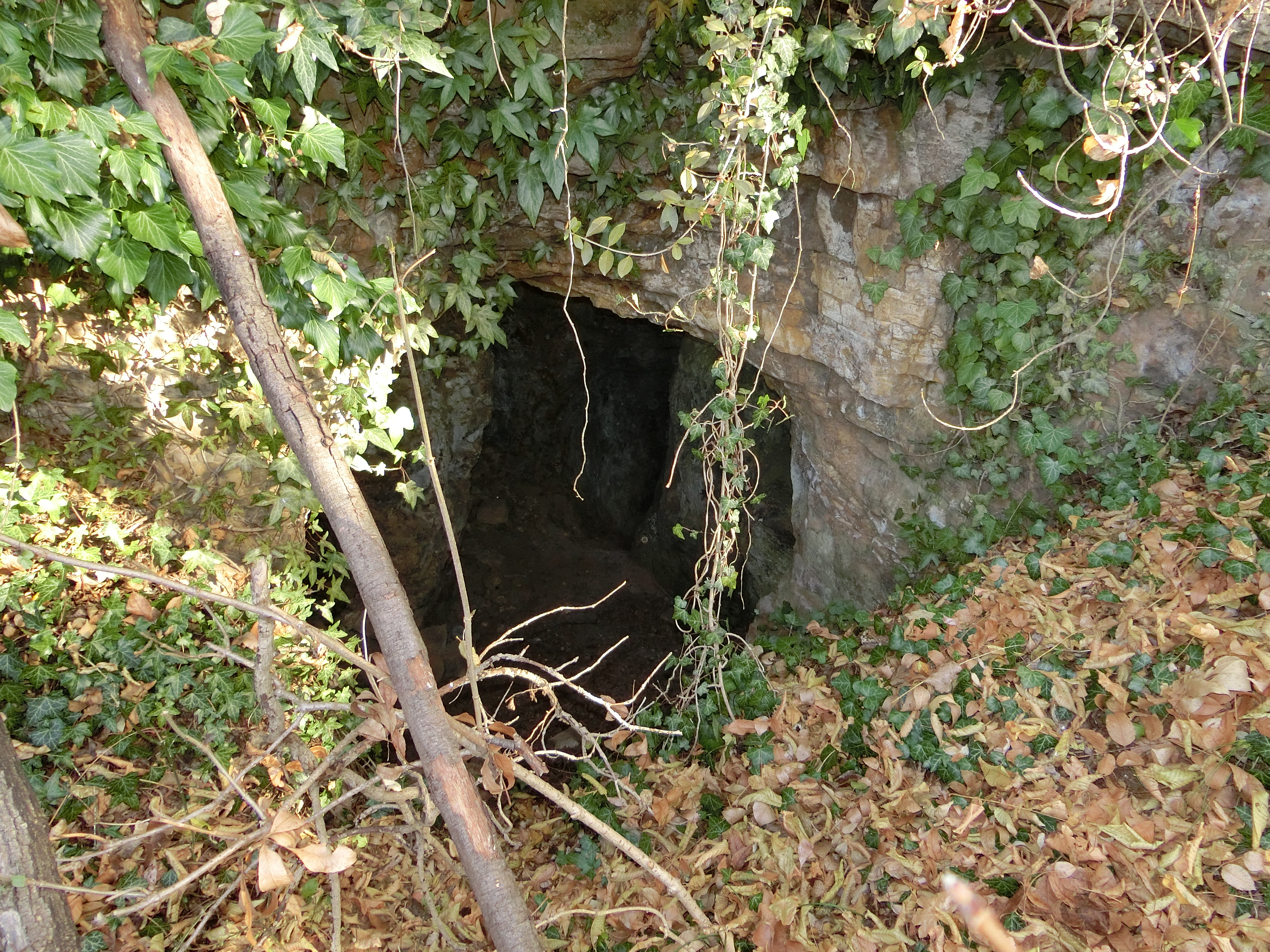
Upper Entrance

== Geology and extracted material ==
The deposit is of sedimentary origin and in particular is part of the last layer of limestone of Bellerophon Formation.

The mined ore consisted of galena containing significantly high percentage of silver.

Inside the mine are still observable small strands of barite.

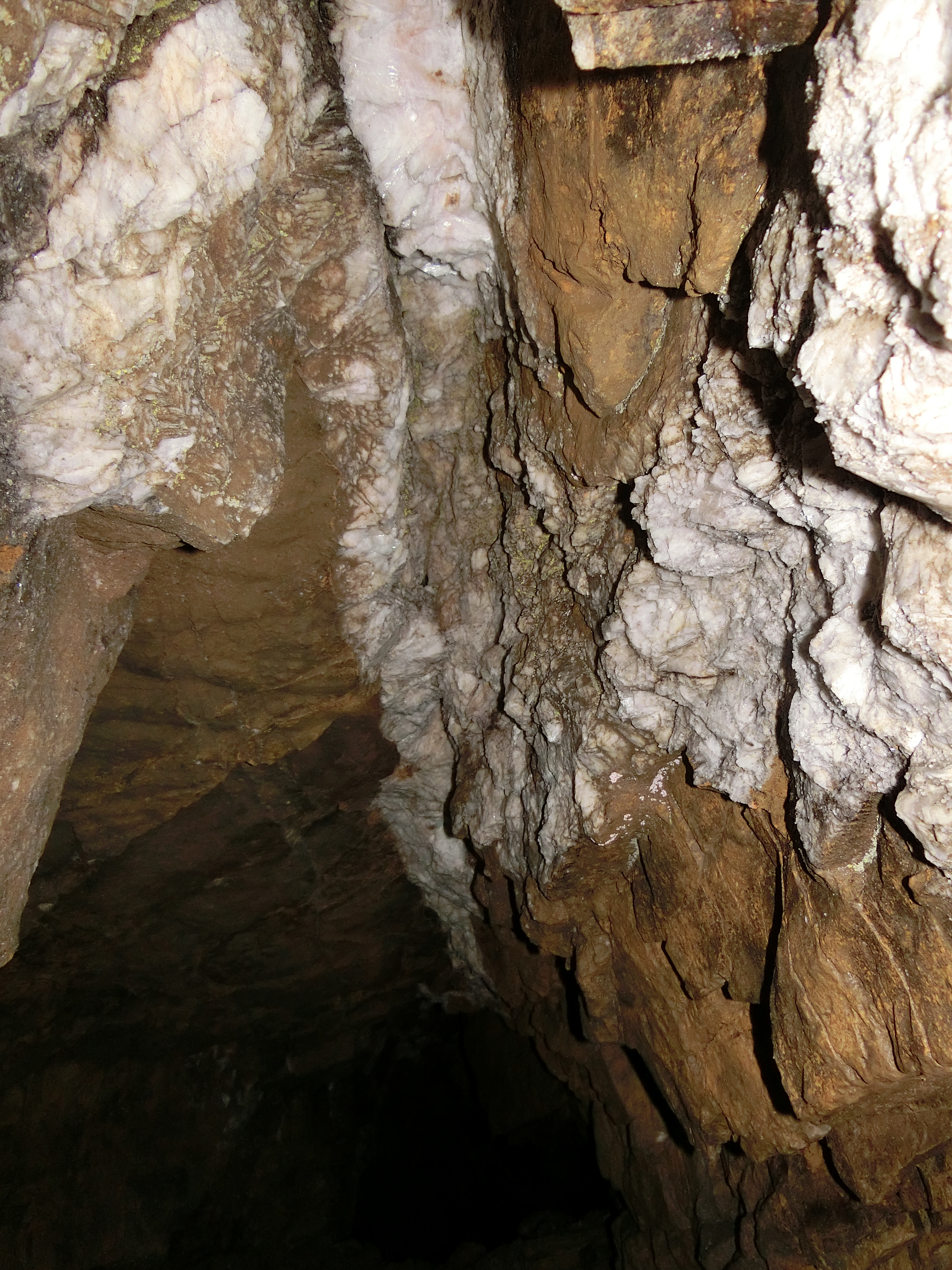
Strand of Barite

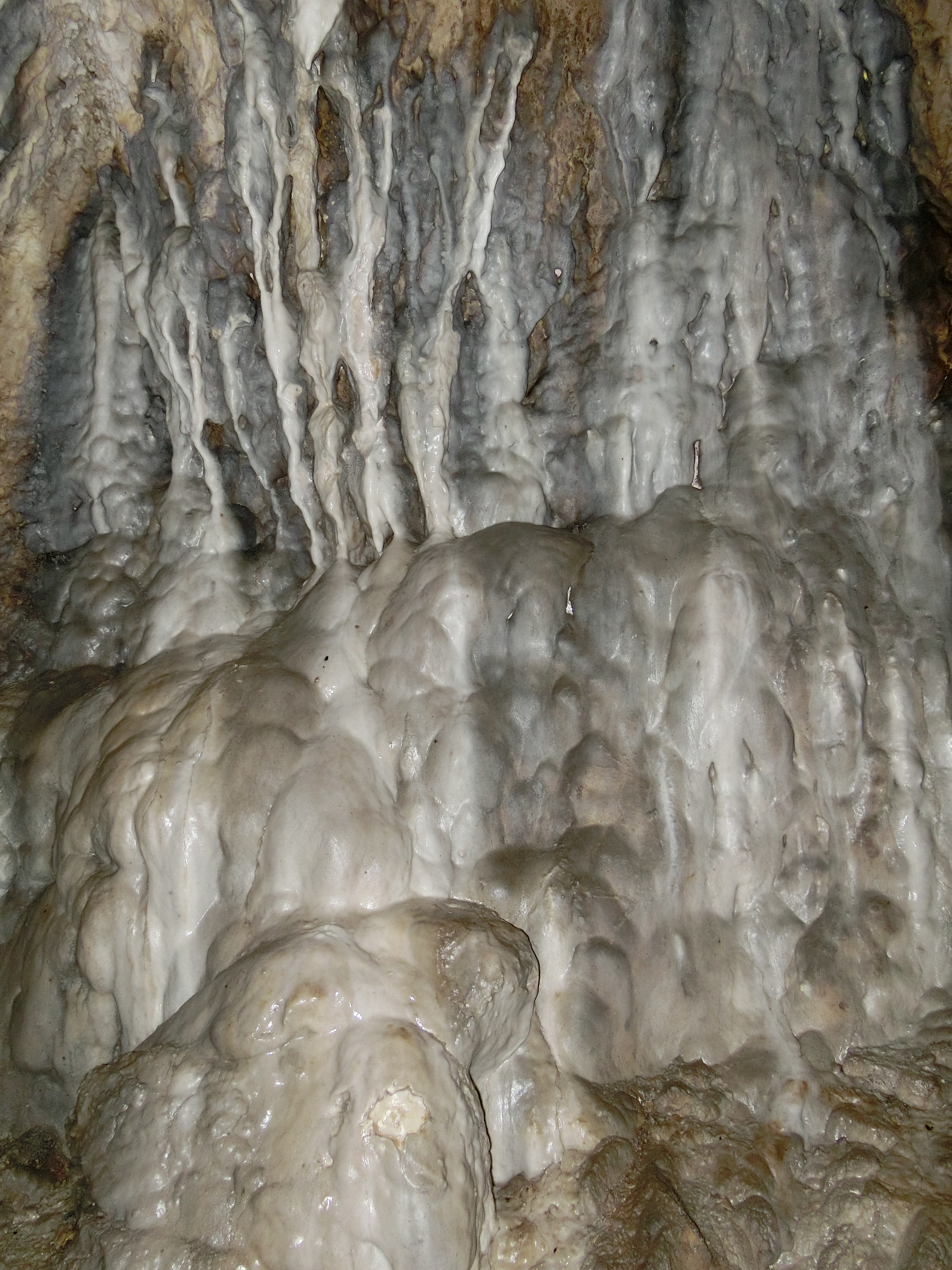
Concretion
