= Fornace =

- Comune
- Comune di Fornace
- Coat of arms

- Location within Italy Location within Trentino-Alto Adige/Südtirol
- Coordinates: 46°7′N 11°13′E
- Country: Italy
- Region: Trentino-Alto Adige/Südtirol
- Province: Trentino (TN)

Government
  - Mayor: Matteo Colombini

Area
  - Total: 7.2 km^{2} (2.8 sq mi)

Population (2026)
  - Total: 1,363
  - Density: 190/km^{2} (490/sq mi)
- Time zone: UTC+1 (CET)
  - Summer (DST): UTC+2 (CEST)
- Postal code: 38040
- Dialing code: 0461
- Website: Official website

Fornace (Fornàs in the local dialect) is a comune (municipality) in Trentino in the northern Italian region Trentino-Alto Adige/Südtirol, located about 10 kilometres (6 mi) northeast of the capital city of Trento. It surrounds Castel Fornace, a renaissance structure built by the noble House of Roccabruna. As of 31 December 2004, it had a population of 1,218 and an area of 7.2 square kilometres (2.8 mi^{2}).

Fornace borders the following municipalities: Lona-Lases, Baselga di Pinè, Albiano, Civezzano and Pergine Valsugana.

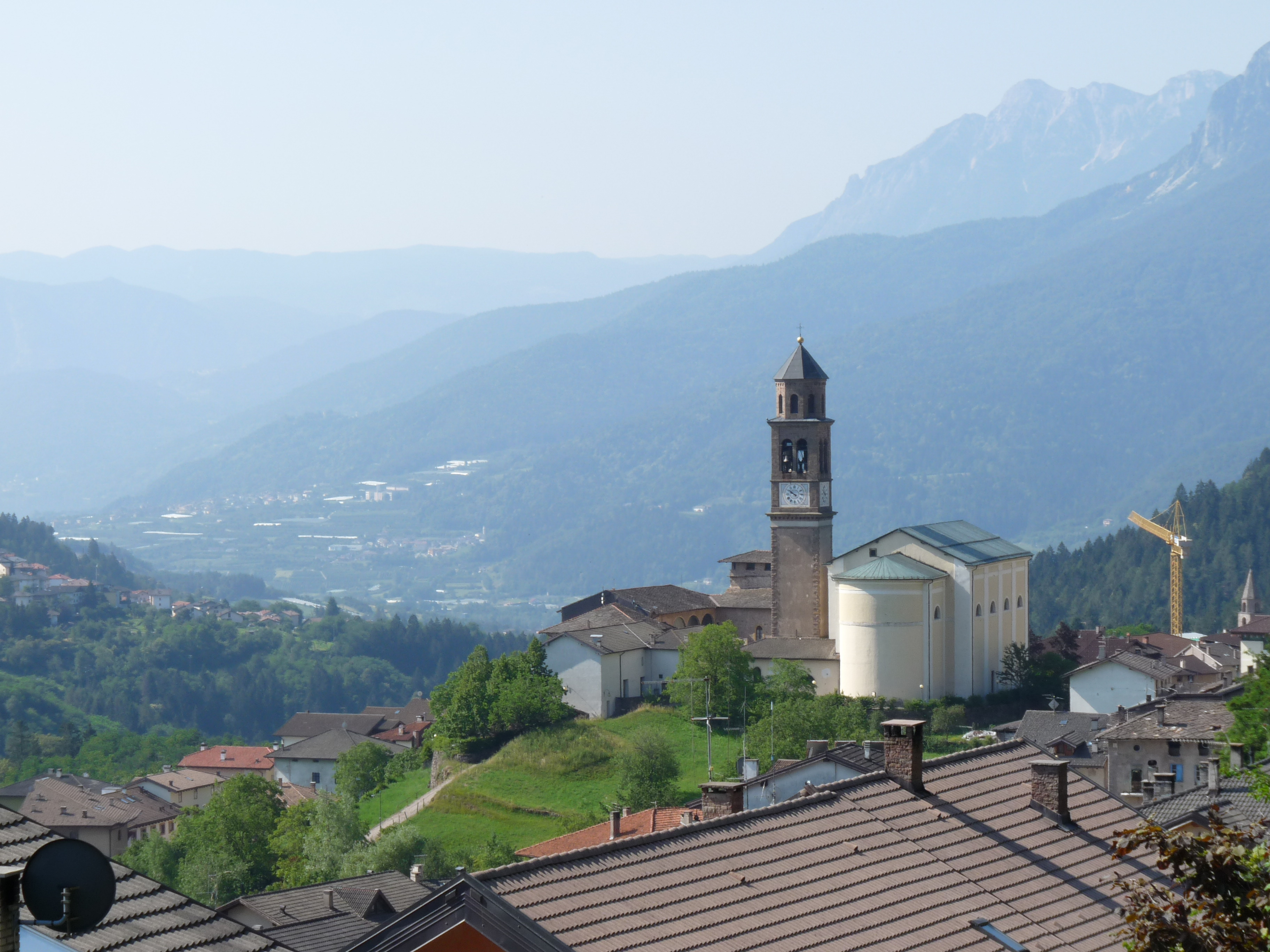
Castle and church

== Demographic evolution ==
Historical population

Year	Pop.	±%
1861	?	—
1871	?	—
1881	?	—
1901	?	—
1911	?	—

Year	Pop.	±%
1921	901	—
1931	840	−6.8%
1936	776	−7.6%
1951	857	+10.4%
1961	910	+6.2%

Year	Pop.	±%
1971	932	+2.4%
1981	900	−3.4%
1991	981	+9.0%
2001	1,166	+18.9%

Source: Data from ISTAT

== See also ==
- Lake Valle
