= Fort Casara =

Austro-Hungarian fortification near Trento, Italy

Coordinates: 46°06′02″N 11°08′55″E

Fort Casara (Italian: Forte Casara) was built between 1880-85 as a secondary position in the ring of Austro-Hungarian forts around the Northern Italian city of Trento. Casara controlled the Civezzano-Monte Vaccino road from the Monte Calisio Pass at a height of 896m. The fort had the object of striking towards the Adige and Valsugana Valleys. In addition to this, Casara was meant to block the circumvention of the Fersina Valley. Inside, the fort contained a power plant, telephone, kitchen, some barracks and an indispensable water supply. Casara was not well armed because it was in the second line of defense. The fort had 6 12cm howitzers emplaced outside with 120cm high protection. 2 50cm spotlights were placed outside.

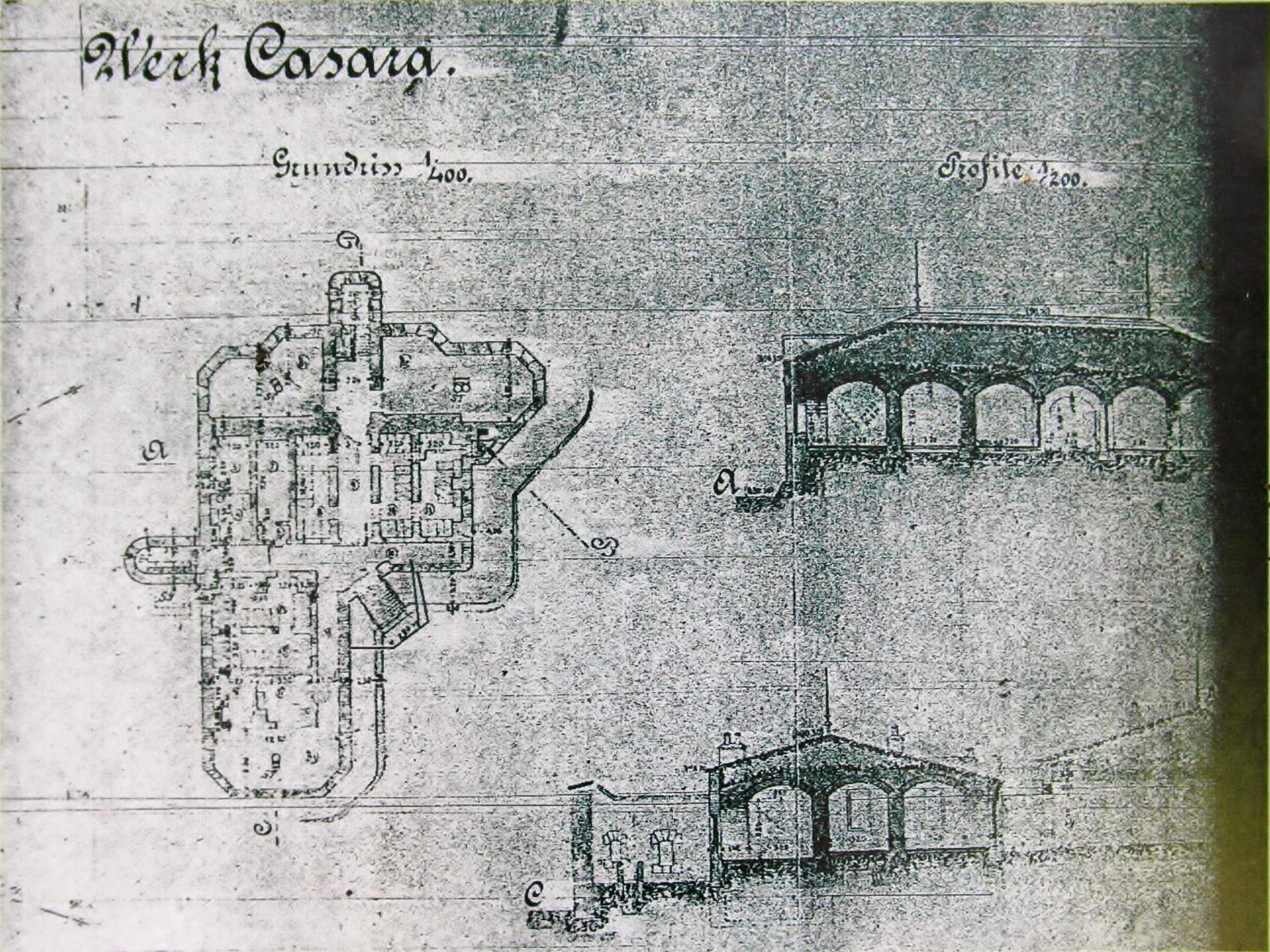
The floor plan of Fort Casara.

== World War I ==
Built out of local stone, Casara was obsolete by 1915. In 1915, the fort was demolished by the Austrians, and its armament was removed and placed in special caves excavated from the nearby rock. Within the cave battery, some of the guns faced towards Pergine while some faced towards the Adige Valley.

== Post-war ==
After the war the fort was decommissioned on August 12, 1927 by Royal Decree No. 1882. On Dec. 17, 1934, the fort was sold to a citizen of Tavernaro for 10 Lire. Today, the fort lies in ruins and is only honored by a small plaque.

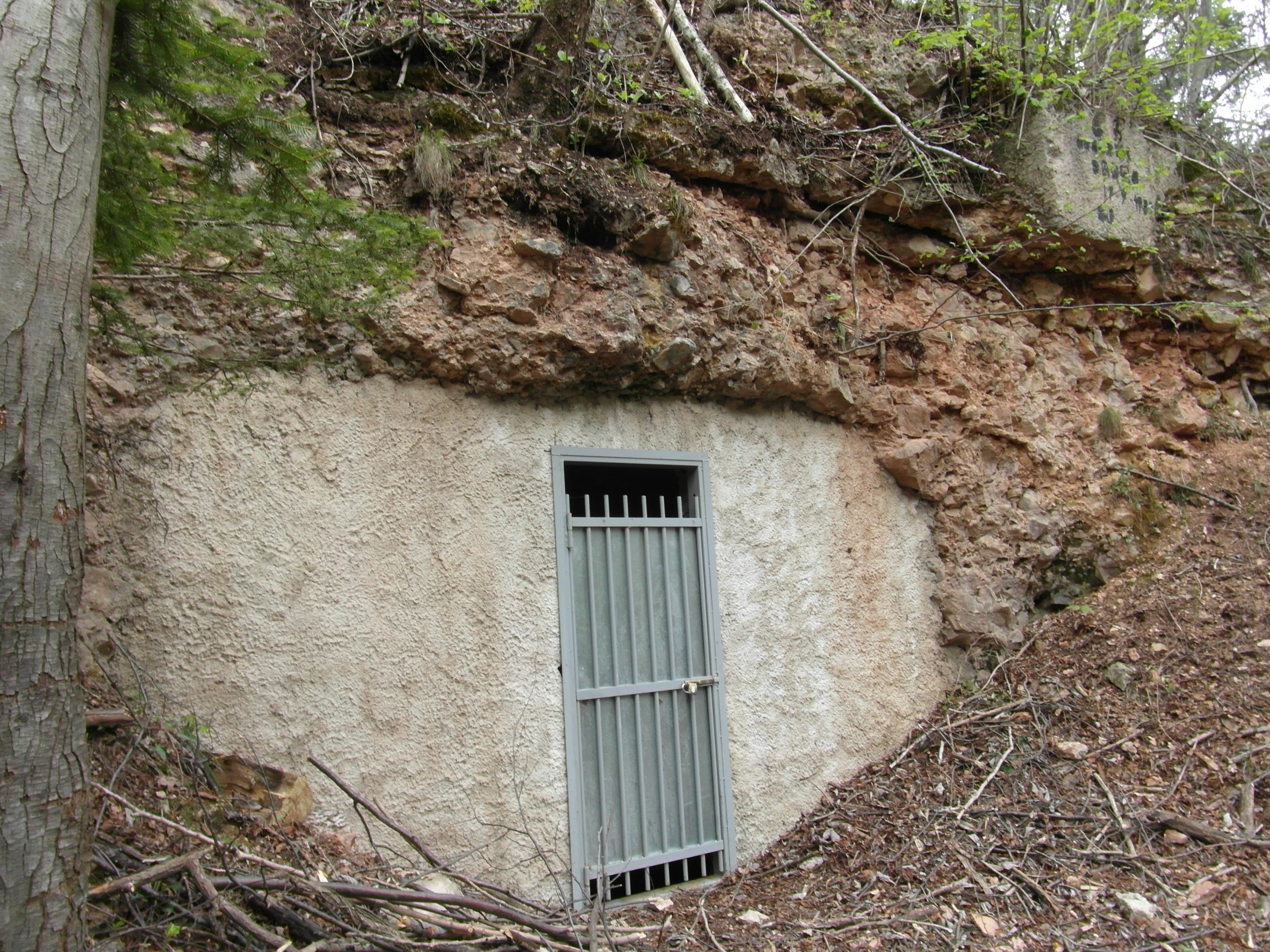
A side entrance to Fort Casara.
