= Cognola =

Town in the Trentino province, Italy

- Frazione
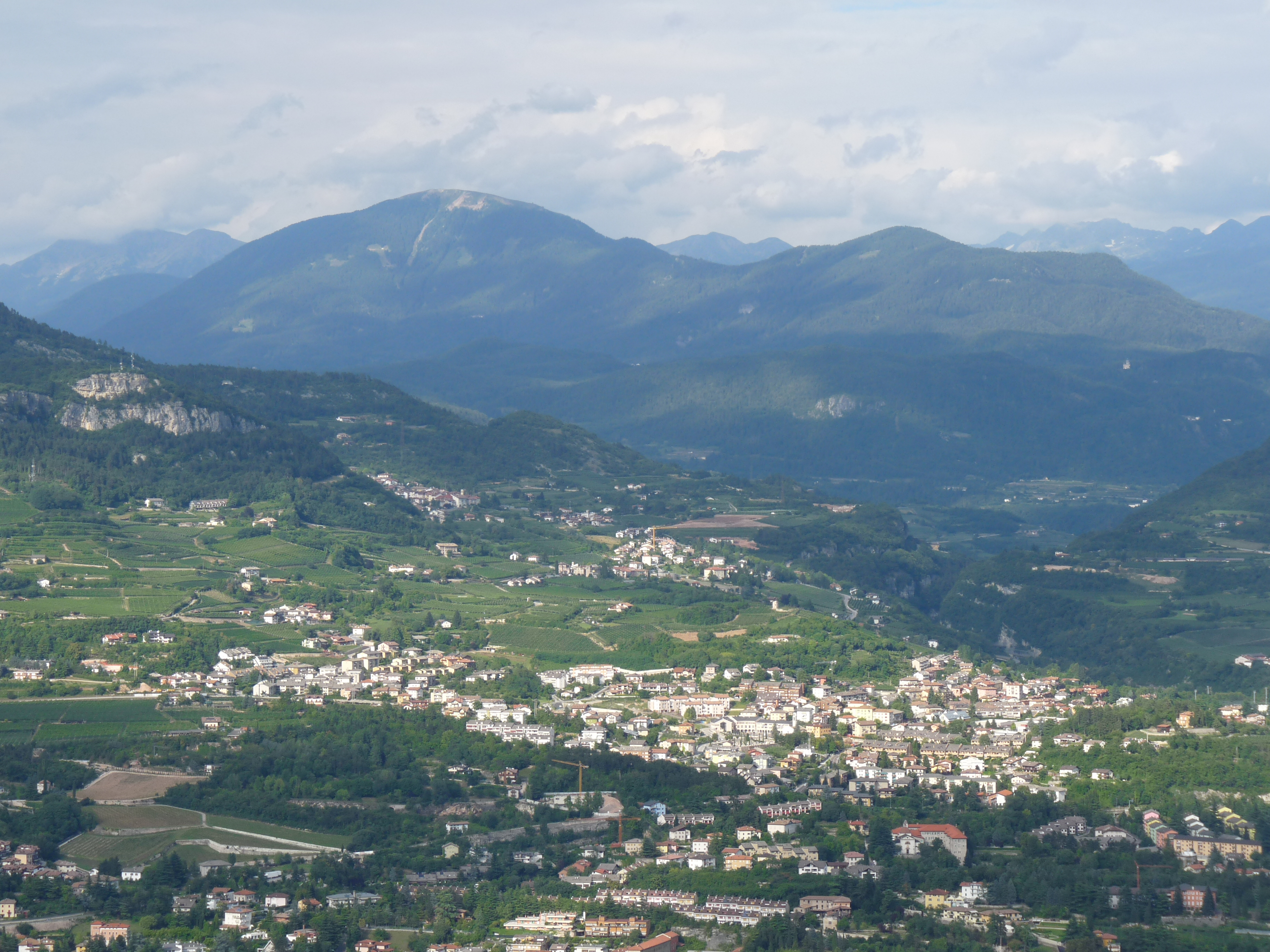
- Trento (Italy): view of Cognola from Sardagna

- Location of Cognola in Italy
- Coordinates: 46°04′35″N 11°08′31″E
- Country: Italy
- Region: Trentino-Alto Adige
- Metropolitan city: Trento
- Comune: Trento
- Demonym: Cognolotti
- Time zone: UTC+1 (CET)
  - Summer (DST): UTC+2 (CEST)
- Postal code: 38121
- Dialing code: 0461
- Patron saint: San Vito, San Modesto and Santa Crescenza
- Saint day: 26 June

Cognola is a town in the Trentino province, Italy. Administratively it is a frazione of the comune (municipality) of Trento, the third most populous town of the Alps.

Cognola was an autonomous comune from 1850 to 1926, when it was incorporated into the comune of Trento.

Along with Bergamini, Maderno, Martignano, Moià, Montevaccino, San Donà di Cognola, San Vito di Cognola, Tavernaro, Villamontagna and Zell it forms part of the circoscrizione number 6 municipal district Argentario of Trento.

== Geography ==
Cognola is located on the south west slops of monte Calisio, above Torrente Fersina. The area is composed mainly of sedimentary rocks and limestone with some reddish basalt. The climate and vegetation are typical of the southern pre-Alps.

== History ==
The hill on the eastern side of Trento has seen human activity since pre-historic times, starting in the Mesolithic and in particular in the Neolithic periods. This is evidenced by the important archaeological site of Riparo del Gaban in nearby Martignano. During the Bronze Age there were active foundries that worked on the metals extracted in the area of Pergine Valsugana. In the same time period deforestation began along with the first cultivation of cereals and grapevines. Like in other areas around Trento, there was a castelliere that was used as a communal refuge for defensive purposes, on the current location of Dos Castion.

During Roman times, the area around Cognola was organized in small groups of houses to promote agricultural production in the area, a similar organization remained until the 19th century. Cognola was crossed by a minor branch of via Claudia Augusta (on present day Via alla Veduta, Via alla Pellegrina and Via alle Coste.

In the medieval period the area came under the influence of the leaders of Povo. The restitution of the castle of Povo by Federico Vanga during an assembly in the prato di Cognola in 1210 is documented in the Codex Vangianus.

At the end of the 13th Century, the first mention was made of the church of Saint Vitus, Modesto and Crescenza, until 1907 this was a dependency of the Pieve of Saint Peter in Trento.

In the 16th century, Cognola was considered a part of Trento, and in 1672 it was granted the status of comune, with authority over the handling of its territory and population, while the magistrate of Trento retained control on urbanistic matters. In 1926 Cognola was brought into the comune of Trento.

Cognola was historically divided into two parts:

=== Cognola di Sopra ===
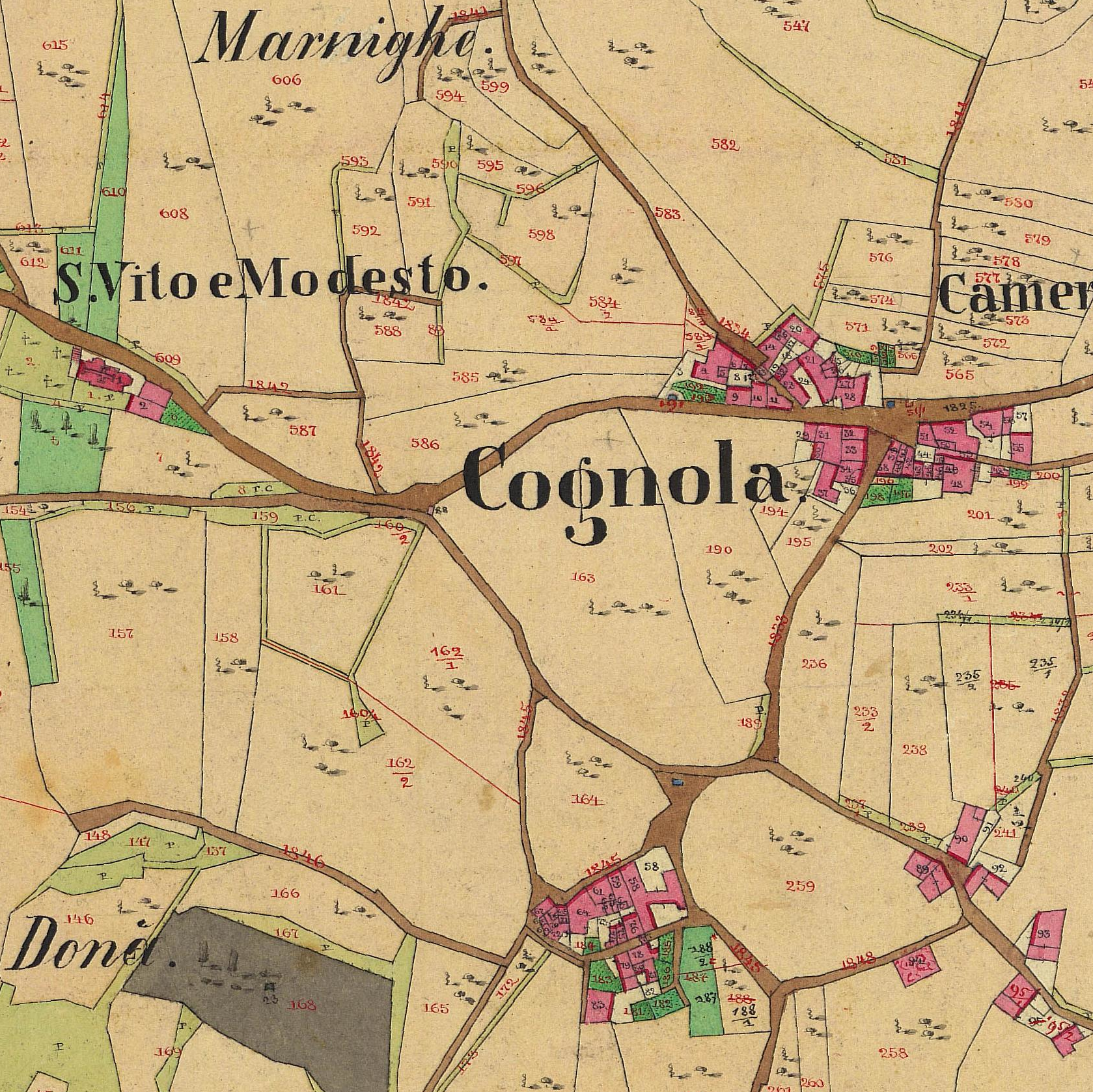
Cognola shown on a cadastral map in 1859.

Cognola di Sopra was built on the track of via Claudia Augusta at the foot of Dos del Oseléra, and developed around the historic town square at the intersection between via alla Veduta and via Grezoni. It consists of 3 buildings with internal courtyards that are accessed by stone doorways built in the 16th and 17th century.

=== Cognola di Sotto ===
Cognola di Sotto was located to the east of the prehistoric castelliere between Dos Castion and Via alle Campanelle it was a dense group of buildings of different ages built around a medieval nucleus.
