= Civezzano =

- Comune
- Comune di Civezzano
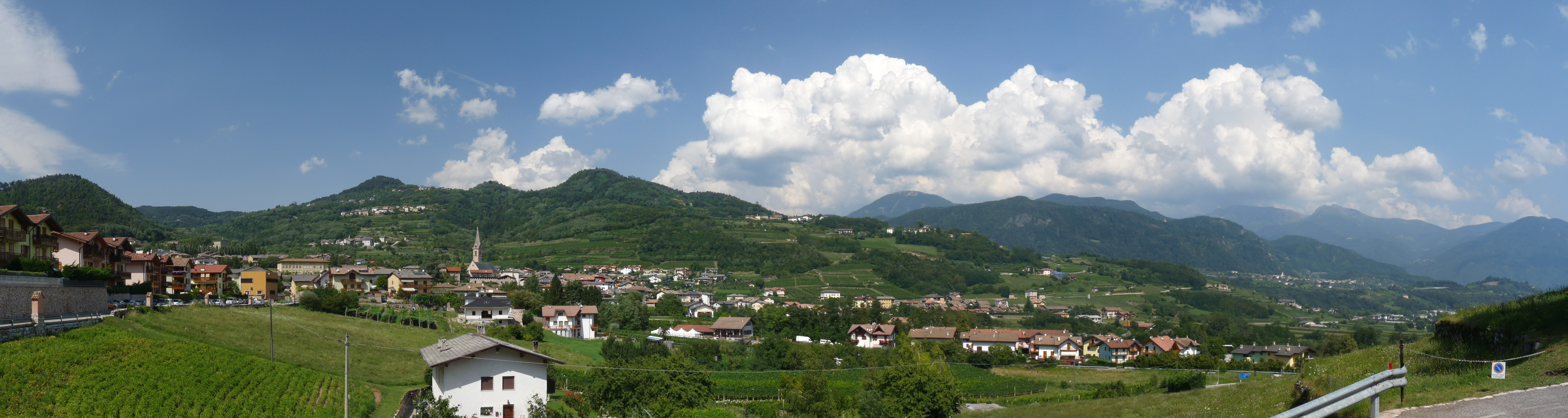

- Coat of arms

- Location within Italy Location within Trentino-Alto Adige/Südtirol
- Coordinates: 46°5′N 11°10′E
- Country: Italy
- Region: Trentino-Alto Adige/Südtirol
- Province: Trentino (TN)

Government
  - Mayor: Paolo Betti

Area
  - Total: 15.5 km^{2} (6.0 sq mi)

Population (2026)
  - Total: 4,177
  - Density: 269/km^{2} (698/sq mi)
- Time zone: UTC+1 (CET)
  - Summer (DST): UTC+2 (CEST)
- Postal code: 38045
- Dialing code: 0461
- Website: Official website

Civezzano (Zivezan in local dialect) is a comune (municipality) in Trentino in the northern Italian region Trentino-Alto Adige/Südtirol, located about 4 kilometres (2 mi) northeast of Trento. As of 31 December 2004, it had a population of 3,484 and an area of 15.5 square kilometres (6.0 mi^{2}).

Civezzano borders the following municipalities: Albiano, Trento, Fornace and Pergine Valsugana.

== Demographic evolution ==
Historical population

Year	Pop.	±%
1861	?	—
1871	?	—
1881	?	—
1901	?	—
1911	?	—

Year	Pop.	±%
1921	2,815	—
1931	2,763	−1.8%
1936	2,699	−2.3%
1951	2,615	−3.1%
1961	2,558	−2.2%

Year	Pop.	±%
1971	2,491	−2.6%
1981	2,671	+7.2%
1991	2,794	+4.6%
2001	3,113	+11.4%

Source: Data from ISTAT
