= Fortress of Trento =

Fortifications in the municipality of Trento, Italy

- Festung Trient
- Trento in Italy
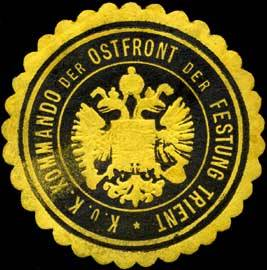
- Seal of the imperial royal fortress command during the Great War.

Site information
- Type: Fortified line
- Controlled by: Imperial Austrian Army; Austro-Hungarian Army
- Condition: Mostly open to visitation

Location
- Location within Trentino-Alto Adige/Südtirol
- Coordinates: 46°5′3.88″N 11°7′13.08″E

Site history
- Built: 1860-1915

Garrison information
- Past commanders: Lieutenant General Oskar Edler von Guseck; Major General Franz Edler von Steinhart; Lieutenant Colonel Nikolaus Borevic

The Fortress of Trento (German: Festung Trient) is the fortified wall built around the city of Trento starting in 1860 and strategically active until its dissolution in 1916.

The purpose of the fortress was to cope with the threats that the newly formed Kingdom of Italy could bring toward Trentino and South Tyrol in the second half of the 19th century. These provinces represented an Austrian salient in Italian territory, and the city of Trento was a crucial junction in the Habsburg Empire's strategy for the defense of its southern border. The first fortifications (1860–1864) were concentrated to the west of the city to block any advances from the newly acquired Lombardy of the Kingdom of Italy. The later ones, after the Veneto became Italian territory, provided cover for other possible lines of attack. In this case, these were fortifications of a permanent nature. Before the outbreak of World War I, the fortress underwent a drastic rearrangement and reinforcement to adapt it to the needs of modern warfare. The permanent works, considered antiquated, were dismantled and numerous modern field fortifications were built all around the city. With all threats having disappeared after the withdrawal and consolidation of the front following the Frühjahrsoffensive, the Fortress of Trento was decommissioned and its armaments transferred to areas deemed more important.

The term "Fortress City" also refers to all the consequences that the status of "Fortress" and the crucial junction of the Dolomite front had on the urban and social fabric of the city of Trento throughout the course of World War I.

== Introduction ==
The strategic importance of the city of Trent and its territory becomes evident once the geography of Trentino is examined. Not only is the city located along the most important communication route between Lombardy-Veneto and the heart of the Austro-Hungarian Empire, but it also represents the point of convergence of the most important valleys in Trentino. Therefore, since the southern front was well protected by the Fortresses of the Quadrilatero (consisting of the cities of Legnago, Mantua, Peschiera, and Verona), any threats would have come from those who decided to go around it by cutting the Adige Valley in two coming from the east (Valsugana) or from the west (Val di Sole, Val di Non, and Giudicarie) to disrupt supplies to the Austrian troops in Veneto. Even in the case of advances from the south, the city represented a key barrage between the Italian plain and the Danube valleys. These characteristics caused Trento to be transformed into a fortress city in the second half of the 19th century with the gradual building of a continuous ring of forts and barrages all around the city.

The first manifestation of Trent's military vulnerability occurred in 1703 when, during the War of the Spanish Succession, General Vendôme decided to threaten Austria with an advance through Trent and Tyrol. Having defeated the Austrians on Monte Baldo, the French troops pushed on to Trent, besieging and bombarding it for 10 days between 2 and 12 September 1703. Even in the Napoleonic era, the strategic importance of the city had become clear during the Italian Campaign (1796-1797), and it is precisely at that time that the first plans for the transformation of Trent into a stronghold drawn up by the Habsburg General Staff date back. Nevertheless, the annexation to the Kingdom of Bavaria (1805) and to the Napoleonic Kingdom of Italy (1810) and the subsequent restoration with the annexation of the whole of Lombardy-Veneto to the Austrian Empire (Congress of Vienna – 1815) interrupted any plans to fortify the region. In the following years, financial limitations and the lack of interest of the Habsburg rulers thwarted the concretization of any fortification project in Trentino.

However, serious threats became apparent starting in 1848 when Trentino, lacking military defenses, began to attract the interest of Italian patriots. During the uprisings of 1848, General Antonio Arcioni's Frankish Corps besieged Castel Toblino and occupied Vezzano and Padergnone after moving up from the Giudicarie. Other clashes took place in the valleys of Non and Sole. The loss of Lombardy as a result of the Second War of Independence (1859–1860) posed a new threat since troops of the newly formed Kingdom of Italy could easily have penetrated Trentino once they crossed the undefended border. It was Major General Johann Karl von Huyn (1812–1888) who outlined an initial defense plan that provided for a first line of surveillance along the border (Stelvio, Tonale, Giudicarie, etc...) and a second line set back closer to Trento to protect the Adige Valley (Bus de Vela barrage, Doss di Sponde blockhouse, Rocchetta barrage). Paradoxically, the Tonale Pass route was strongly desired by Marshal Radetzky to improve connections between Trentino and Lombardy in Austrian hands but now represented a possible new route of invasion. These barrages also served to protect the newly established Sudbahn railway line (today's Brenner Railway), which was the main supply route for the fortresses of the Quadrilatero.

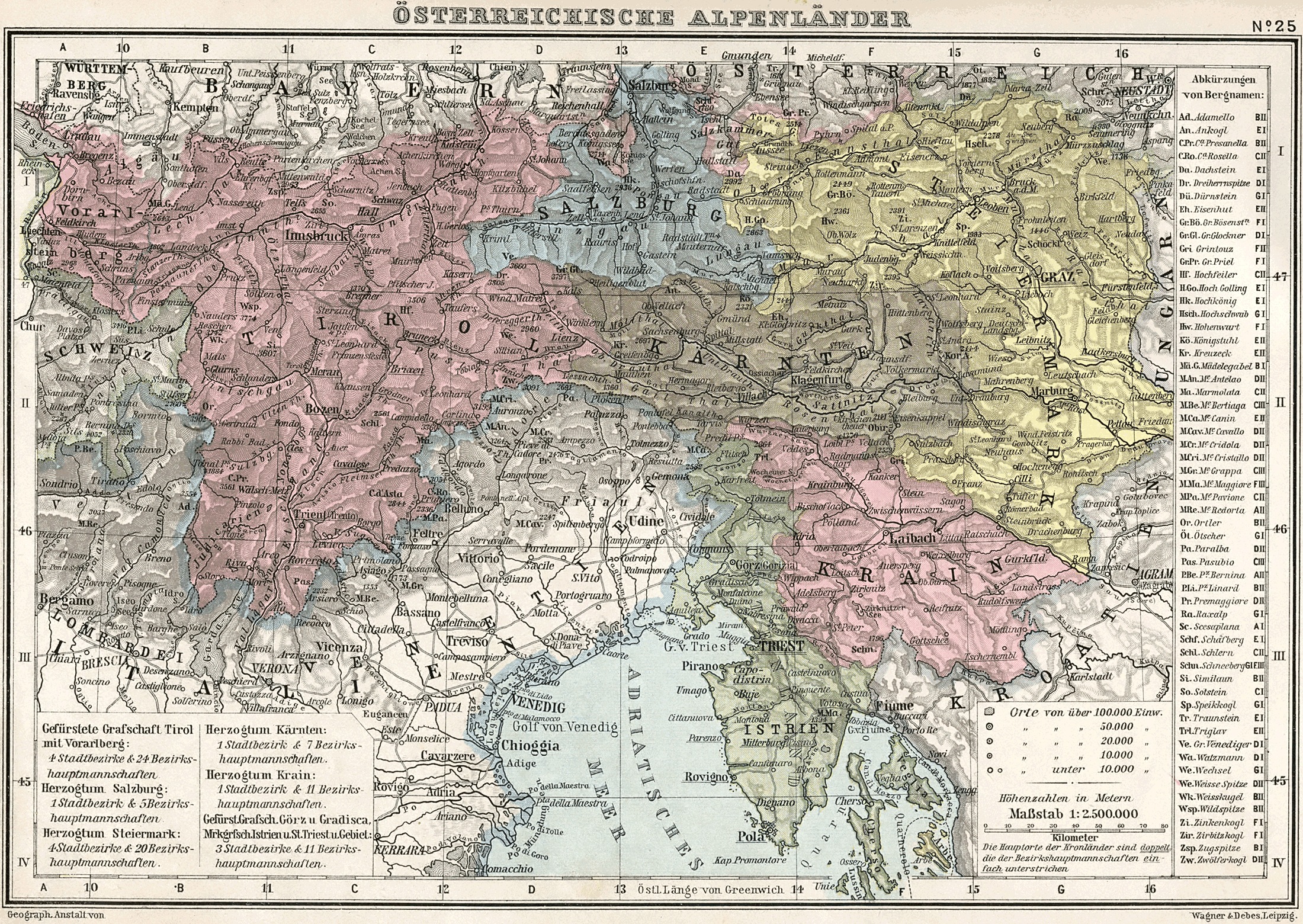
Alpine provinces after the Third War of Independence.

However, the Third Italian War of Independence in 1866 brought new threats to Trentino. Having allied itself on 8 April of that year with Otto von Bismarck's Prussia, which aimed to wage a war to gain hegemony over the German Confederation against Austria, the Kingdom of Italy aspired to engage the Habsburgs on a second front to conquer the Veneto and complete Unification while the bulk of Austrian troops were engaged in the north. Nevertheless, the defeat at Custoza put a brake on the Kingdom's ambitions, which halted all military operations to reorganize the army. This submissive attitude prompted the Prussian allies to complain about the conduct of a war that no longer diverted Austrian troops from the Bohemian front. To exacerbate the situation, a secret agreement signed on the eve of the war between Napoleon III and Franz Joseph was made public on 5 July, stating that Venetia would be ceded to Italy through the intercession of the French sovereign regardless of the outcome of the conflict.

In order to keep faith with the Italo-Prussian alliance, ward off any accusations of treason and legitimize the cession of Venetia with arms, in mid-July the Italian generals resumed the initiative by also attempting to secure Trent and Trieste. Moreover, after the defeat of the Imperials at Sadowa on 3 July, almost all of the Austrian troops stationed in Italy had been sent to reinforce the armies engaged against Prussia, creating a favorable conjuncture for a new Italian offensive. Only Trentino and the Quadrilatero remained garrisoned. The plan to secure Trent consisted of invading Trentino to the west with Garibaldi's corps of volunteers who were to rejoin the regular troops of General Giacomo Medici who were simultaneously advancing from the east after liberating some of the major cities of the Veneto following General Cialdini's expeditionary corps. The Garibaldians penetrated the Giudicarie, occupying Storo and later defeating the Austrians at Bezzecca in Valle di Ledro. In the east, on the other hand, the division led by General Medici defeated the Austrians at Primolano, Borgo Valsugana and Levico, managing to reach Pergine and Valsorda from where the city of Trent could be seen from above. However, on 22 July Prussia signed a truce with Austria that presaged the Nikolsburg Armistice. Having thus lost the support of Prussia, which had no intention of humiliating Austria or antagonizing France by opposing its agreements with Franz Joseph, Italy was forced to ask in turn for a truce in early August because hundreds of thousands of Austrian soldiers were rushing to the aid of the few remaining troops in Venetia. The prospect of a new confrontation with the full imperial-royal army prompted the Italian generals to halt military operations in Trentino and withdraw under the terms of the armistice of Cormons, which did not recognize any military conquest of Italy, which obtained Veneto only after it was ceded to France.

The War of 1866 thus exposed Trent's vulnerability, especially from the east, a most important front since Trentino now represented an Austrian salient in Italian territory. This then gave way to the final realization of the Fortress of Trent with a continuous ring of forts, batteries and blockhouses around the city and supplementing existing fortifications such as the Bus de Vela barrage and the Rocchetta barrage. The Trent Fortress ring was to be the rear guard of the fortified wall on the border with Italy and was to stop a possible Italian advance if the border forts were unable to contain enemy troops.

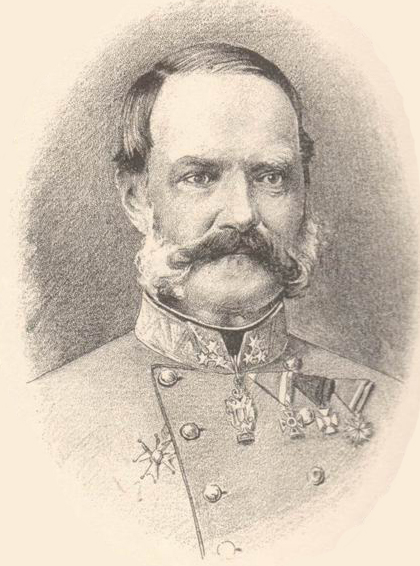
Major General Johann Karl von Huyn (1812–1888), the first person to plan and actually carry out fortification work in Trentino.

After the War of 1866, the fortification plan for Trent was initiated on the basis of the memoirs of von Hyun and Field Marshal and Minister of War Franz Kuhn von Kuhnenfeld (1817–1896), who at the time of the conflict had commanded Austrian troops in the field against the Medici Expeditionary Corps, which envisioned the construction of defensive barrages from the Stelvio Pass to the Sexten Valley, with two strongholds, one in Trent and one in Brixen-Franzensfeste. For this reason, in 1867 the position of director of fortified constructions in South Tyrol was assigned to Colonel Daniel von Salis-Soglio (1826–1919), formerly director of military engineering in Graz. However, the chronic lack of funds for the dual monarchy severely hampered Salis-Scoglio's plans, who succeeded in building only the Civezzano barrage. Between 1878 and 1882, fortification work resumed at the hands of the military commander of Tyrol Lieutenant Field Marshal Franz von Thun und Hohenstein (1826–1888). Once again, the work was affected by the limited financial resources available, and initially only a few field fortifications were built around the city. Later, more substantial financial means enabled the construction of a series of permanent works of a light character, built in stone and in the name of maximum economy of expenditure, baptized already by contemporaries as forts in the Trentino style (Trentiner Stil).

Beginning in 1881, when he became director general of the Innsbruck military engineers, General Julius Vogl (1831–1900) initiated a new series of revisions of fortification plans partly on the basis of the new theory of minimum territorial sacrifice that he advocated. This theory envisioned stopping the enemy directly at the borders, without letting it gain ground until it reached the forts by transforming them into supply and marshalling hubs for troops and materials. However, having failed to build border barrages in Vallagarina and Valsugana, the choice was made to build closer to the city of Trent. This led to the construction of the Romagnano and Mattarello forts south of the city to compensate for the failure to build barrages south of Rovereto. To the east, the Tenna barrier in Valsugana (forts Tenna and Col de le Bene) between the lakes of Levico and Caldonazzo was built instead.

== Permanent works (1860–1900) ==
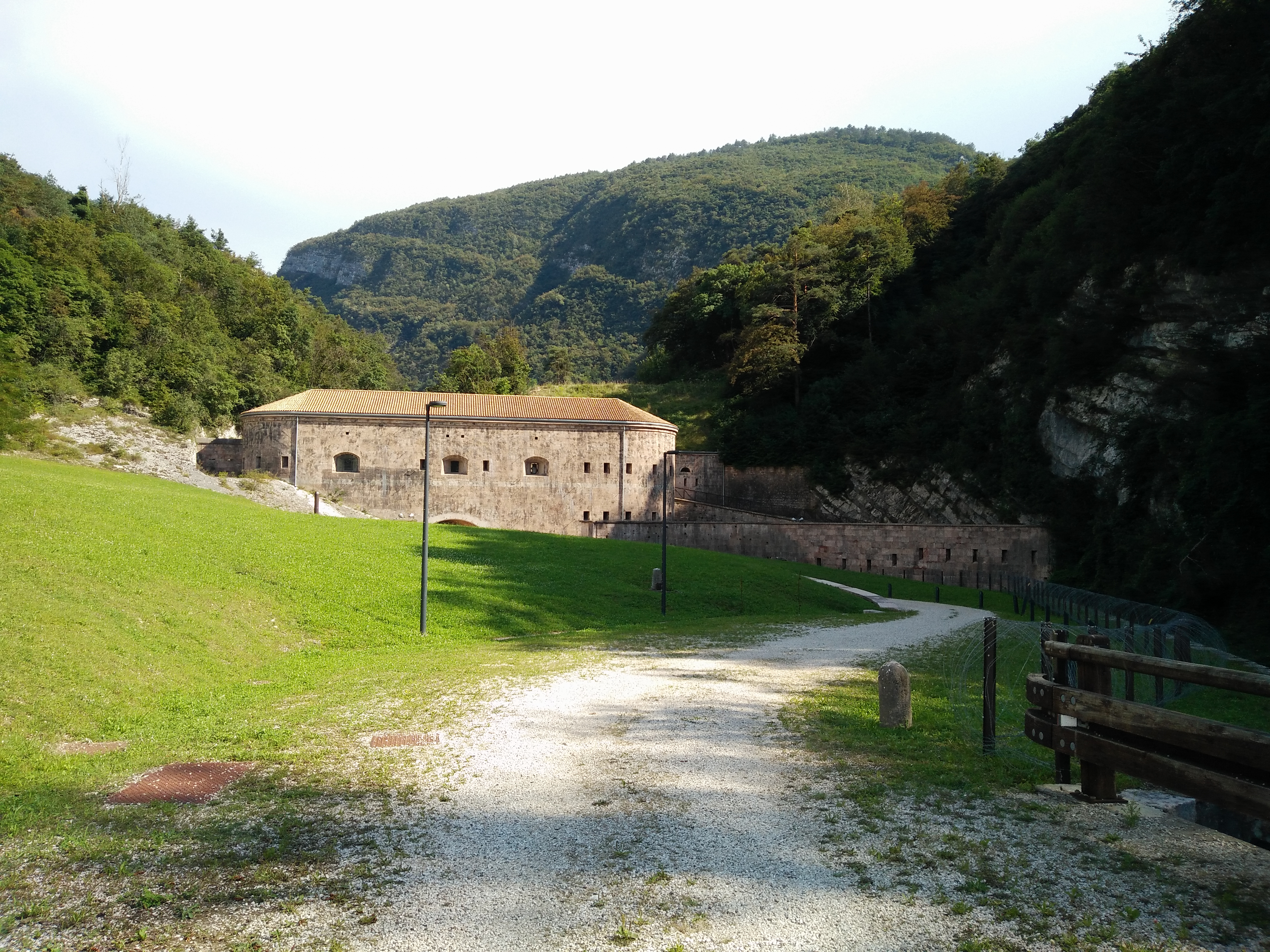
The Bus de Vela Barrage as it appears today after restoration work was completed in 2008. Restoration of the barrage also involved the area in front of the structure to restore it to the appearance it had before the old provincial road was rectified.

The work of fortifying the city of Trent between 1860 and 1900 led to the construction of no less than twenty permanent works including forts, batteries, blockhouses, and road cuts located all around the city. The need to distinguish between permanent and field fortifications also helps to separate the works built up to 1900 from those built later and framed in the modernization of the Trent Fortress in view of the impending war against Italy. From the point of view of definitions, the Italian term forte turns out to be rather vague and is misused today to describe the most diverse fortification works. In contrast, the Vienna Army Corps of Engineers turned out to be rather strict in its definitions and assigned each work to a precise type using few yet clear designations: all fortifications built up to 1915 were defined as Werke, Batterien, Blockhauser; all other fortifications were classified as barrages (Sperren). These four terms were used to define only those fortifications that were included in the official list of the Central Directorate of Military Engineering and were identified by name (e.g., Werk San Rocco, Batterie Martignano, Blockhaus Mandolin, Sperre Bus de Vela, etc.). With the modernization of the Trent fortress, beginning in the spring of 1915, all the old permanent works were disarmed and their weapons assigned to new field fortifications that would later be identified as strongholds, replacement batteries, etc. The permanent works were built in different time frames that can be divided into 4 periods, each of which corresponds to the alternation of a new director of fortification works.

=== First period (1860–1864) ===
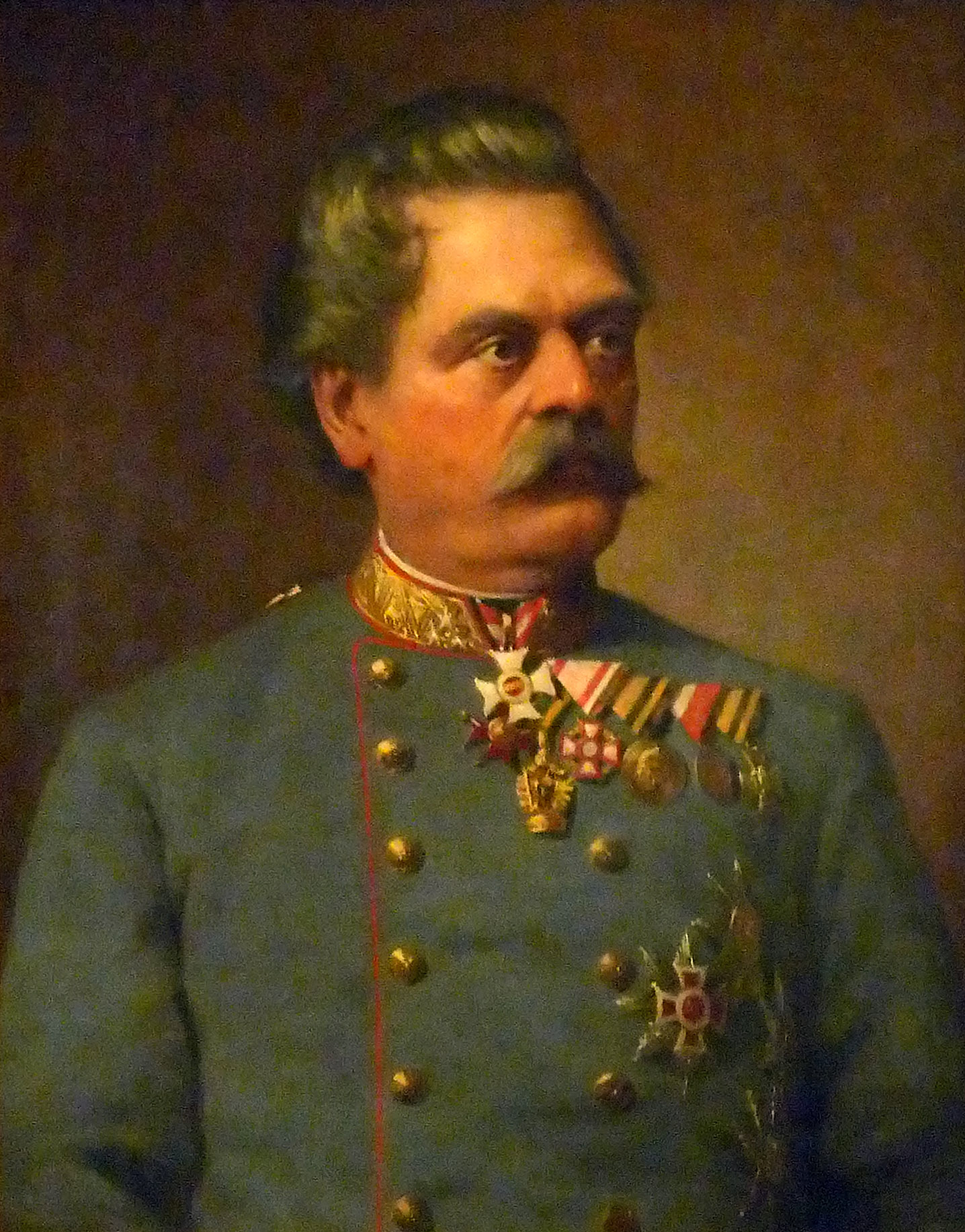
Field Marshal Franz Kuhn von Kuhnenfeld (1817–1896), imperial royal minister of war from 1868 to 1874 and the first to initiate systematic fortification construction in Trentino.

- Bus de Vela roadblock (1860–1862)
- Rocchetta roadblock (1860–1864)
- Doss di Sponde blockhouse (1860–1862)
- Martignano battery (1860–1862)

The fortifications of this period were built to follow Major General Huyn's plans to create a barrage west of Trent to protect the city's flank from any threats that might have come from Lombardy, now part of the newly formed Kingdom of Italy. The Rocchetta Barrage barred the Noce Creek upstream from the Piana Rotaliana to block invaders coming from the Tonale Pass. The Bus de Vela Barrage and the Doss di Sponde Blockhaus served to cover access to Trento from the part of the Valle dei Laghi that was now traversed by a newly built road to connect Trento to Lake Garda. Notably, the Bus de Vela Barrage was impossible to bypass and the only way to reach Trento would have been to tear it down. The Martignano Battery, on the other hand, had the role of supporting these works; its artillery was capable of firing both northward and westward, ensuring adequate coverage over the entire Adige Valley. Dominating the city from above, its cannons also served as a deterrent to any riots that might break out in the city.

The construction technique of these works is typical of the nineteenth century. The preferred building material is stone while the roofs are tiled. The use of earth and crushed stone in the cavities of arches, walls and ceilings was used more for reasons of building stability than to cushion artillery blows. This type of construction might have been effective against bullets or explosive black powder shells, but it would have been hopeless against more modern armor-piercing and/or explosive projectiles. Later, the tiled roof of the Bus de Vela Barrage and the Doss di Sponde Blockhaus would be replaced by a lightweight yet still ineffective concrete roof.

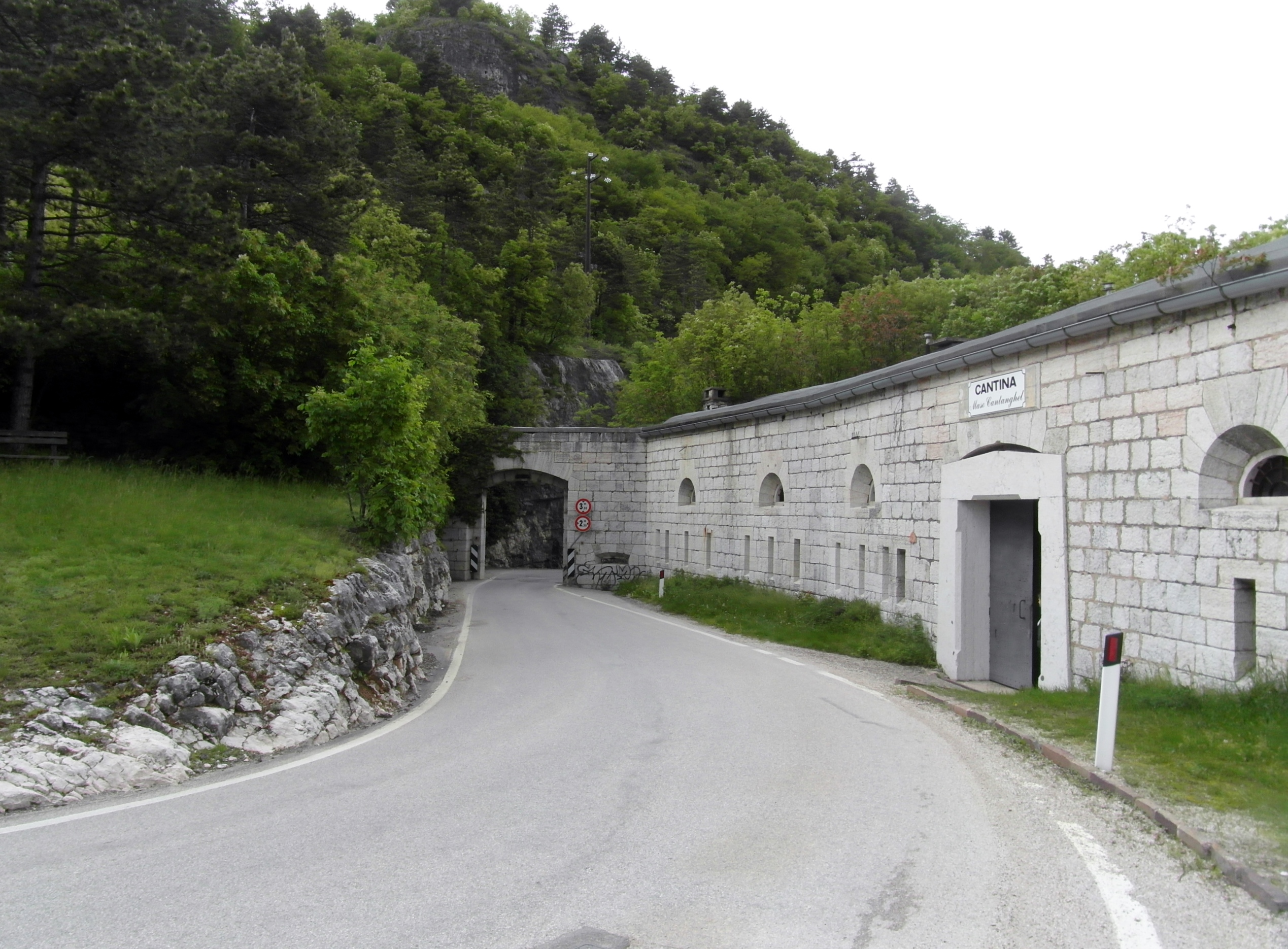
Obere Straßensperre Civezzano (upper road cut) of the fortified complex of Civezzano

=== Second period (1868–1872) ===
- Civezzano fortified complex (1868–1872)

The Civezzano fortifications were designed to provide adequate defenses for the Fersina Gorge, which had been threatened by attackers from Valsugana in 1866. The fortified complex included a main fort and two road cuts placed below it. The construction of these defenses, unnecessary when Venetia was in Austrian hands, became necessary to protect the eastern front of Trent from possible threats from the Kingdom of Italy. Due to heavy financial constraints, this was also the only work built under Salis-Scoglio's direction.

=== Third period: the Trentino style (1877–1883) ===
- Lower Battery of Mattarello (1877–1880)
- Upper Mattarello Battery (1877–1880)
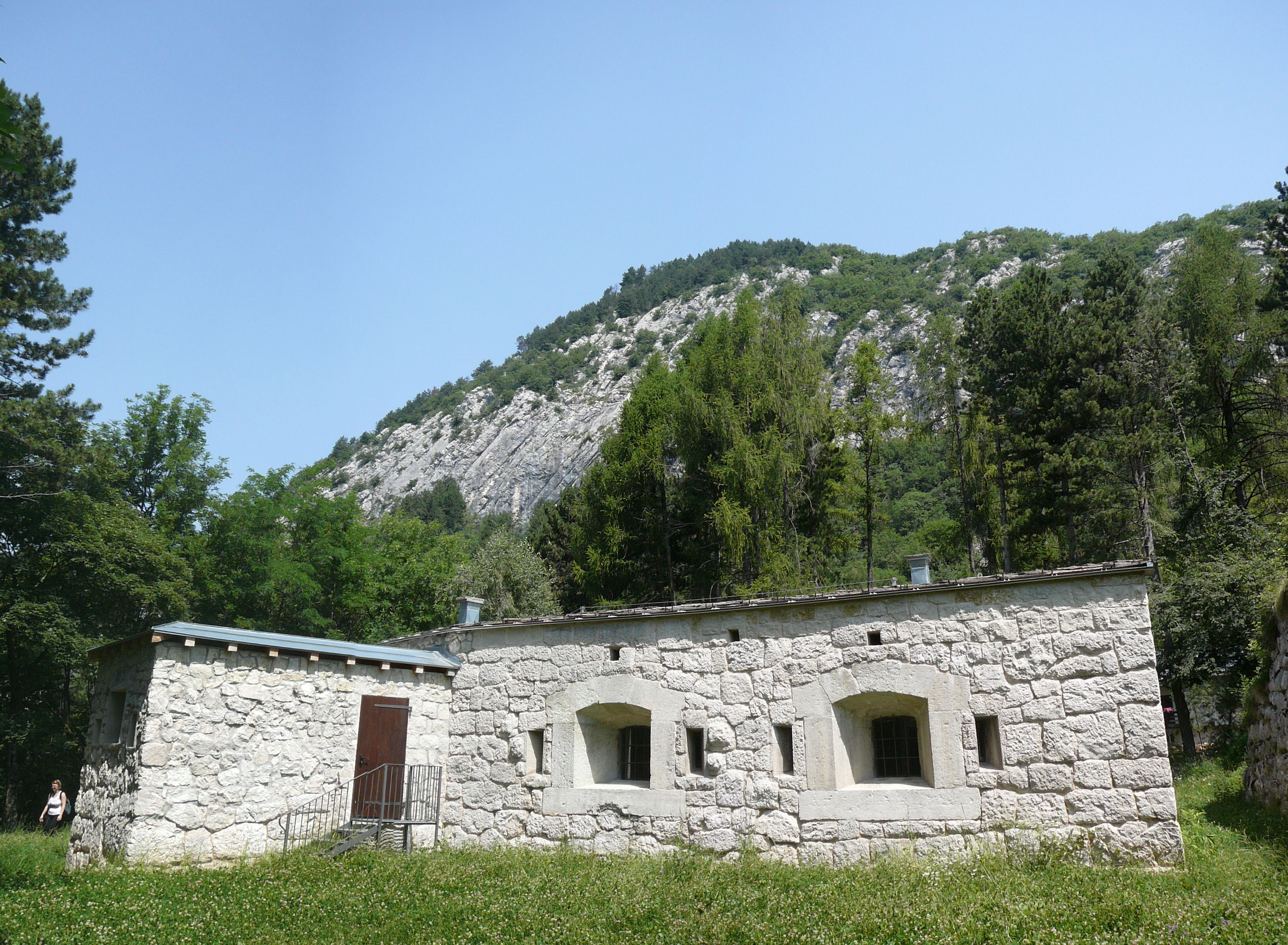
  Roncogno Battery on the slopes of Mount Celva, a typical example of a Trentino-style fortification.
- Mandolin Blockhouse (1880)
- Candriai Battery (1880)
- Brusafer Battery
- Fort Casara
- Cimirlo Battery
- Doss Fornas
- Marzola Battery
- Blockhaus Marzola
- San Rocco works (1881–1883)
- Roncogno Battery (1880–1882)

The defenses erected in this period represent the consolidation of the Trent Fortress on the already protected fronts and the addition of new fortifications on those still unprotected. This is also the period when plans and direction of works were planned by Thun und Hohenstein. The Mandolin blockhaus and Candriai battery on Monte Bondone provided support to the defenses already present in this area. The Cimirlo and Roncogno batteries were erected on the opposite side of the Fersina gorge from the Civezzano fortified complex. Fort Col de le Bene and Fort Tenna blocked the passage through the Valsugana. Batteries Doss Fornas, Marzola, Brusafer, and Blockhaus Marzola defended the communication route between Trento and Altopiano della Vigolana, which was also defended by Fort San Rocco, which could also cover the Adige Valley from Doss di San Rocco. Fort Casara could strike toward both the Adige Valley and Valsugana. The Mattarello batteries, on the other hand, served to block any advances from the south. This is the period that defines the so-called Trentino style. To cope with limited economic resources and to cope with the impossibility of constructing more imposing works, construction materials that could be found directly on the spot were preferred, and the preferred one continued to be stone with practically no cement component while the batteries were in barbette. The first rotating armored domes for howitzers also begin to appear. Fort San Rocco is one of the first within the Austro-Hungarian Empire on which two 12-cm Model 80 cannons were installed in a rotating armored steel dome. At that time the Empire's steel mills still did not produce armored domes, so the one on Fort San Rocco was supplied by the Gruson company of Magdeburg. Later all armored domes installed on Austro-Hungarian forts would be produced by Škoda.

=== Fourth period: the Vogl style (1884–1900) ===
- Tenna works (1884–1890)
- Colle delle benne (1884–1890)
- Mattarello works (1898–1900)
- Romagnano works (1892–1895)

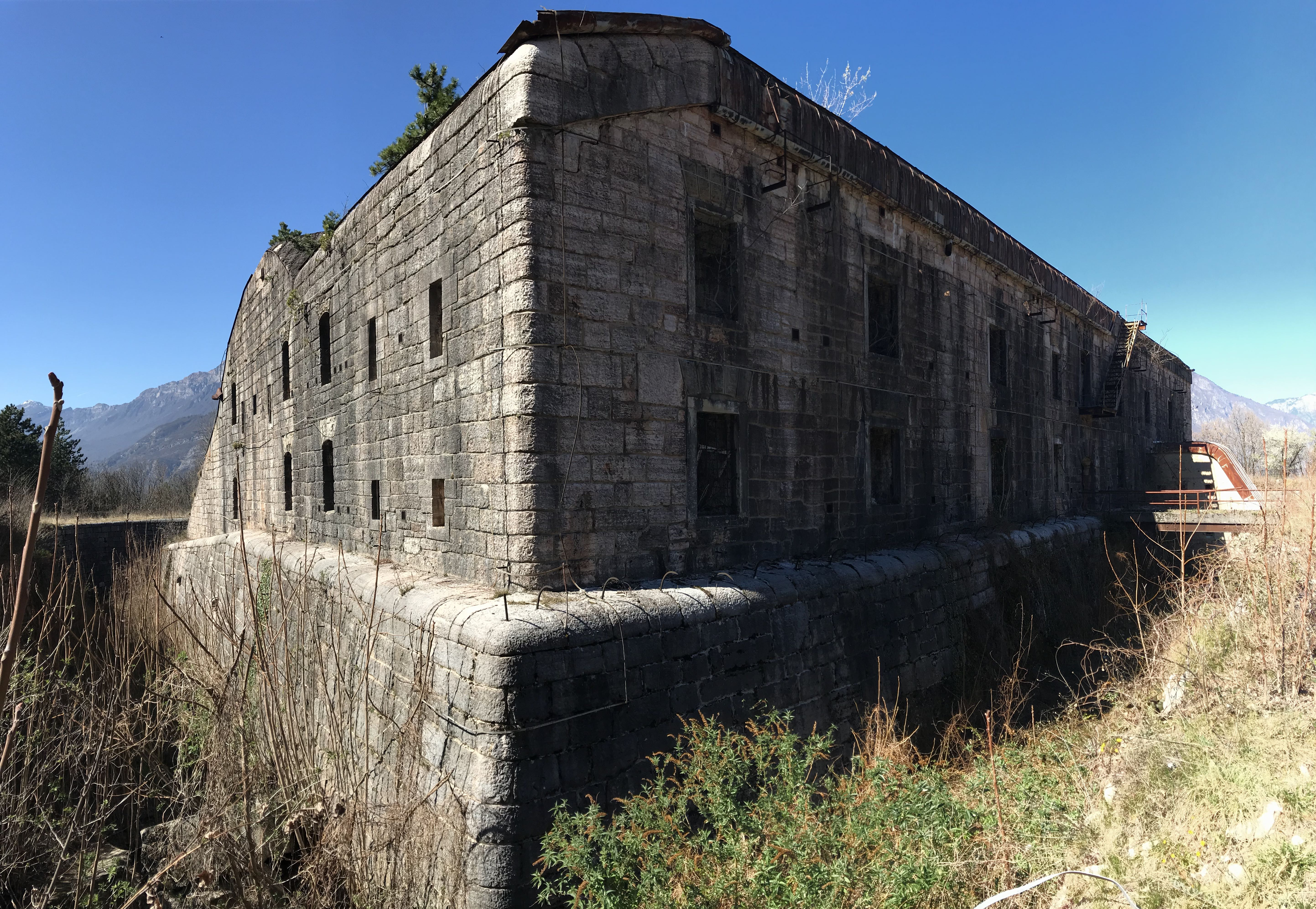
Hauptwerk Mattarello as it looks like in 2019.

These latter constructions represent the last significant consolidation of the Trent Fortress and served to strengthen the defenses to the south and east according to the new defensive strategies set by Julius Vogl. As Vogl was already in command of the Innsbruck military engineering as of 1881, most of the Thun und Hohenstein projects of the earlier period were completed under his direction. To take into account his principle of minimal territorial sacrifice, it was decided to build Forts Tenna and Col de le Benne (Sperre Tenna) as the advanced line of the Fortress of Trent to protect the strategic area of Pergine. Both are built in the early Vogl style and represent a middle ground between this and the Trentino style. Fort Romagnano was built to defend the opposite side of the Adige Valley from the Mattarello batteries and to serve as support for the latter. These were later joined by Fort Mattarello to form a single defensive complex. This fort could block invaders from both Vigolo Vattaro and the Adige Valley. Both forts represent the best example of the final Vogl style. General Vogl introduced the construction of forts in a single block with all rooms, armaments and services concentrated in a single building (Einheitswerk) with a composition of fixed locations and structures that were adapted each time to functional needs, locations and terrain morphology. Artillery pieces were placed in both armored domes and frontal artillery positions. Moreover, even in this period, only locally available material was used for construction. This made it possible to keep costs down and at the same time meet strategic needs. In this period concrete also began to be introduced into the construction of fortifications.

== The fortress in the pre-war period (1900–1914) ==
Although Trent officially received the designation of Fortress in 1899, the new strategies promoted by Vogl first and Franz Conrad von Hötzendorf later, gradually reduced the strategic importance of the Trent stronghold, which was set to play only a role as a secondary defensive line and as an assembly and depot square for men and materials destined for the border sectors. While the concept of a stronghold allowed military expenditures to be reduced to concentrate all defenses in a single area, at the same time it left little room for troops to maneuver in view of large-scale strategic operations. Therefore, for a considerable economic investment, Conrad initiated the fortification of the southern borders of Trentino to withstand the initial shock of an Italian offensive and protect a portion of territory that would allow troops to maneuver in view of an inevitable counteroffensive. Similar fortification works were also planned and initiated along the other borders to protect the region with a belt of steel. The inadequacy of the defensive infrastructure of the Trent Fortress was also beginning to become apparent and its effectiveness was seriously questioned by the highest ranks of the Austrian military hierarchy. Therefore, it was decided to carry out a decisive rearrangement followed by targeted consolidation works.

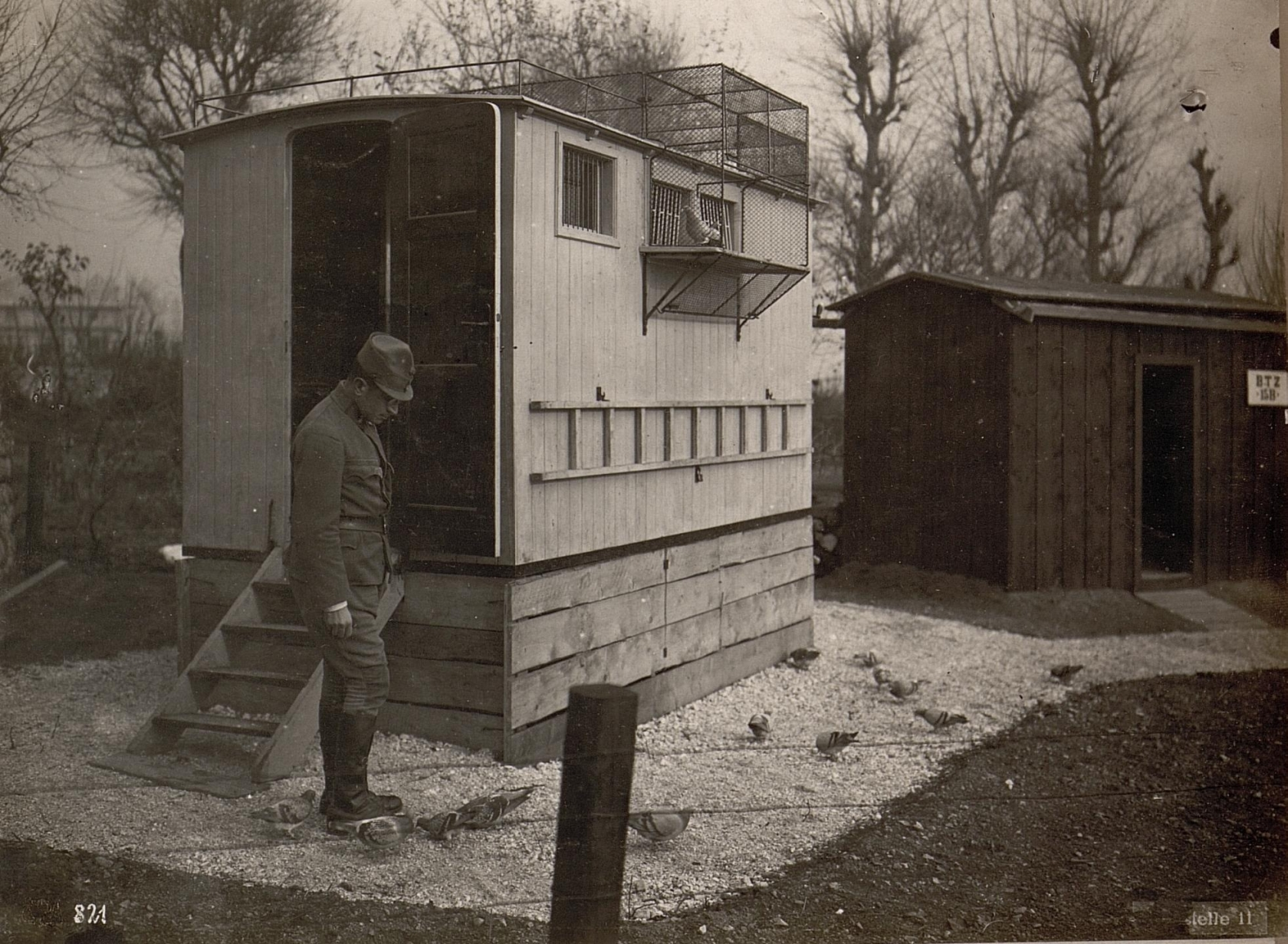
Homing pigeon station on Doss Trento.

In 1907, however, it was decided to proceed with reinforcing the western front of the Fortress, which turned out to be both the most unguarded and the least protected by the border barrages. Because of this, Mount Bondone began to be the object of interest of the Austro-Hungarian military and was declared a military zone and forbidden to civilians. The first works involved the construction of a firing range at Viote and the military road necessary to reach it. This was joined by a series of other buildings used as barracks and depots. The construction of this infrastructure was part of the Fortress' new role as a training and marshalling center. In addition, the new range avoided the need to travel to Innsbruck for firing exercises. At the same time, some field posts on the western side of the mountain to guard the Valle dei Laghi, such as the artillery stronghold on Cima Palon, were built. The new Lavarone-Folgaria barrage and the Adige-Vallarsa barrage would provide adequate cover for the southeastern front, and these new forts were relied upon to prevent any rapid advances toward the Trento Fortress. In contrast, the western front was partially unprotected. A quick advance by the enemy could easily have reached the gates of the Trent. Therefore, it was decided to decisively reinforce the western front of the Fortress and to build a defensive line on the slopes of Mount Bondone facing the Valle dei Laghi and on the slopes of Soprasasso. Fortification work on Bondone continued in 1910 under the leadership of Major General Anton Schiesser, director of the Trent Engineer Corps. Still seeking maximum economy of expense, the field fortifications built during this period consisted mostly of open-air emplacements or covered with wood and loam or a few concrete casemates. While effective, they were not protected from wear and tear from continuous shelling.

Also during the same period, Doss Trento was also closed to civilians because of the presence of important military infrastructure: an ammunition factory and depot, barracks, pigeon station, depots, and a battery facing the city whose purpose was also to act as a deterrent for possible riots in the city. Today, few traces remain of all the structures on Doss Trento because it was decided in the Fascist era to erase all visible traces of Trento's Habsburg past. However, some secondary, and therefore less visible, works were spared in order to change their purpose: the ammunition depot served as a pavilion for the National Historical Museum of the Alpini; some underground storage rooms were also preserved and used as anti-aircraft shelters during World War II; the access portal with its pedestrian access guard post from Piedicastello is also still there.

=== The division into sectors ===
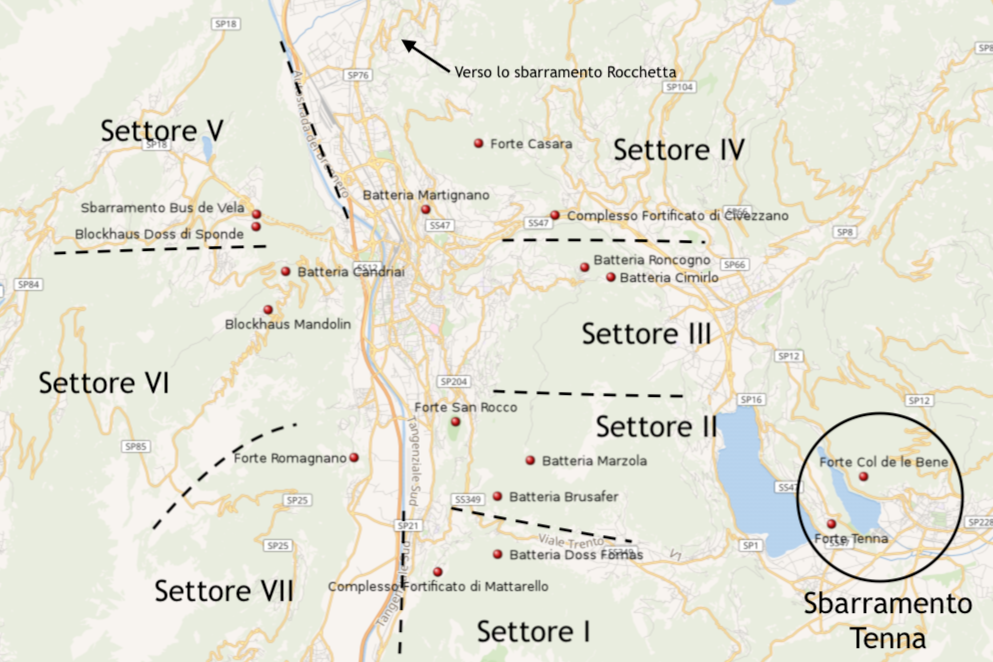
Map of the fortress with the location of permanent structures and their division into sectors.

Also in the same period, to better define the competencies of each fortification and rationalize the units to be assigned to it, the territory surrounding the city of Trent was divided into sectors with the city district corresponding roughly to the urban belt at the center. Initially there were 4 defensive sectors, later the number of sectors increased to 5. This division remained in effect until 1914, when the number of sectors became 7. To these was added the Sperre Tenna (Tenna Barrage) comprising forts Tenna and Col de le Bene in Valsugana, and in 1915 the new underground Busa Grande (Ersatzwerk Busa Grande) to replace the antiquated fort Colle delle benne.

These sectors, each divided into several subgroups, were numbered counterclockwise starting from the southeast.

- Sector I: from the left bank of the Adige River to Mattarello and up to the hamlet of Valsorda;
- sector II: from Valsorda to the Stoi peak of the Chegul on the Marzola;
- sector III: from Chegul to the Fersina gorge;
- sector IV: from the Fersina gorge to the Adige River;
- sector V: from the Adige River to the Bus de Vela;
- sector VI: from Sopramonte to the top of Palon del Bondone;
- sector VII: from the top of Palon del Bondone to the right bank of the Adige River.

== The fortress in the Great War ==
The outbreak of war led to another radical rearrangement of the Trent Fortress. The neutrality assumed by Italy in the face of the events of August 1914 convinced the military command in Innsbruck to accelerate fortification work along the borders with the neighboring ally: thus, the construction of a continuous entrenched camp from the Stelvio to the Marmolada was started, which took the name of the Tyrolean line of resistance (Tiroler Widerstandslinie). Moreover, most of the border barrages originally planned by Conrad were never realized, and only the Lavarone-Folgaria and Tonale Pass barrages were completed in time. The biggest problem, however, was that the permanent works of the Trent stronghold were obsolete and totally unsuitable for modern warfare: the forts and batteries had been built according to 19th-century concepts, and the construction technique of stone and concrete reinforced with steel beams would not have withstood the impact of the blows of the most modern siege guns; moreover, they represented easy targets because their position was known and they were also clearly visible from afar. Only the modern forts of the Lavarone-Folgaria barrage, built between 1900 and 1915, provided adequate standards of protection for modern artillery due to the massive adoption of reinforced concrete. Consequently, if the Italian offensive had overwhelmed the border defenses, the Fortress of Trent would have found itself completely unprepared. However, the armament of the Trent Fortress still represented an invaluable strategic value, and it was therefore decided to dismantle all the permanent nineteenth-century works by relocating cannons and howitzers to field emplacements both outdoors and in caves and built from scratch.

=== Field fortifications ===
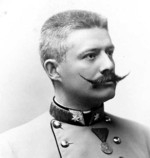
Franz Edler von Steinhart

It was from the end of 1914 that the construction of field fortifications, then under the leadership of the new Director of the Trent Army Corps of Engineers Franz Edler von Steinhart, accelerated sharply in all areas. Steinhart (b. Weisskirchen, 20 March 1865), who had landed in Italy in 1898 after gaining experience in the Army Corps of Engineers in Kraków, Bilek, and Przemyśl, had contributed to the planning of the Riva del Garda fortress and on 25 April 1914, was appointed director general of the Corps of Engineers and later promoted to Generalmajor.

The town was completely surrounded by a seamless entrenched camp, articulated in depth and equipped with entrenchments, road barricades, strongholds, and rock-cut batteries. Steinhart was personally responsible for working out many details concerning the construction of the new field posts, and it was he who actively promoted the construction of cave fortifications so that they would be virtually invulnerable to enemy artillery. The idea behind Steinhart's planning was to create a fortified wall that would be purely defensive. Cave shelters and fortifications would have allowed the defenders to remain protected during heavy shelling and then only come out into the open when enemy infantry began to advance. The typical armament of the fortress also had no offensive characteristics, but cannons and howitzers were devoted exclusively to close defense in anticipation of a counter offensive from outside that would break the siege.

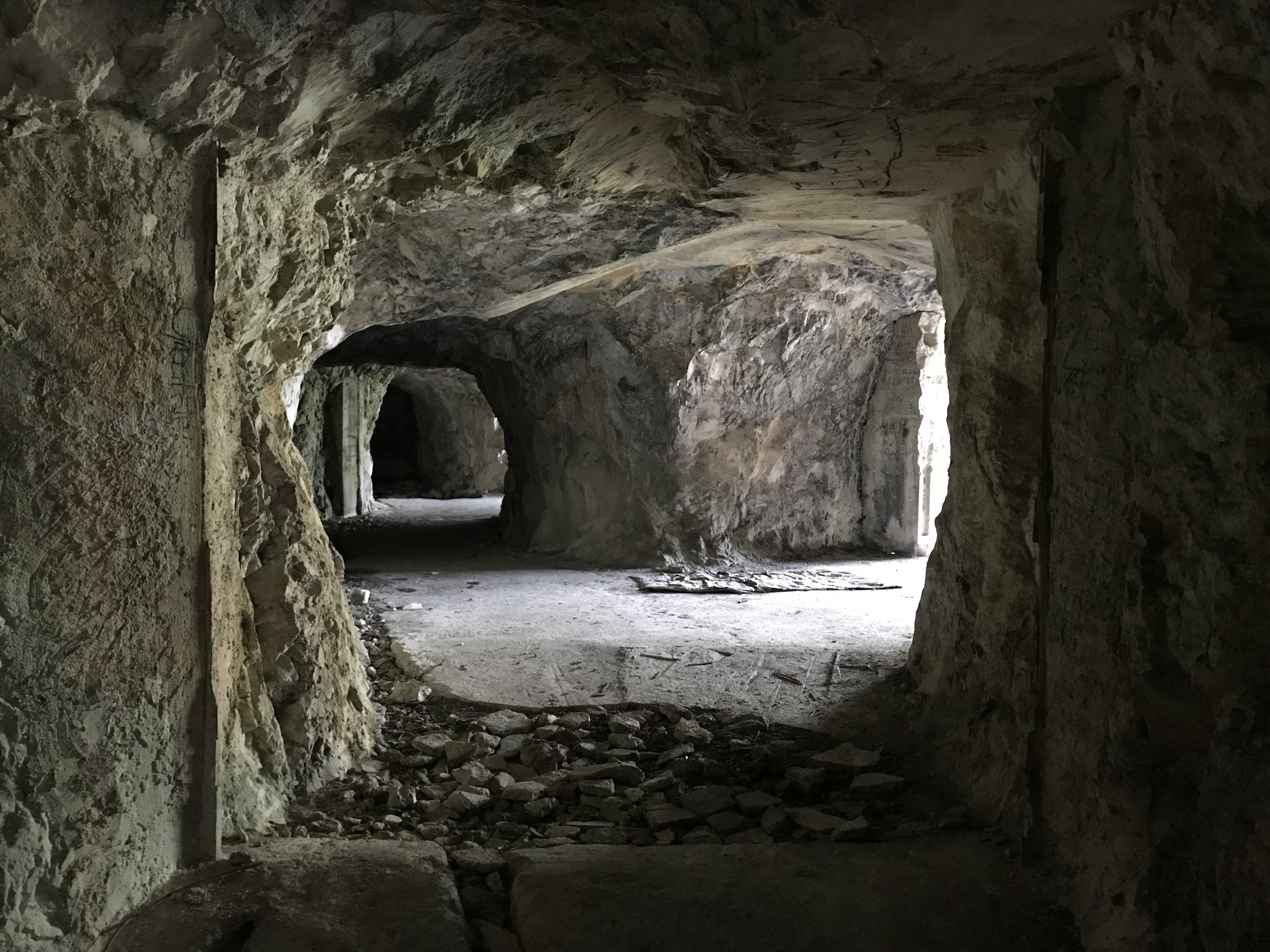
Example of cave work on Mount Celva as it looks like in 2019.

Beginning in the spring of 1915 and continuing until the following August, the old permanent fortifications began to be dismantled to transfer their armaments to the new field positions that were being completed. The armored domes with their howitzers were transferred to purpose-built cave batteries that were virtually impossible to destroy: the only elements that emerged from the rock were the domes, which represented a small target that was difficult to locate; the rest of the battery lay under several meters of rock. An example of these batteries is the armored fort Zampetta, where the howitzers of Fort Mattarello were transferred, and the battery on Mount Calisio, where the howitzers of Fort Romagnano were transferred. The rest of the guns were installed in open-air field emplacements, each equipped with a depot and underground shelter such as those in the Romagnano and Mattarello area, or in caves. Instead of armored domes, in forts now abandoned or used for storage, false concrete domes were installed with logs simulating cannons. It is also worth mentioning that all these emplacements were interspersed with trenches that ran almost uninterruptedly from one work to the next. Another of the victims of the Fortress modernization was the Civezzano barrage: the main fort was dismantled, blown up in the summer of 1915 and its guns were placed in field batteries located nearby. The upper road cut was also dismantled and adapted as an infantry stronghold: the closure of the two inner courtyards with a concrete roof probably dates from this period. Of the old nineteenth-century barrage only the lower roadside cut-off with its three cannons in a cave and the nearby blockhouse on the railway line remained efficient.

It is almost impossible to give an accurate account of the time and place of construction of every field post built after 1914. However, in addition to the works already mentioned, it is worth mentioning some of the places where the most massive work was done: Cornetto peak, Palon peak and the entire northern ridge of Mount Bondone, Castellar de la Groa, Mount Soprassasso, the armored fort on Mount Celva, Meransen. By this time, the old decommissioned stone constructions, now referred to as Steinkästen (stone piles), had the sole task of acting as false targets and drawing enemy fire upon themselves. These modernization works according to modern criteria contributed to making Trent one of the most modern and fearsome fortresses on the entire Western Front despite never having been tested by fire. Moreover, the great battles of World War I that took place around fortified strongholds (Verdun and Przemyśl) show that any direct attack on the Trent Fortress would have resulted in a bloody siege with little chance of success for anyone who undertook a direct attack.

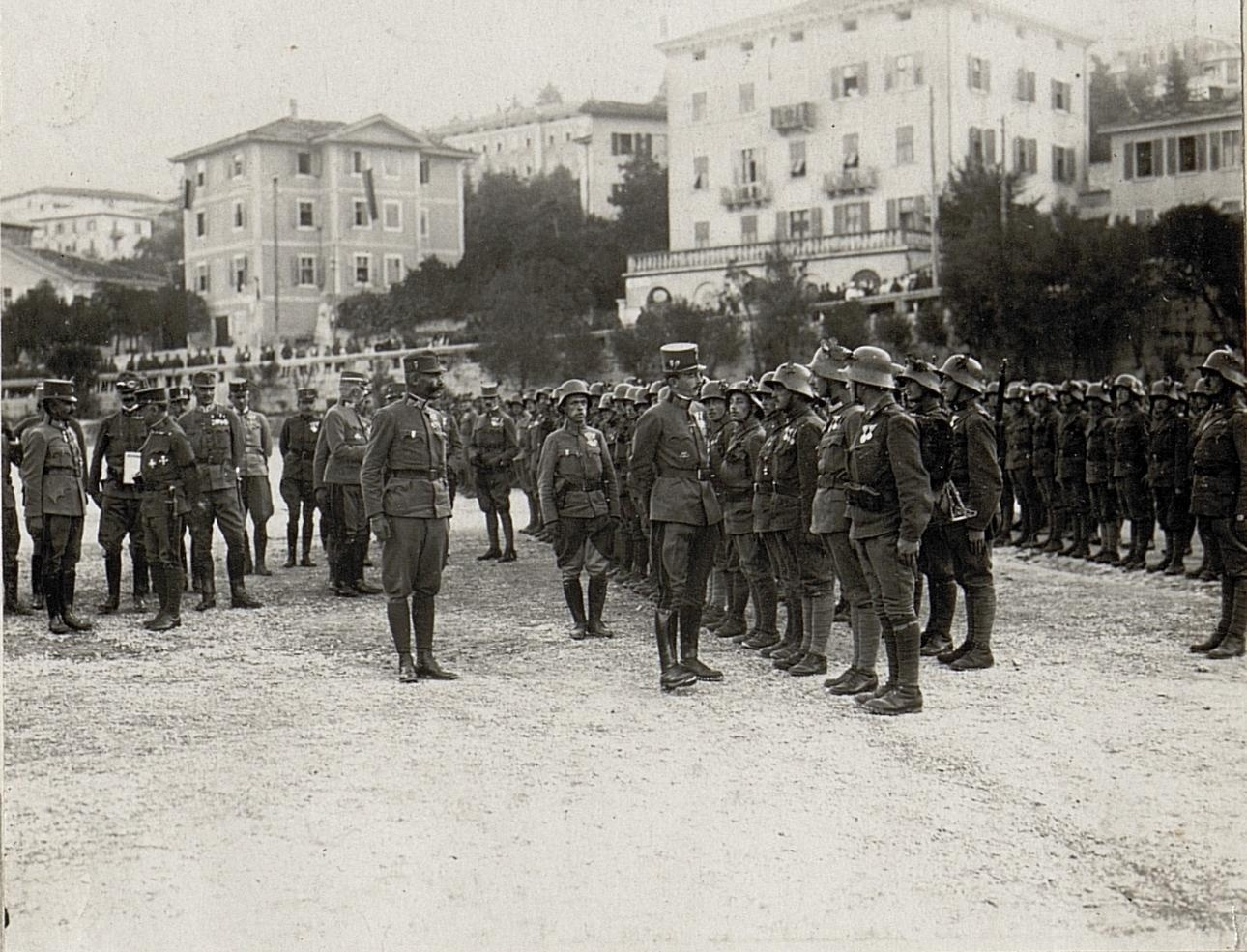
Emperor Charles I of Austria reviews the 59th Infantry Regiment in the parade ground (today Piazza Venezia – 13 September 1917).

=== Other infrastructures of the fortress ===
Trent's strategic role did not end at its status as a fortress but contemplated a whole series of infrastructures that were crucial both to the maintenance of the fortress itself and to the Austrian war effort. The city itself was considered an important industrial and communications center of the Dolomite front. The Gardolo railroad yard, pandering to Conrad's strategy that Trent represented one of the most important marshalling centers on the Western Front, made it possible to move a huge amount of men and materials, which could then be marshalled to the front with a complex system of cable cars (for goods only) that reached the most inaccessible locations in the Fortress and the front and with a loading capacity of several hundred tons of goods per day. For example, as many as three cable cars departed from Mattarello, reaching Viote on Bondone (5 km), Vezzena peak in Valsugana (23.35 km) and Casara (13.8 km). These, too, after the disbandment of the Fortress, were dismounted and moved to more strategic sectors of the front. It is estimated, however, that between 1916 and 1918 245 cable cars were in service in Trentino, with a total length of 550 km. The mechanical workshops (Romagnano, Ravina and Gardolo) and ammunition factories (Doss Trento) then took care of the Fortress's subsistence. There was also an airfield in Gardolo where Flik 17 was stationed, later transferred to Pergine Valsugana, while the central radio-telegraph station was located in Ravina. Also in Gardolo was a prison camp where prisoners from the Eastern Front were held.

=== Dissolution ===
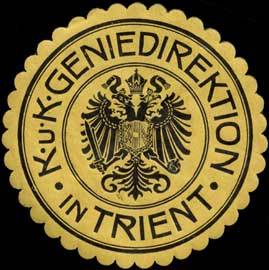
Seal of the imperial royal directorate of military engineering in Trent.

Despite the extensive fortification work undertaken, the Trent Fortress never had the test of fire. In 1915, Italian advances never got beyond the gates of Rovereto to the south, Riva del Garda to the southwest and Borgo Valsugana to the east. The forts of the Lavarone barrage assumed their task by blocking any attempt to advance despite the extensive damage sustained in the first days of the war. Following the Strafexpedition of May 1916, the front moved significantly away from Trent and the resulting positional warfare prompted the Austrians to consider any threat of an Italian advance on the Dolomite front to have receded. From then on General Cadorna's attentions would also shift exclusively to the Karst front, relegating the Trentino front to a secondary theater of war. Consequently, it was decided to dissolve the Fortress and most of the artillery pieces were transferred to the front in sectors where they were most needed. The few remaining active positions were converted into anti-aircraft positions.

After 1916, the role of guarding the city was entrusted to the Standschützen, which consisted mainly of non-servicemen from Trentino. These continued to guard the fortress wall, which remained interdicted to civilians, and were mainly concerned with searching for deserters and escaped prisoners. A series of road barrages also remained active both to the south (Casteller and Romagnano barrages), east (Civezzano), north (Gardolo and Cognola), and west (Roncafort and Vela). Nets of electrified barbed wire extended both north and south of the city.

== Armament ==
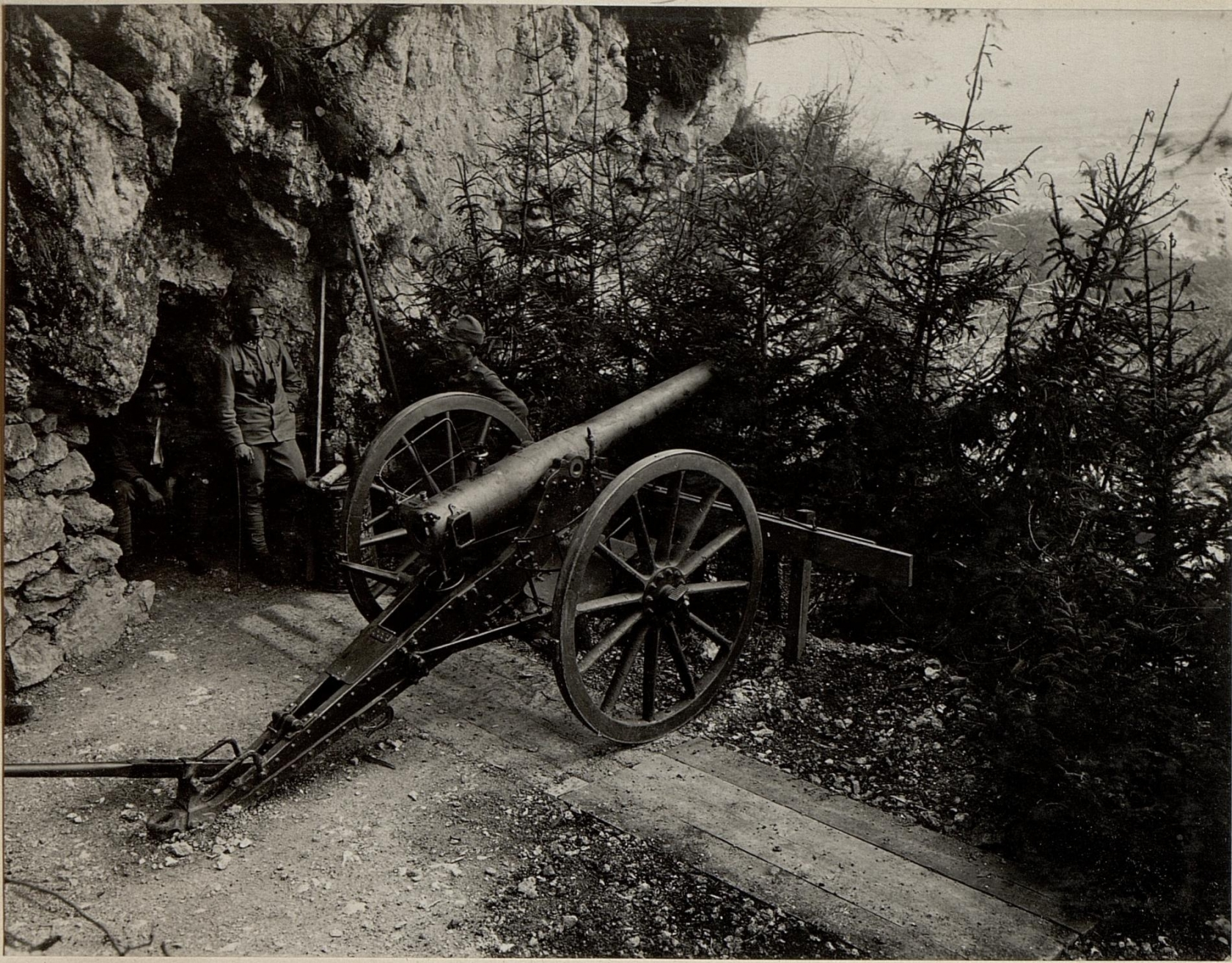
9 cm Feldkanone M. 75 in position on Mount Javorcek in Slovenia.

The main armament of the Trent Fortress reflects the typical defensive armament of the imperial and royal army despite not being equipped with the most modern cannons in service at the outbreak of World War I. Since the fortress was active as early as the second half of the 19th century, the armaments were constantly updated, and the types listed here refer to those listed in the official documents of 1914 for a total of 237 cannons, which became 420 in 1915. Not mentioned here are armaments considered secondary such as machine guns and small-caliber rapid-fire cannons.

=== Field cannons ===
- 7 cm Gebirgsgeschütz M. 75
- 8 cm Feldkanone M. 94
- 9 cm Feldkanone M. 75/96
- 9 cm Feldkanone M. 04

=== Cannons ===
- 12 cm Kanone M. 61
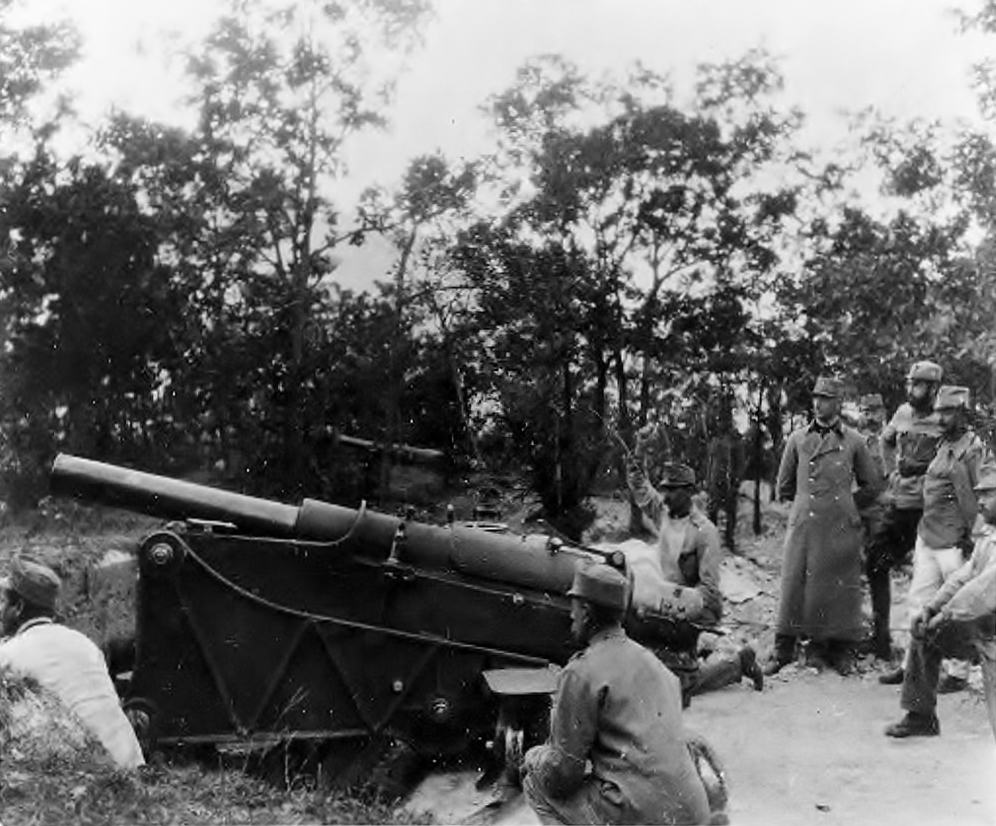
  One of the 12-cm M. 96 cannons at Pianizza battery site in Trent.
- 12 cm Kanone M. 80
- 12 cm Kanone M. 96
- 15 cm Kanone M. 61
- 15 cm Kanone M. 80

=== Field howitzers ===
- 10 cm Feldhaubitze M. 99
- 15 cm Feldhaubitze M. 99

=== Howitzers ===
- 15 cm Mörser M. 78
- 15 cm Mörser M. 80

== The militarized city (1914–1918) ==
Trent's fortress status was also greatly reflected in the urban and social fabric of the city before and during the war. As mentioned earlier, many of the places around the city were forbidden to civilians. Later this prohibition also extended to the so-called building radius, i.e., that area around each fortress where there was an absolute (within a radius of 570 m) and conditional (within the next 570 m) prohibition on building. The effect of this rule in peacetime was not only a series of constraints on the owners of the land included in the area, but also a loss of the value of the land itself. In wartime the building ban radius also required the demolition of existing buildings so as not to obstruct artillery fire. Many city buildings also housed commands and entire areas of the city were reserved for the military even before the outbreak of hostilities. For example, the area behind the Trento Court, between Grazioli Street and Barbacovi Street, housed the Madruzzo barracks. The present gardens of Piazza Venezia were the parade ground. In place of today's Raffaello Sanzio elementary school stood the San Martino barracks next to the Buonconsiglio Castle, which was the headquarters of the Trento Fortress command and the military court. Today's courthouse, on the other hand, was home to Trento's Directorate of Military Engineering. Dozens of other infrastructures were scattered throughout the city, mainly bakeries and kitchens, capable of churning out up to ten thousand meals a day.

Trent's involvement in the Great War began as early as July 1914 when a new set of rules began to take effect that would remain in effect for the duration of the conflict. At the end of the month, Paragraph 14 was implemented, suspending almost all individual freedoms and rights. Mail was censored and the publication of many newspapers suspended. From then on, civilian life would be militarized. Even symbolic community places in the city were earmarked for military use: squares were turned into garages or open-air warehouses and community places were gradually abandoned. In addition, in 1914 the mayor of Trent was provided with a list of public buildings to be placed at the immediate disposal of the fortress command, and at the outbreak of hostilities with Italy every available private accommodation was made available to officers and troops, industries and businesses were converted to military use while dwellings also made available for a wide variety of needs (canteens, public baths, laundries, etc.). In many cases laws providing for reimbursements for quartering with private individuals were not respected. In addition, citizens' property was requisitioned rather than expropriated, but the procedures for reparations were lengthy and cumbersome due to bureaucracy, and compensation was often not deemed adequate by the population. It is also estimated that everything that was not requisitioned was stolen by low-rank soldiers.

Another critical factor for the population of Trent was the almost absolute lack of doctors for the civilian population. Most were recalled to serve in the field, some were interned, and those who remained in the city were assigned to provide care only for military personnel. A pharmacy service was still guaranteed in the city, but health care for civilians would be inadequate for the entire duration of the war. Two hospital complexes were provided for the military, which included, among others, the buildings of today's Liceo Classico Leonardo da Vinci and Liceo Scientifico Galileo Galilei. Buildings on Via Verdi were also used as medical facilities.

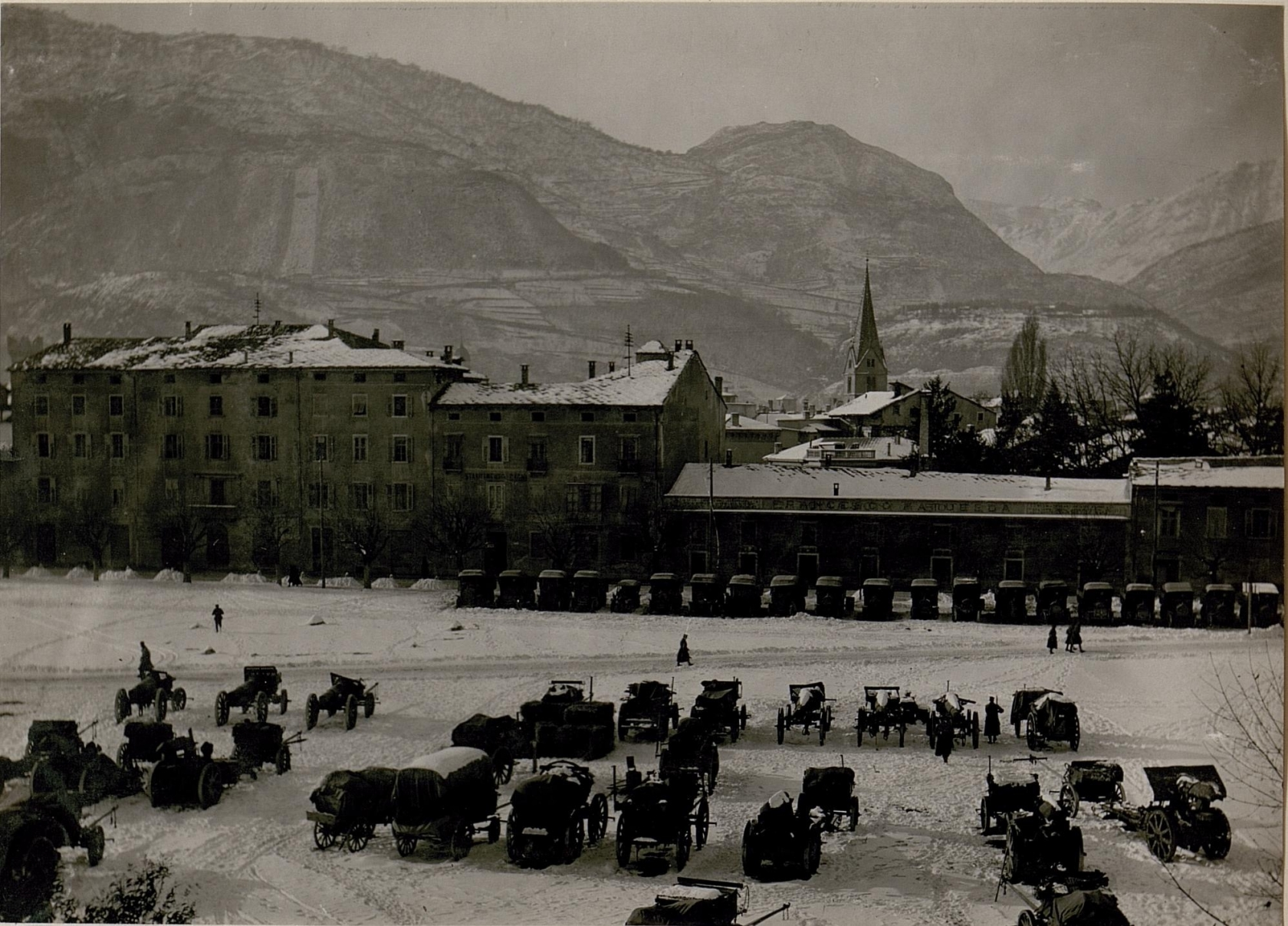
The area where the gardens of Piazza Venezia stand today used as a parade ground (1918).

The gradual influx of military personnel into the city counterbalanced the exodus of the civilian population. Mass mobilization was proclaimed on 31 July 1914 year and about 55,000 Trentinians left for the front. In total, 61,979 Trentinians were enlisted during the course of the war, and the casualties are estimated at 12,000. Of the approximately 32,000 inhabitants of Trent in 1914, as many as 15,129 served in the ranks of the Austro-Hungarian army between 1914 and 1918; of these, 1,150 died in the field. In addition, about half of the city's inhabitants were evacuated at the outbreak of hostilities with Italy, and only those who were considered indispensable to the life of the city and those who could prove that they could provide for their own subsistence for at least four months were allowed to stay. Those who had the means were invited to move at their own expense to the Trentino valleys far from the front. The rest were evacuated and participated in what is now known as the Trentino exodus involving more than 75,000 refugees. Public figures suspected of pro-Italian sentiments and of not being loyal to the emperor were placed under preventive arrest and pending trial interned in the Katzenau camp. In July 1915, the military authorities further reduced the number of people allowed to remain in Trent and tightened control over access to the city. From then on, no more than 7–8,000 inhabitants remained in Trent. At the same time, it is estimated that the number of military personnel in the city rose from 3,000 men in 1910 (10 percent of the population) to about 150,000 in 1916. Soon measures were also taken with regard to supply, and rationing would become increasingly severe until 1918, mirroring a shortage of necessities that was becoming increasingly acute.

The purge of public office affected, among others, the then mayor of Trent Vittorio Zippel, an avowed irredentist, who was removed from office on 20 May 1915. After moving with his family to Val di Non, he was forced to move to the Katzenau camp where he was later arrested before being sentenced to eight years in prison. In July 1917 he benefited from an amnesty and was freed. Zippel's place was taken by Adolfo de Bertolini, who was appointed the city's unofficial administrator. The bishop of Trent, Celestino Endrici, was also persecuted for not showing sufficiently patriotic feelings toward the war.

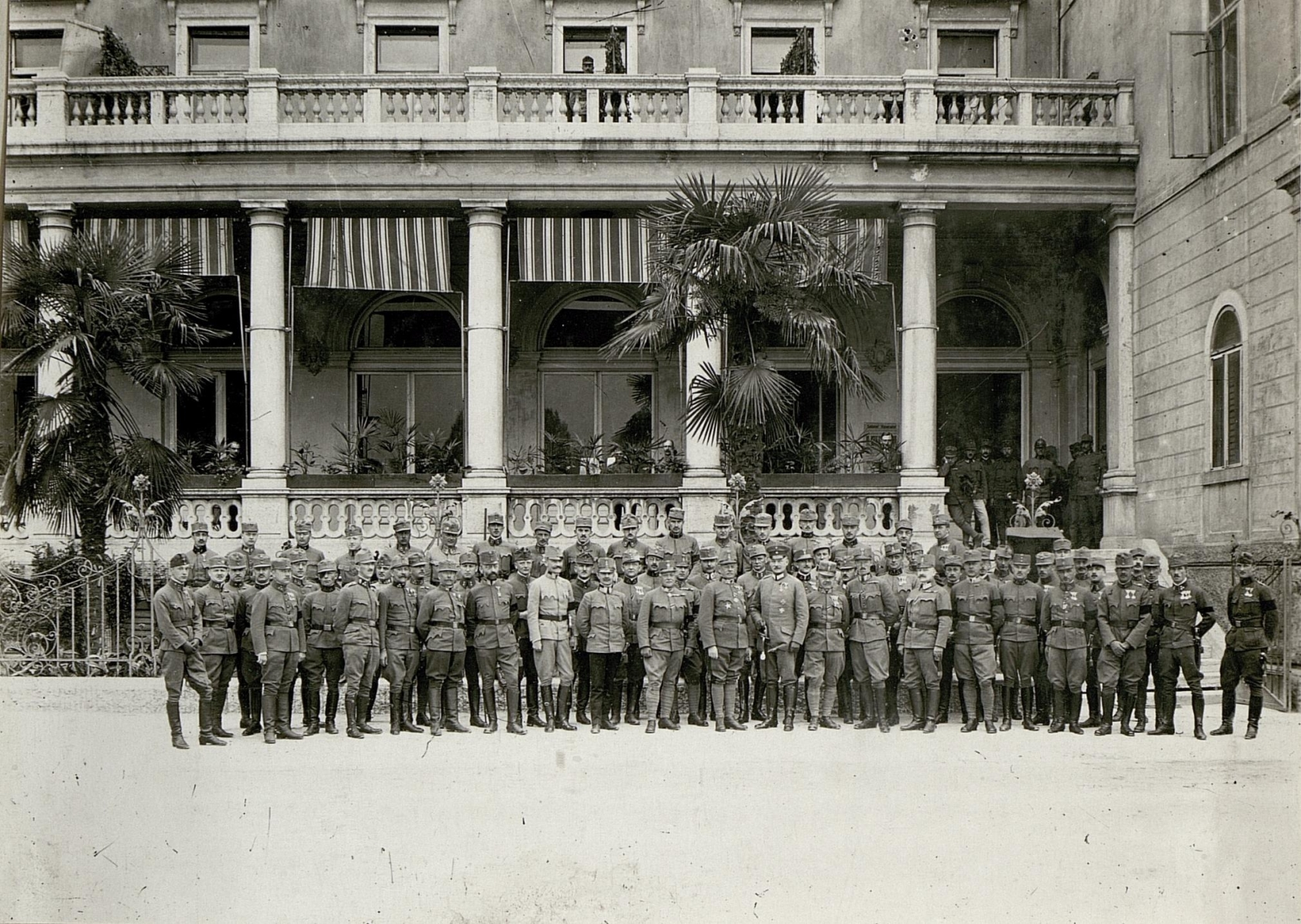
Group photo of 11th Army officers in front of the Trento Hotel in Dante Square, now the Palace of the Province.

In May 1916, the trial of Irredentist Damiano Chiesa from Rovereto, who was captured on Mount Zugna during the Punitive Expedition and sentenced to death for treason, took place in Trent. He was shot in the Cervara Pit of the Buonconsiglio Castle on 19 May. In July of the same year, Cesare Battisti and Fabio Filzi were captured on Monte Corno della Vallarsa (now known as Monte Corno Battisti). Recognized and transported to Trent amid the abuses of the Austrian military, they were imprisoned in Buonconsiglio Castle. Subjected to a speedy trial they were sentenced to death for high treason by halter. The sentence was carried out on 12 July in the Cervara Trench.

As the months passed, the situation in Trent became increasingly distressing for the remaining population. The famine of 1917 depleted food supplies for the weaker sections of the population, and medicines, already in short supply for the civilian population, became increasingly scarce. The Spanish flu also began to claim its first victims the following year. In the final weeks of the war, as all forms of authority in an empire that was now in crisis, soldiers and ordinary citizens indulged in looting of military stores and warehouses. 1918 also opened with Bertolini's dismissal as city administrator. He was accused of treason and removed from office on 4 January, and his place was taken by Josef Jordan. At the end of October 1918, a power vacuum began to appear in the city's administration, and on 2 November a provisional government was formed, which, when the Italian troops entered the city, was replaced by General Guglielmo Pecori Giraldi, who was appointed administrator of the entire region, from Borghetto to Brenner. In 1919 his place was taken by Luigi Credaro, and it was not until January 1922 that the first municipal elections since the end of the war were held.

== From the early postwar period to the present ==
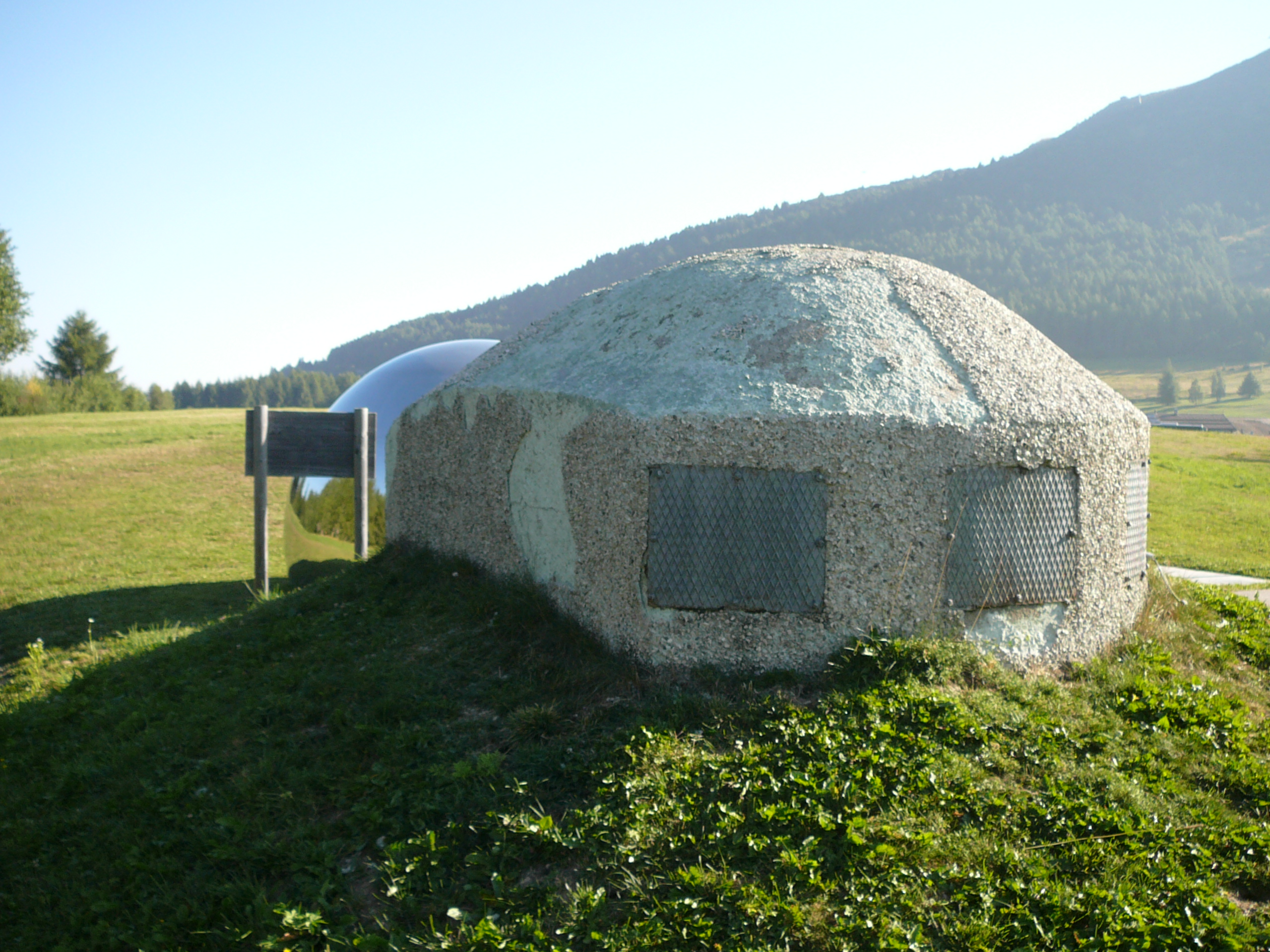
Former shooting range at Viote.

Since the fighting never reached Trent, the Fortress structures reached the end of World War I intact. As these were military structures, in 1918 the most important permanent works passed to the military domain under the jurisdiction of the Royal Army, which repurposed them as powder magazines, depots, or troop quarters. The other structures and field fortifications, on the other hand, were simply abandoned and integrated into privately owned or state property. All visible structures on Doss Trento were completely destroyed to erase all traces of the Habsburg past and build the Cesare Battisti Mausoleum and the Alpine Acropolis, which was never realized. The remainder was put to other uses. During the 1920s two accidental explosions caused the complete destruction of the Lower Mattarello Battery and the Rocchetta Barrage. Very few traces of the latter also remain due to road rectification work.

During World War II, the various underground shelters and depots from Doss Trento to Mattarello were repurposed as air raid shelters to escape Allied bombing and then abandoned again. Later, starting in the 1950s, the military property began to dispose of the various works in its possession, which were purchased by private individuals or given to local authorities. Only a few continued to be used until the 1980s (e.g., forts San Rocco and Mattarello) and then also sold off. The Viote shooting range also continued to serve its purpose until the 1980s when it was ceded to the state property. Today there is a small astronomical observatory there while some of the villas used as barracks at the time now lie abandoned and awaiting redevelopment.

Nowadays, having never fired a shot, the Trent Fortress has been essentially forgotten by both historical and collective memory. Few studies have been devoted to it, and only a few local history experts are aware of what Trent Fortress and its sites were. However, many of the permanent structures still exist and can be visited, and since 2014, publications with in-depth and comprehensive studies have begun to become available. This new sensitivity to the Fortress can also be seen in recent restoration efforts that are trying to bring new light to the places of the Fortress and their significance after years of neglect. For example, the Civezzano road cut is owned by the municipality and was restored in 2013 (the lower structure was demolished in the 1920s for road rectification work), as was the Bus de Vela barrage (restored between 2006 and 2008 and now used as a museum), Fort Tenna (2012) and Fort Col de le Bene (2014). Others, such as the Mattarello works, lie in a state of semi-abandonment awaiting restoration but are public and accessible. Still others, such as Fort Romagnano, Blockhaus Doss di Sponde, and Martignano Battery, have been used for housing or integrated into private parks. A special note should be reserved for Fort San Rocco, which, after its disposal from the military property in the 1980s, was given as a sinecure to one of the heirs of a worker who participated in its construction. This private individual has been in charge of its maintenance for several years while waiting for an intervention by the municipality and the province of Trento to integrate it within the Doss San Rocco park. All the myriad of field posts, trenches as well as permanent outdoor structures, on the other hand, still stud the area although some are slowly falling victim to urban development. However, in recent years volunteer organizations with the support of local authorities have taken steps to preserve and make accessible many of these works such as the entrenched camp on Mount Soprassasso and the works on Mount Celva.

=== Current status of permanent structures ===
==== Restored and visitable structures ====
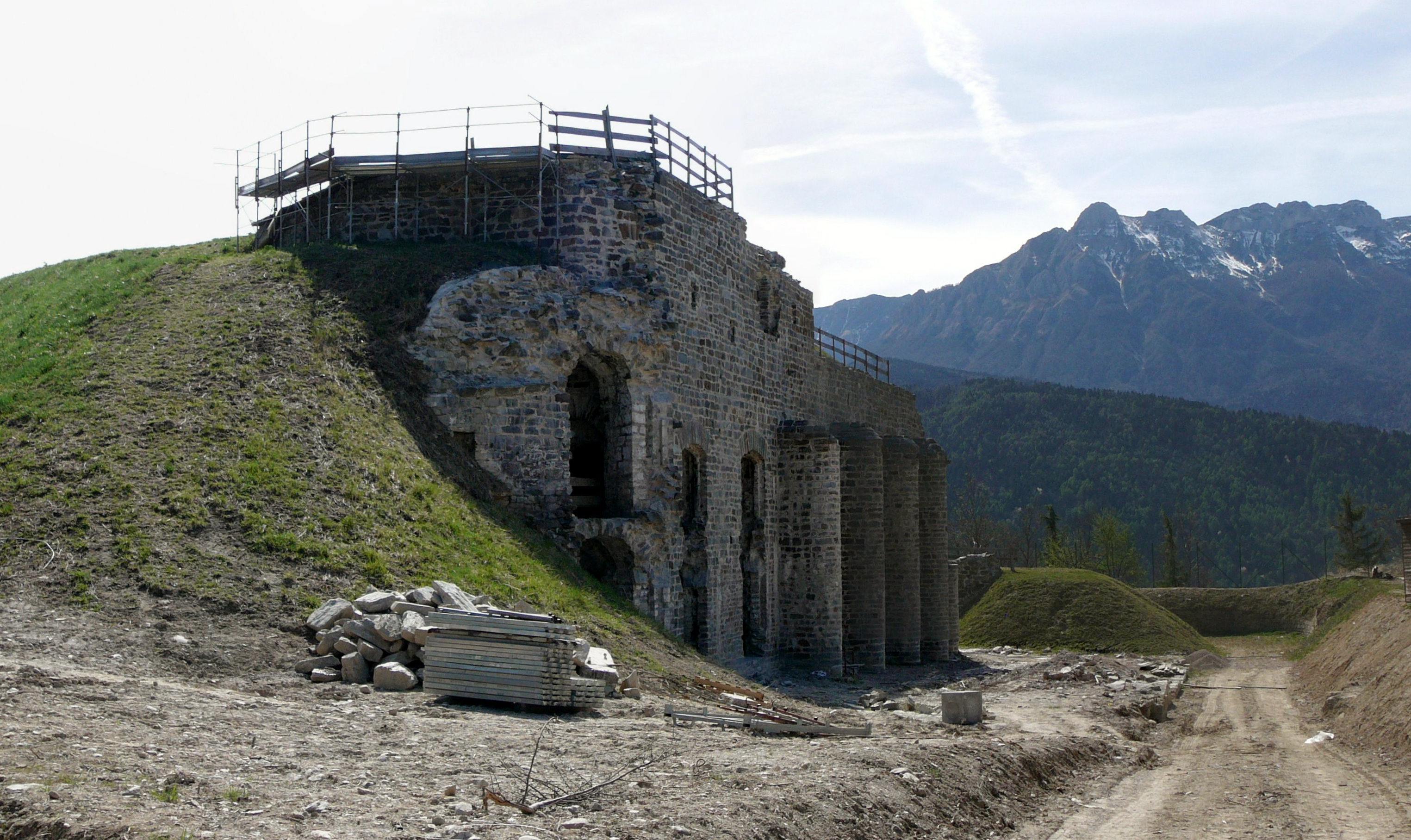
Fort Tenna during restoration work.

- Bus de Vela Barrage
- Civezzano upper road cut
- Roncogno Battery
- Fort Busa Grande
- Fort Col de le Bene
- Fort Tenna

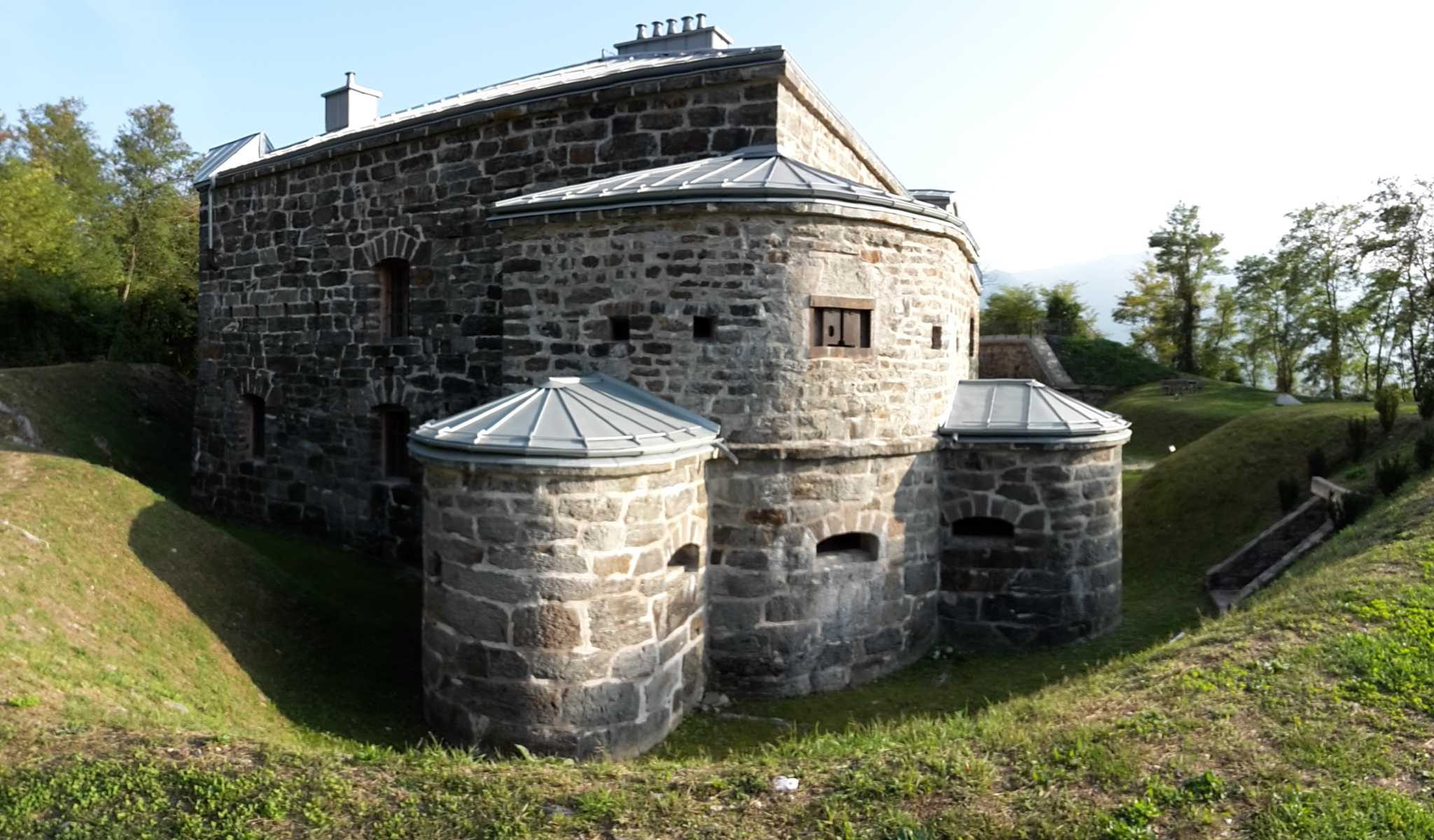
Fort Col de le Bene after restoration.

==== Structures in a state of semi-abandonment and/or ruins but visitable ====
- Middle Battery of Mattarello
- Fort Mattarello
- Marzola Battery
- Blockhaus Maranza

==== Privately owned structures that cannot be visited ====
- Fort Romagnano
- Blockhaus Doss di Sponde
- Martignano Battery
- Brusafer Battery
- Doss Fornas Battery
- Fort San Rocco

==== Demolished structures and/or ruins that cannot be visited ====
- Fort of Civezzano
- Lower road cut of Civezzano
- Rocchetta Barrage
- Lower Battery of Mattarello
- Blockhaus Mandolin
- Candirai Battery
- Fort Casara

== See also ==
- Trento
- History of Trentino
- Austria-Hungary

== Bibliography ==
=== Books ===
- Tabarelli, Gian Maria (1988). I forti austriaci nel Trentino. Trento: TEMI.
- Marzi, Corrado; Borsato, Tiziano (2000). Trento città fortezza. Cremona: Persico.
- Grestenberger, Erwin Anton (2000). K.u.k. Befestigungsanlagen in Tirol und Kärnten 1860–1918 (in German). Wien: Verlag Österreich u. a.
- Malatesta, Leonardo (2003). La guerra dei forti. Chiari (BS): Nordpress.
- Menestrina, Anna (2004). Diario da una città fortezza: Trento 1915-1918. Trento: Fondazione Museo Storico del Trentino.
- Jeschkeit, Volker (2008). La Fortezza di Trento. Trento: Curcu & Genovese.
- Jeschkeit, Volker (2009). Il Calisio e la Grande Guerra. Trento: Curcu & Genovese.
- Jeschkeit, Volker (2010). Le linee avanzate della Fortezza di Trento. Trento: Curcu & Genovese.
- Jeschkeit, Volker (2011). Il fronte orientale della Fortezza di Trento. Trento: Curcu & Genovese.
- Jeschkeit, Volker (2012). Il fronte occidentale della Fortezza di Trento. Trento: Curcu & Genovese.
- Jeschkeit, Volker (2019). La storia del Forte Busa Grande 1906–2018. Vignola Falesina: Comune di Vignola Falesina.
- Morena Dallemule, ed. (2014). Il recupero dei forti austroungarici trentini. Trento: Provincia Autonoma di Trento.
- Jeschkeit, Volker (2014). Il fronte meridionale della Fortezza di Trento. Trento: Curcu & Genovese.
- Jeschkeit, Volker (2016). Trento 1915-1918: la città militarizzata. Trento: Curcu & Genovese.
- Elena Tonezzer, ed. (2016). Città Fortezza. Trento: Fondazione Museo Storico del Trentino.
- Luca Caracisti, ed. (2016). Sui sentieri della Fortezza di Trento. Trento: Fondazione museo storico del Trentino.
- Nicola Fontana, ed. (2017). Memorie in divisa. Ufficiali austroungarici in Trentino al tempo di Francesco Giuseppe. Trento: Società di studi trentini di scienze storiche.
- Fontana, Nicola (2016). La regione fortezza. Rovereto: Museo storico italiano della guerra.
- Lorenzo Gardumi, ed. (2017). L'ultimo anno: 1917-1918. Trento: Fondazione Museo Storico del Trentino.
- Diego Leoni, ed. (2018). Cosa videro quegli occhi! Uomini e donne in guerra: 1913-1920. Rovereto: Laboratorio di storia di Rovereto.

=== Publications ===
- Nicola Fontana (2001). "Daniel von Salis-Soglio I.R. direttore delle opere di fortificazione a Trento (1867–1871)". Annali del Museo Storico della Guerra (7). Rovereto: 145–150.
- Luca Filosi (2018). "Trento durante la Prima Guerra Mondiale: città ospedale e problematiche igienico-sanitarie". Annali del Museo Storico della Guerra (26). Rovereto: 7–36.

=== Archival collections ===
- Archivio di Stato di Trento
- Archivio Storico del Comune di Trento
- Archivio Storico del Museo della Guerra
- Österreichisches Staatsarchiv Wien
- Tiroler Landesarchiv Innsbruck

=== Exhibitions ===
- Trento Città Fortezza – Le Gallerie di Piedicastello (Trento)
- L'ultimo Anno: 1917 – 1918 – Le Gallerie di Piedicastello (Trento)
- I trentini nella guerra europea – Le Gallerie di Piedicastello (Trento)
- Cosa videro quegli occhi! Uomini e donne in guerra: 1913 – 1920 – Museo civico di Rovereto (Rovereto)
