= Candriai Battery =

Austro-Hungarian artillery battery in the Trentino, Italy

The Candriai Battery is an Austro-Hungarian fortification built on the mountain of Monte Bondone South-West of Trento. The battery was built between 1879-80, it was built near the Mandolin Blockhouse, and had the same purpose to support the existing fortifications, control the route to and from Sopramonte. Candriai also had optical connections to the Mandolin Blockhouse. Fort Candriai was also built to prevent the circumvention of the Buco di Vela roadblock and Doss di Sponde blockhouse to the south. Candriai is built out of local stone, which made it vulnerable to later artillery. Fort Candriai’s guns were emplaced in open casemate batteries. Candriai’s crew was 2 Officers and 129 men as of 1914.

== Armament ==
- 8 9 cm M75/96 Quick-firing cannons
- 11 rifle slits
- 3 30 cm spotlights
- 2 25 cm spotlights

== World War I ==
Since Fort Candriai was built out of stone, it was obsolete by 1915. Thus the decision was made to disarm Candriai and move the guns to field positions nearby.

== Post-war ==
While the land is public, the fort is not available to visit. The battery was disarmed in 1915 and progressively demolished after the war, only traces of the battery remain.
