= Martignano battery =

Austro-Hungarian artillery battery in the Trentino

Coordinates: 46°05′05″N 11°07′50″E

The Martignano battery is located at an elevation of 405m near the village of the same 3km from the Northern Italian city of Trento. Martignano is an Austro-Hungarian fortification built in the 1860s. Like most Austro-Hungarian fortifications of the time, Martignano was built out of local quarried stone. The battery’s excellent position allowed it to support the other early works at Rocchetta to the north, Doss di Sponde and Buco di Vela roadblock to the west, and Civezzano to the east. From the high ground it was located on it could control the Adige Valley on a North-South axis. The fort was originally armed with 4 12cm M61 fortress guns mounted in armored casemates, and 2 9cm M75 guns mounted in minimum gunports. Martignano’s crew was 1 officer and 88 enlisted men. Due to the irregular form of the fort the guns could fire in all 4 cardinal directions. The fort was renovated in subsequent years after its construction, this is where the fort gained its caponier, a small blockhouse with rifle ports facing into the moat.

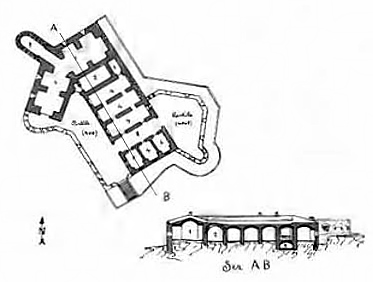
The floor plan of The Martignano battery.

== World War I ==
Like all of the early fortifications built around Trento, the battery was considered obsolete. Despite the guns being old, they were emplaced in field positions nearby. From 1915 to 1918, Martignano was used as a warehouse.

== Post-war ==
The fort was discharged from service on Sept. 28th, 1947. On Nov. 20, 1956, the battery was bought by Società Italiana Explosivi Cheddite (Italian Society of Cheddite Explosives) and used as a powder magazine. Today the battery is privately owned and is not available to visit.
