= Colle delle benne =

Fort in Trento, Italy

Coordinates: 46.021°N 11.281°E

Fort Col De Le Benne, also known as Fort San Baigio, is a fortification built to guard Trento from an attack coming from the municipality of Pergine. Given the fort's location it could dominate the north side of Lake Levico, and part of the Valsuganasperre (Valsugana Blockage). Col De Le Benne and Fort Tenna were an outer ring of the Fortress of Trento. The fort is surrounded by ditches and embankments stretching around in a polygonal shape. Like many forts of the time it was made to withstand sieges, equipped to do this with a generator, a telephone switchboard, a device for optical communications, rainwater collection tanks, and most importantly of all, watertight compartments for storing ammunition. The fort was armed with two 10 cm M05 cannons, four 12 cm M80 fortress guns, and a fixed dome used for observation. In 1902, the two 10 cm howitzers were mounted in rotating armored domes and a rotating observation dome. Despite being renovated so recently, Col De Le Benne played a relatively minor role in World War I.

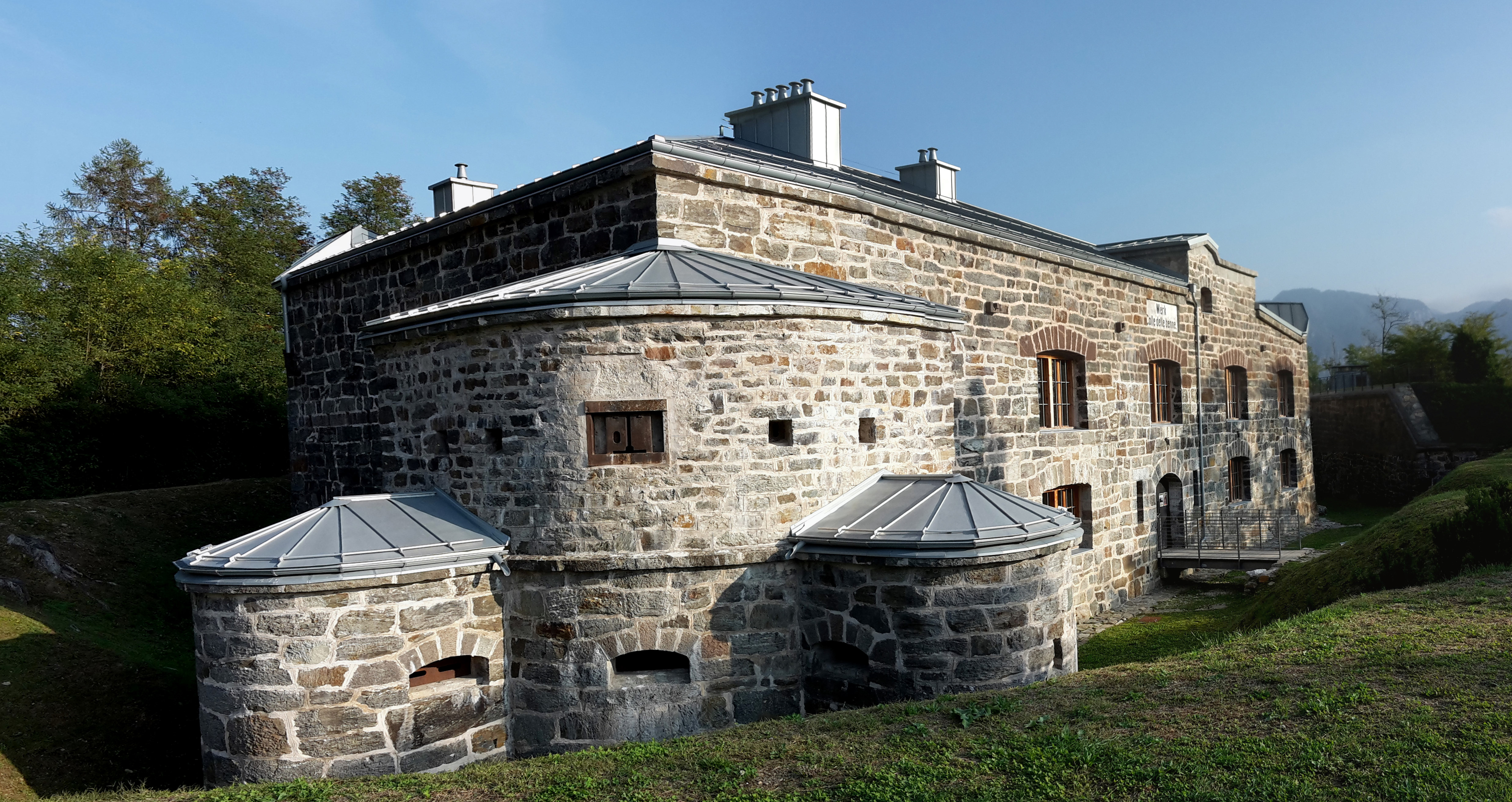
The 2 gorge caponiers, since the machine gun wasn't widely used at the time, the slits would have been for riflemen to fire out of while keeping themselves safe.

== World War I ==
The decision was made to partially disarm the fort in the summer of 1915. Two of the 12 cm guns were placed on Monte Celva, along with the observation dome. The two 10 cm guns and the other two 12 cm guns were relocated the new Fort Busa Grande.

== Post-war ==
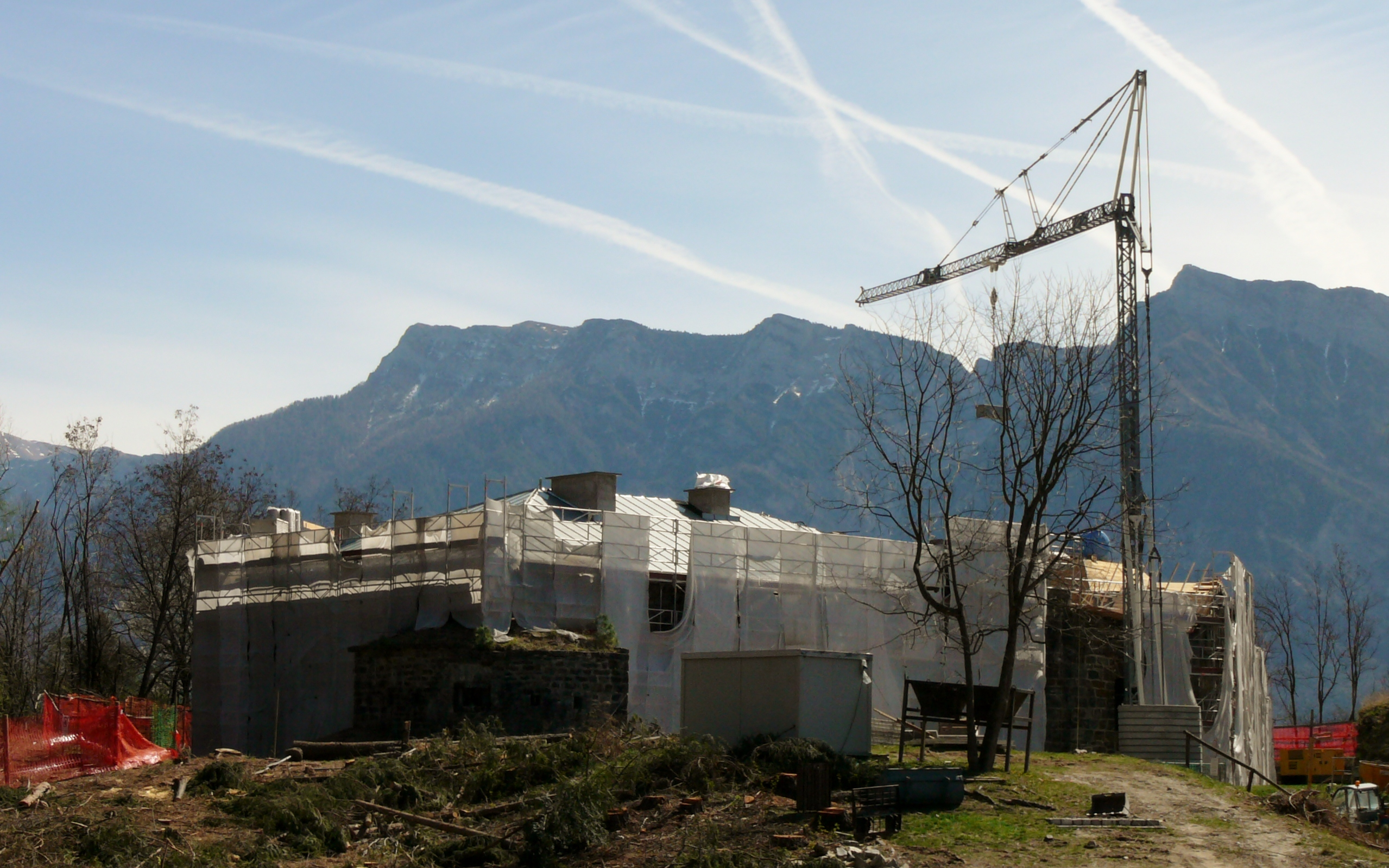
Col De Le Benne during renovations in 2013.

The fort was sold after the war for 3,000 lire to the municipality of Levico Terme on October 13, 1933, after which the fort fell into a state of ruin. Work began in 2010 to restore the fort, and the work was completed in 2014.
