= Mandolin Blockhouse =

The Mandolin Blockhouse is an early 20th century Austro-Hungarian fortification built to guard the city of Trento from the North. The blockhouse was built at an altitude of 1100m on Monte Bondone, just to the South-West of Trento. The Mandolin Blockhouse was built in 1908, and not much is written of the blockhouse. What is written is that it was constructed to support the Candriai battery just down the mountain.

Mandolin’s armament was 47 cm “Mountain” cannons facing towards Sopramonte. Mandolin was connected to the other fortifications on Monte Bondone by a military road. Mandolin had 4 barracks and a villa for the officers, and was designed to have defensible barracks. Despite being built in 1908, Mandolin was built out of large stone blocks and was vulnerable to modern artillery. The Mandolin Blockhouse was also connected to the Mattarello Fortified Complex by a cable car.

== Post-World War I ==
The Mandolin Blockhouse was demolished after World War I. A heliotherapy clinic has been erected on the site of the blockhouse.
