= Rocchetta roadblock =

Austro-Hungarian fortification in the Trentino, Italy

The Rocchetta Barrage is a mid 19th century fort built to protect what was at the time the Austro-Hungarian city of Trento. The fort was built between 1860-64, as part of the first generation of Austro-Hungarian fortifications built to protect Trento from the Italian state of Lombardy. The fort features a road cut to protect Trento from an attack through the Tonale Pass. The fort was built mainly facing the Non Valley, barring the way to Trento. The fort had 11 16cm M61 casemate cannons, with 8 oriented towards the Non Valley, and 3 oriented towards the plain of Mezzolombardo. Rocchetta was crewed by 25 men from the fortress of Trento.

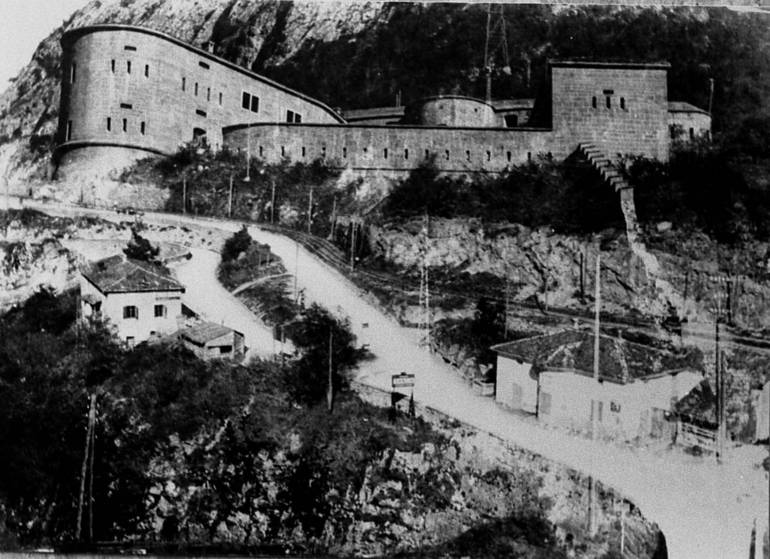
An image from before World War I, the guard house off to the left was recently added when the photo was taken.

== World War I ==
A diagram of Rocchetta and the road it was meant to guard.

The fort was well kept before the war, but by late 1915 the Austro-Hungarian high command realized that an Italian breakthrough was less and less likely and the fort was downgraded, its main armament moved to more active fronts and the fort became a supply depot.

== Post-war ==
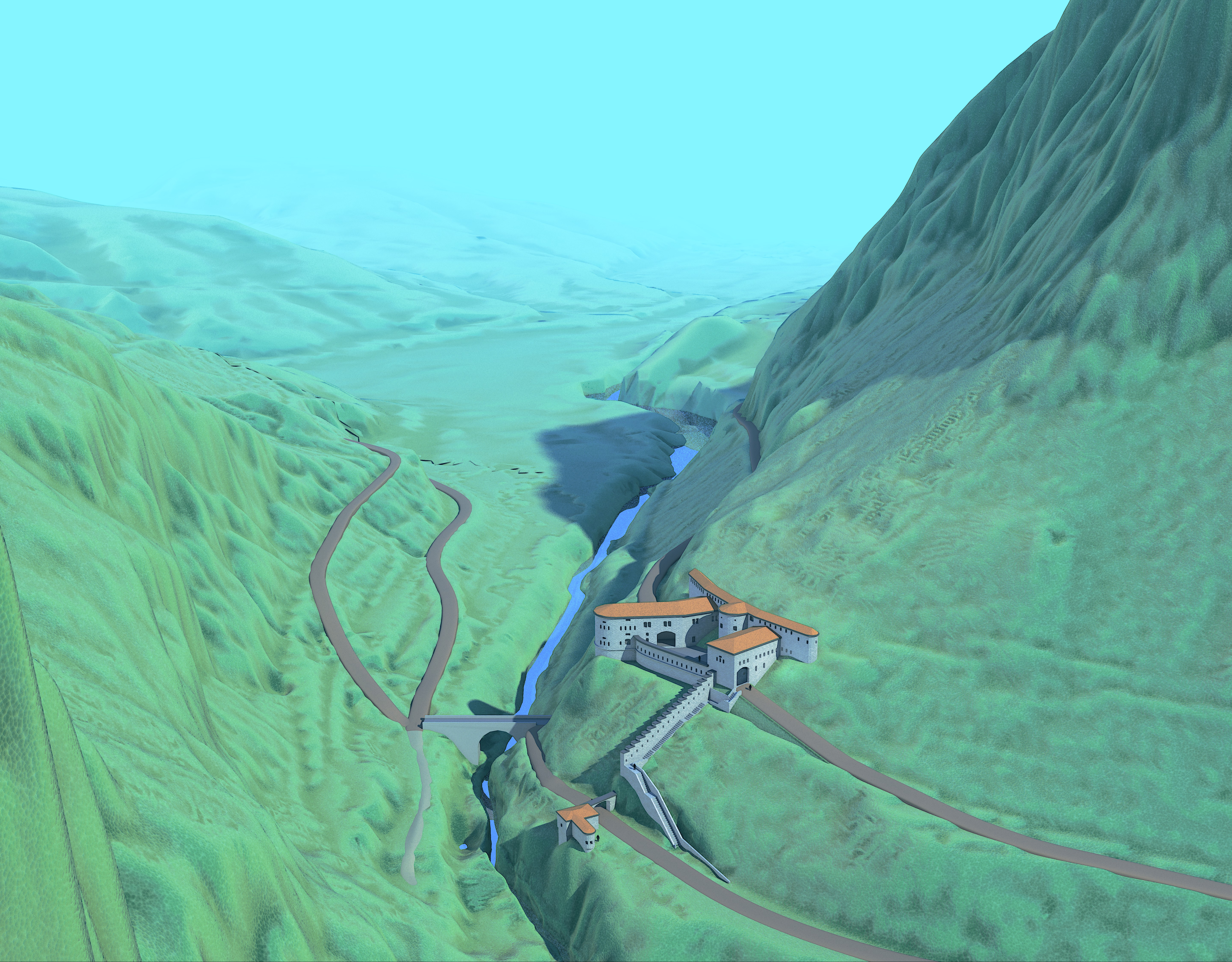
A computer reconstruction of what Rocchetta would look like if it was in perfect condition.

After the war the Italian government used the fort as a powder magazine and storage for half a million Austro-Hungarian grenades with the intent of disarming the grenades. On Dec. 27, 1922, probably due to the mis-handling of explosives, the fort was rocked by a tremendous explosion that killed 6 workers and 1 soldier of 18th Infantry Regiment “Brigade Aqui”, and blew away the lower part of the fort and the passing road. On Sept. 22, 1927, Rocchetta was discharged from military service. 2 years later Rocchetta was demolished to widen the road passing below. Today, the remains of the fort are located in the La Rocchetta Biotope.
