= Romagnano works =

Austro-Hungarian fortification near Trento, Trentino, Italy

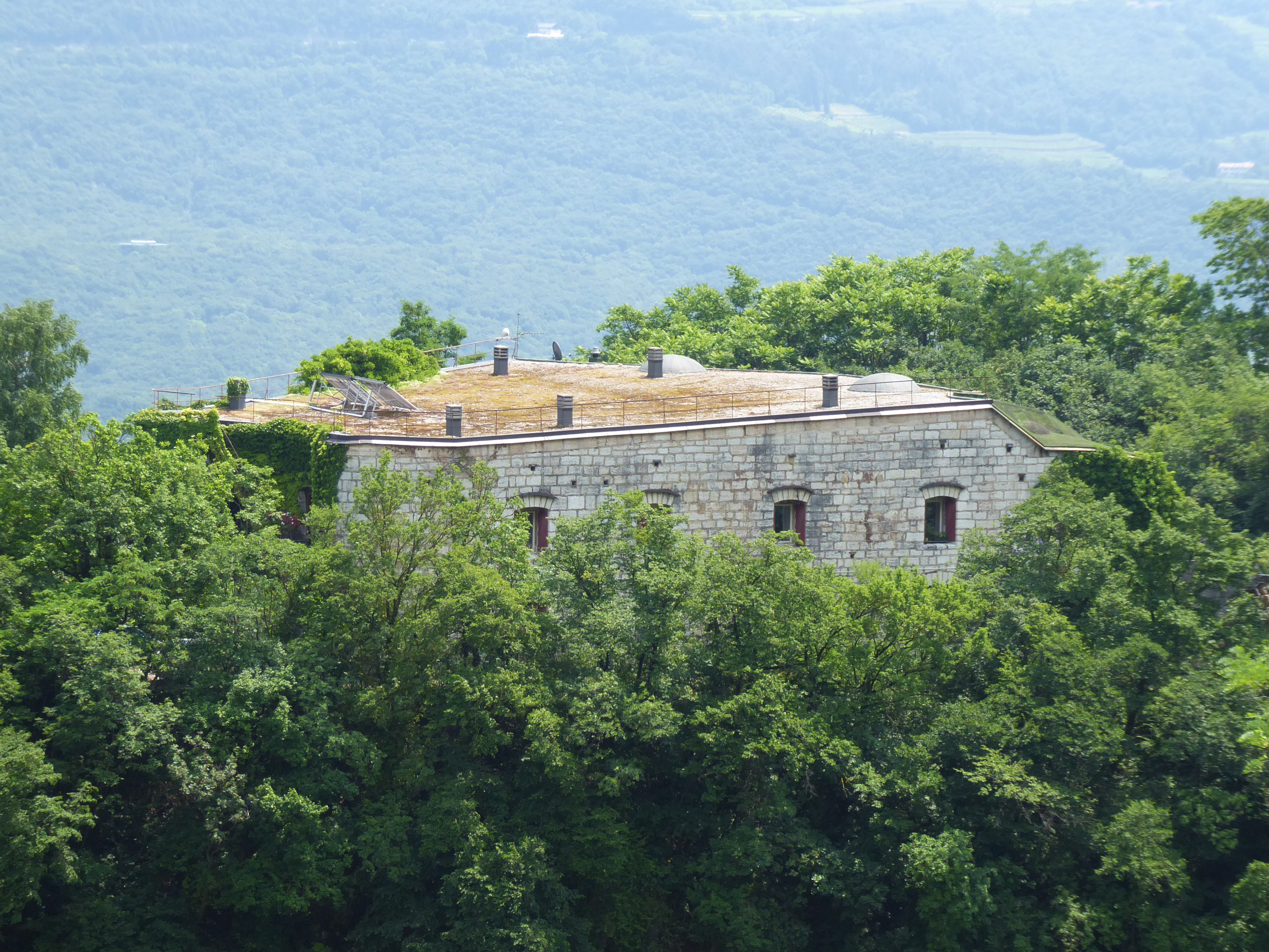
Fake iron domes now sit where the original 15cm guns were before being removed in the summer of 1915.

Fort Romagnano is an Austro-Hungarian fort built in the ring of fortifications surrounding the Northern Italian city of Trento. The fort was built between 1892-95, it was built, like the Mattarello Fortified Complex, to guard the Trento from an attack up the Adige Valley to the South. The fort was built using limestone and concrete vestment. The fort also had the function of barring the way to Trento from the small hamlet of Aldeno. This is why the artillery casemates supported those of the Mattarello Fortified Complex which had the same job. Due to the lack of funds, the fort was built as small as possible, while fitting the most in. This is why the fort had two levels, so that the most armaments and supplies could be fit in.

The fort was built in a triangular shape, with the base facing south. This made it visible from afar, and since the fort was compact, a few well-placed heavy shots could put it out of action. The fort's military value lay in its four 12cm and two 15cm cannons placed in armored domes. The fort had a ditch protecting its north and south faces. In 1915, four 12cm guns were added along with a few QF guns of an unspecified caliber.

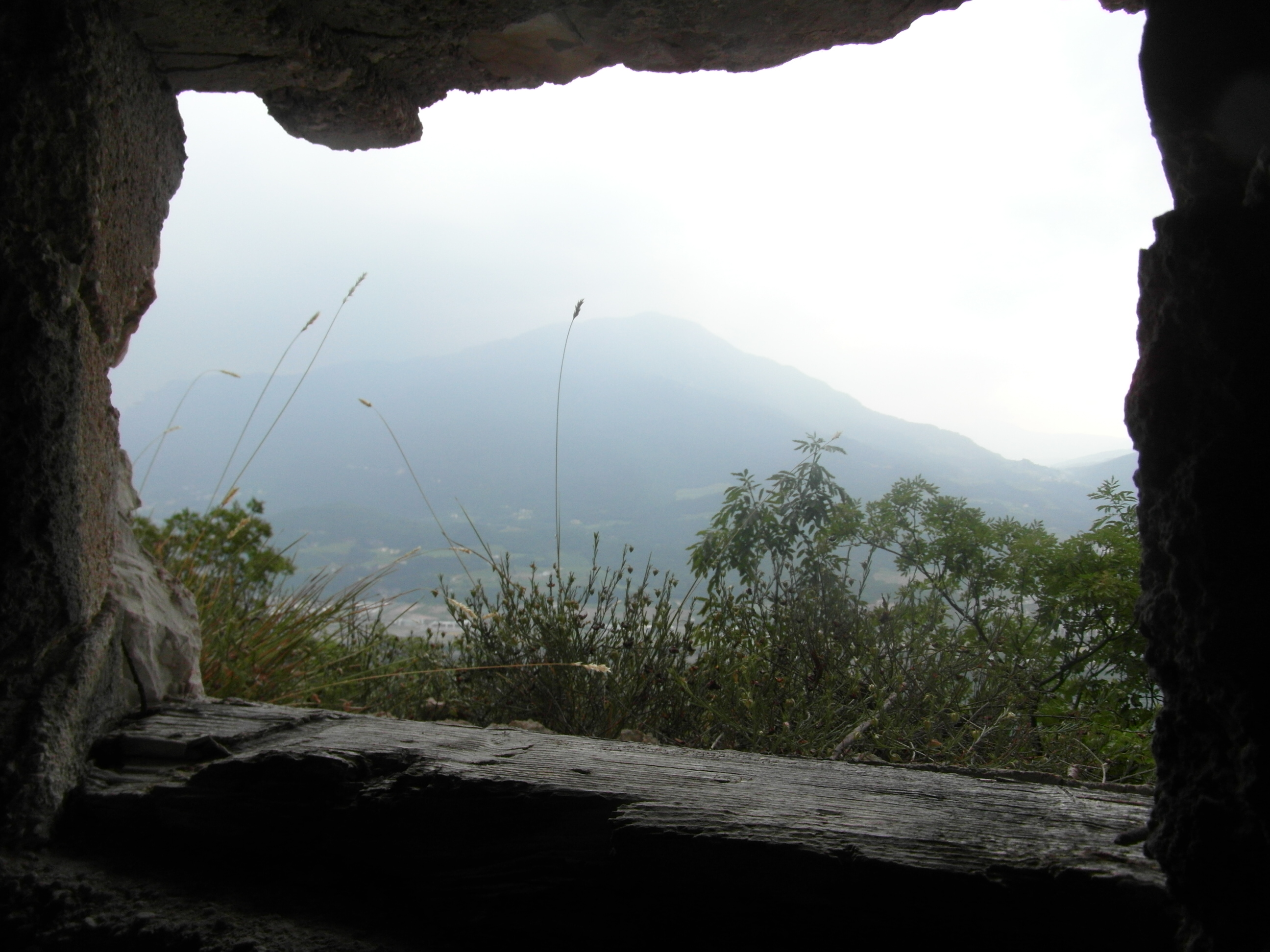
The view from one of the gun ports in the cave battery.

== World War I ==
When the Trento defenses were re-organized in the summer of 1915, the two 15cm M80 guns and their armored domes were moved to a cave on Monte Calisio. Two of the 12cm M96 K guns were moved to cemented field positions just below Monte Bondone, behind the park of Villa Margon, to the northeast of their original positions. There was also Battery in the cave of Romagnano I, this was the lower battery, consisting of two 8cm M75 field guns for close defense. Behind Villa Margon there was Battery in the cave of Romagnano II, this was the upper level of the replacement batteries, it housed two 9cm M75 field cannons for close defense. Both were meant to bombard advancing infantry and to protect the larger forts. In addition the twp remaining 12cm M96 K guns were moved to exterior positions outside Battery Marzola (also called Maranza)

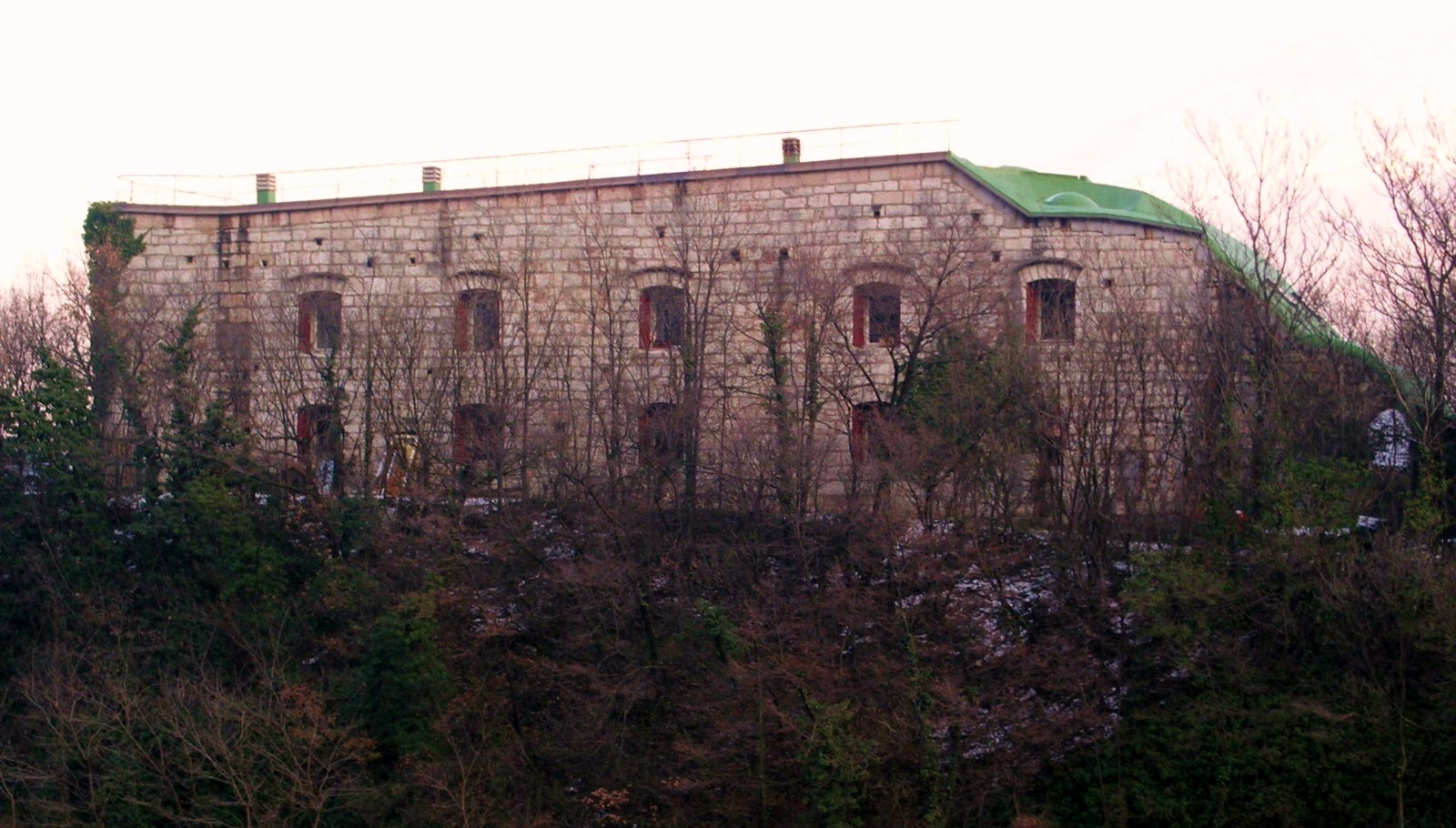
Romagnano today is used as a private residence.

== Post-war ==
Romagnano was discharged from military service on April 3, 1968. Today the fort is a private residence.
