= Doss di Sponde blockhouse =

Austro-Hungarian fortification in Italy

Coordinates: 46°04′50.28″N 11°04′20.4″E

The Doss di Sponde blockhouse is a 19th century Austro-Hungarian fortification built to protect the city of Trento from an attack down the Vela Valley. The fort was built between 1860-62 just slightly upstream from Fort Cadine, also known as Bus De Vela. The fort has 2 floors facing the town of Cadine to the west and 1 floor facing east towards Trento. The fort has 1.9m thick walls and a 3m wide moat. Doss Sponde measures 35 X 10.5m.

The blockhouses' main armament was 2 12cm M61 casemate cannons with depression relays, which means it could fire downhill. In addition it had 2 8cm M75 field cannons. In 1900, Doss di Sponde was updated, and during this a rotating observation dome was added. Sponde's crew was 1 officer and 56 enlisted men.

== Post-World War I ==
Sponde was discharged from the Royal Army on Mar 19, 1949, and was abandoned until it was bought on Feb. 13, 1955. Today it is owned by a private individual.
