= Fort Buco di Vela =

Austro-Hungarian roadblock near Trento, Italy

Coordinates: 46°05′00″N 11°04′21″E

Fort Buco di Vela (Italian: Forte Buco di Vela, German: Strassensperre Buco di Vela Ladin: Forte Bus De Vela), also known as Fort Cadine, is a mid 19th century roadblock built to guard the city of Trento in Northern Italy. The fort is situated 4km (2.5mi) west of Trento, in a gorge called the Bus de Vela, which is where the fort gets its name. The roadblock was built between 1860 and 1862, with the intention of blocking the road between Trento and Cadine. The fort was impossible to bypass and the only way through is by destroying the fort itself. The fort was part of the first fortifications built to protect Trento. The roadblock was also built to protect the newly-built road from Lake Garda. The fort mounted 3 9cm M75/4 cannons all facing towards Cadine, in addition it had 2 8cm barbette cannons and many rifle embrasures covering almost every direction, especially the road. The fort has an armoured door on the west side of the fort, facing towards Cadine.

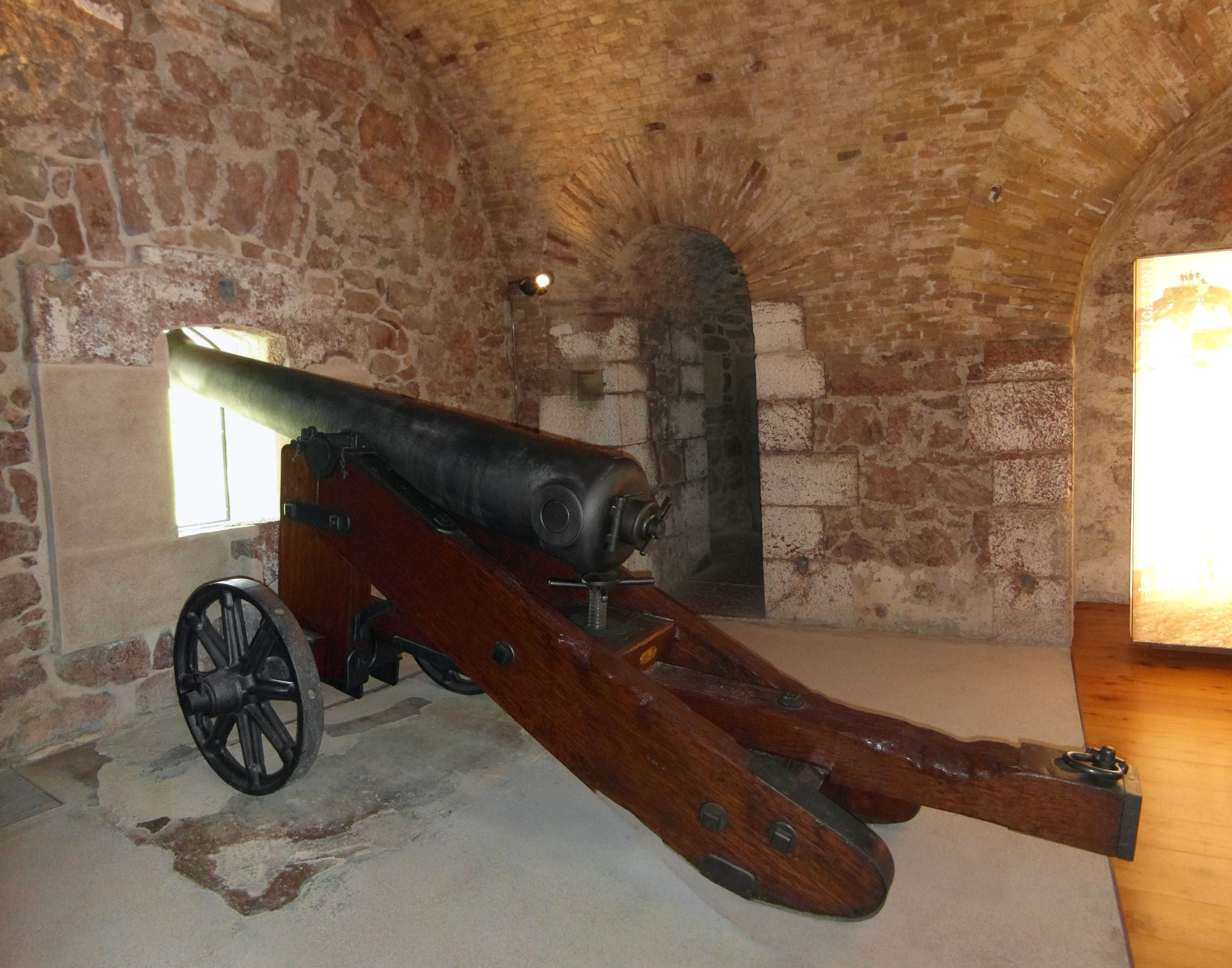
A replica of the original 9cm guns in which Cadine was armed with.

== World War I ==
Most of the forts built around Trento were built by the 19th century standards of war, and were obsolete by World War I. Fort Cadine itself was too exposed and would have been vulnerable to the modern siege artillery of the day. This led to the fort being disarmed and its cannons moved into caves or relocated to frontline fighting. It was likely the cannons from Fort Cadine were moved to frontline positions since they were semi-modern field pieces.

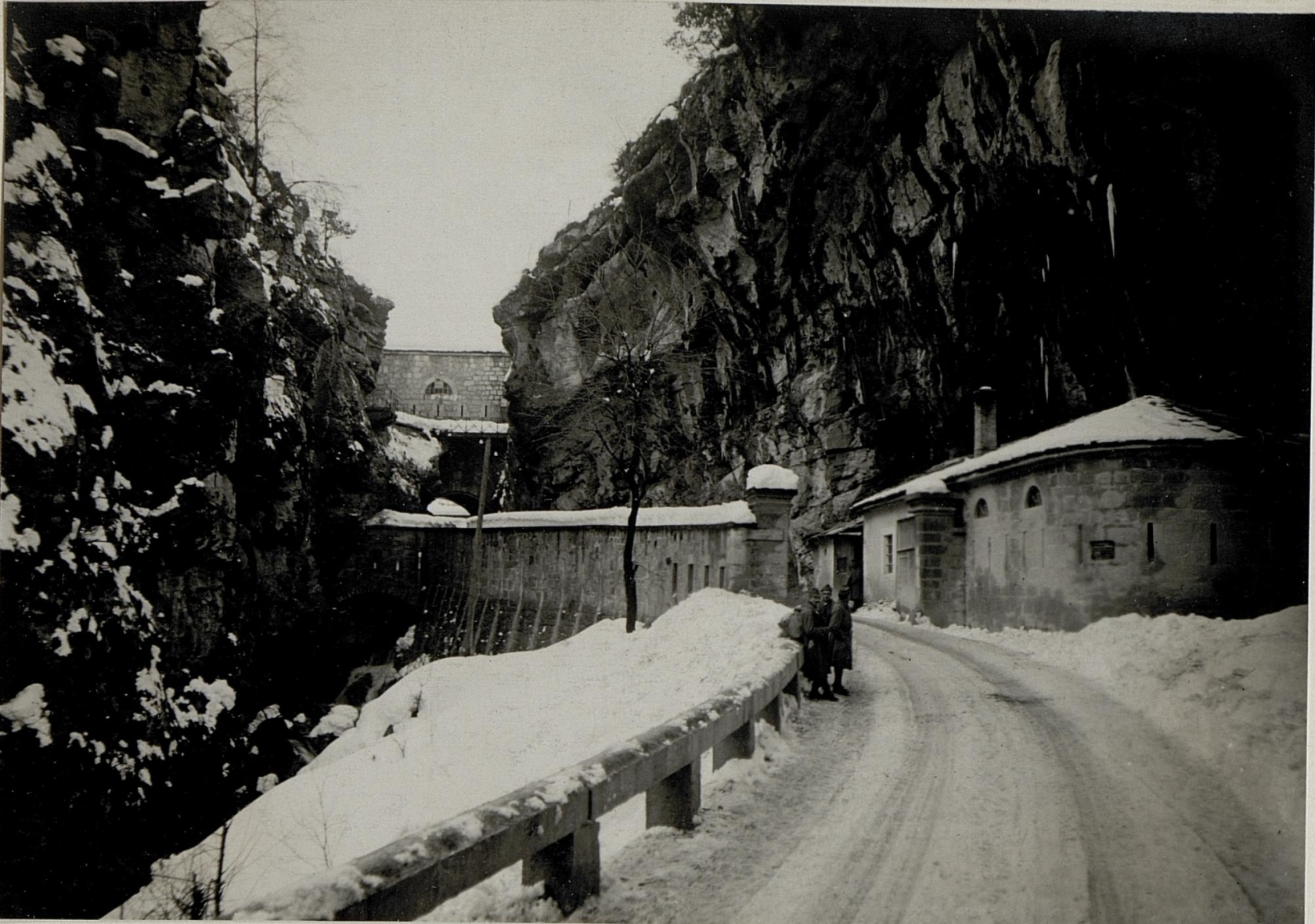
Fort Cadine as of Jan. 17, 1917.

== World War II ==
During the German occupation of Italy following Italy's capitulation in World War II, Nazi forces occupied the fort as a storage facility alongside a checkpoint to guard the vital Brenner Pass. In April 1945, the fort was the site of a failed resistance attack.

== Postwar-today ==
After the war ended the fort was discharged from the military on Mar. 29, 1949. Cadine fell into disrepair during the following years. The fort was restored in 2008, and now is a museum. In the fort’s “poterna” (a concealed part of a fort) the shadows of soldiers are projected onto the walls, in addition to a model dedicated to the World War I forts in the area.

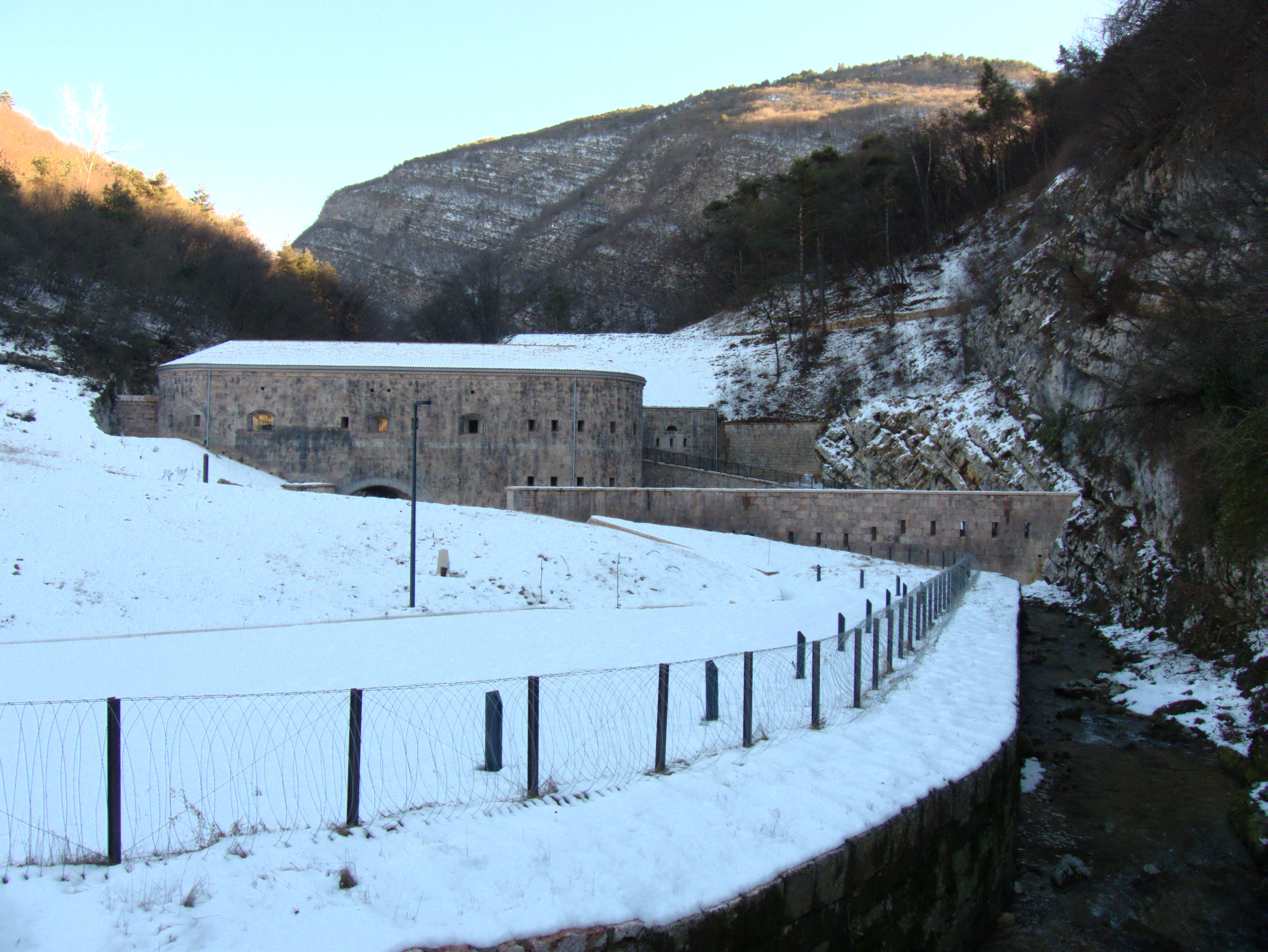
Fort Cadine in 2008, before the renovations.
