= Austro-Hungarian fortifications on the Italian border =

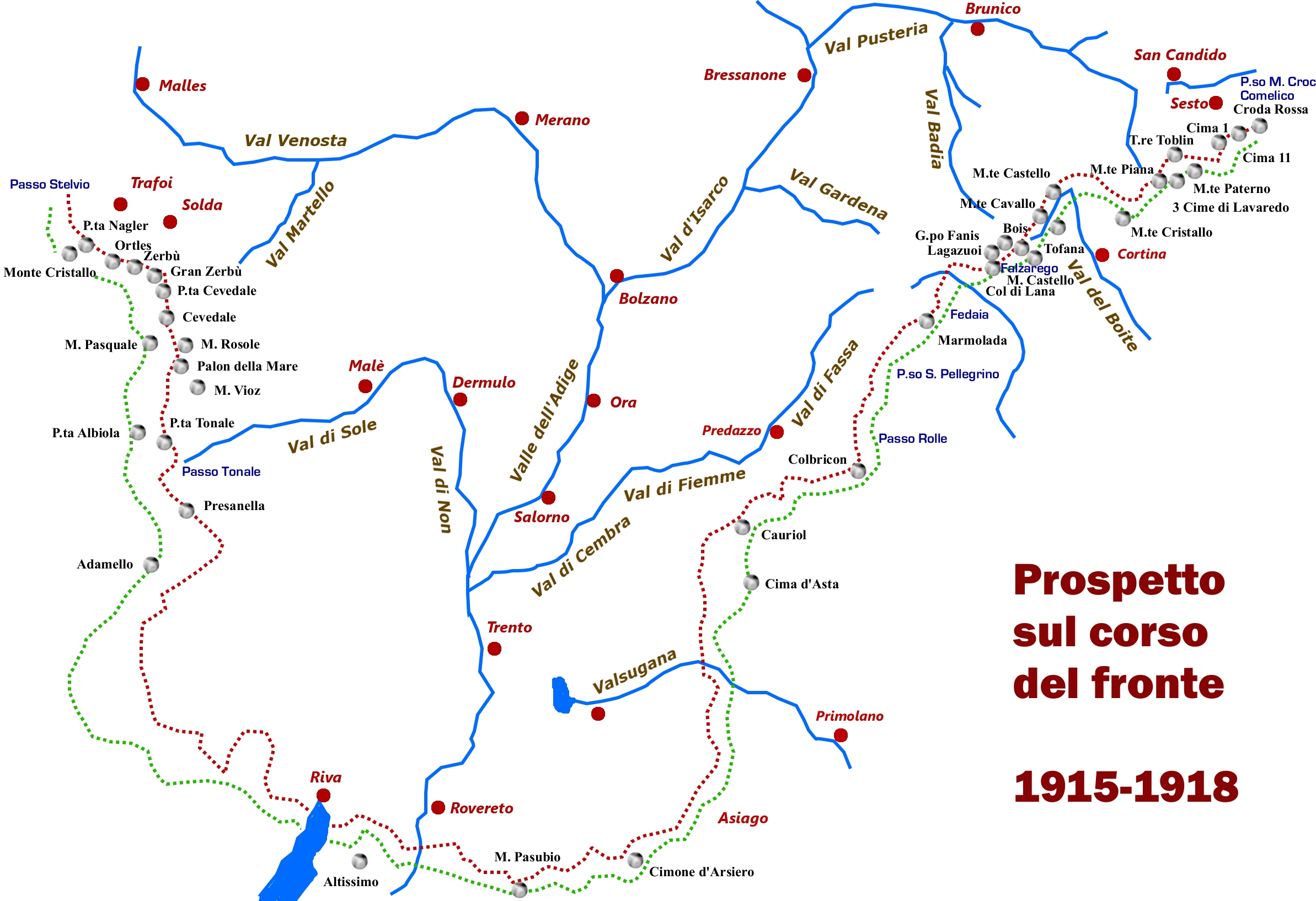
Fortifications along the Italy - Austria-Hungary border in 1915. Fortified towns in red. Red line: Austrian front line, green line: Italian front line

The Austro-Hungarian fortifications on the Italian border were constructed in the 19th and early 20th centuries to protect against invasion from Italy. Most were built in what is today the Trentino-Alto Adige region; some built outside this territory were ceded to Italy after 1866. By the First World War many of them were obsolete, but nevertheless played a role in deterring and containing Italian assaults.

== Terminology ==
Generally, in Austrian military terminology these defensive structures were not referred to as forts. The terms used to describe them were werk ('works'), sperre ('barrier') or straßensperre ('roadblock'). Defence districts were referred to as 'rayons'. Originally there were only two, divided into subrayons or sections. Over the course of the First World War, however, more and more subrayons and sections were replaced by rayons.

== Construction ==
=== Before 1866 ===
Before the Second Italian War of Independence the main Austrian fortifications in Italy were the Quadrilatero in the Po valley. In addition to these strongpoints the Franzensfeste Fortress (1833–1838) was built to guard the southern approaches to the Brenner Pass and the Nauders roadblock (1834–40) to guard the Reschen Pass. The hill Dos Trento was also fortified from 1848 to 1859.

After 1859, the most important passes along the new border with Italy between Lake Garda and Switzerland were fortified, as was Riva del Garda and the road to Trento. These fortifications mostly consisted of large multi-storey structures of natural stone, with cannon mounted behind embrasures. The introduction of rifled firearms soon rendered their design obsolete, but they provided shelter for the guns, which was important in a mountain environment. It was also assumed that the Italians would not try to manoeuvre heavy artillery up into the mountains to threaten these installations. Among the structures dating from this period were Forte Ceraino, Forte Rivoli and Forte Monte, but these were built in territory that passed to Italy in 1866.

=== 1866–1900 ===
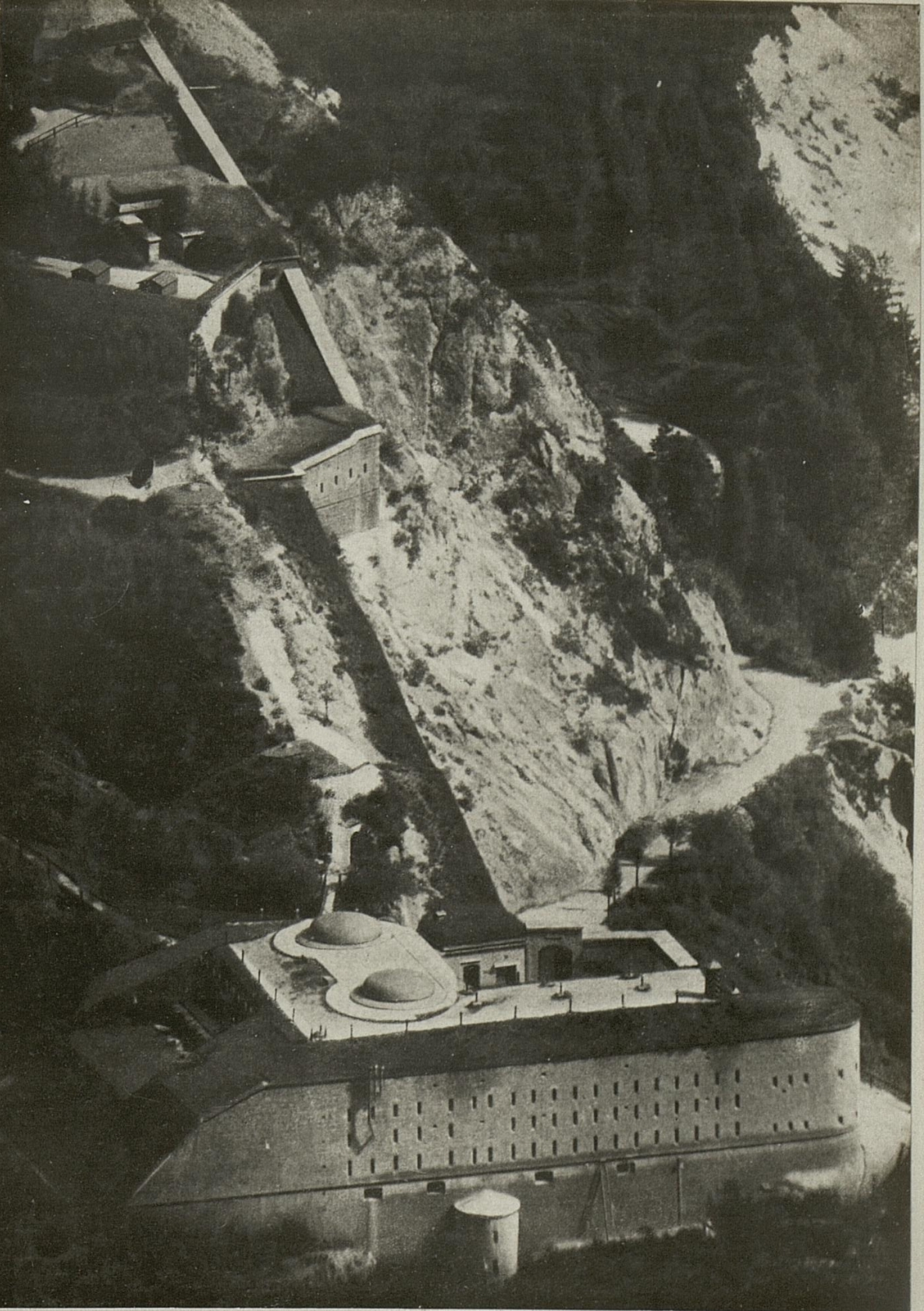
Fort Hensel, 1915

After the Third Italian War of Independence Austria also fortified the new eastern border with the Veneto. From 1870 to 1873 a group of defensive works was erected at Civezzano to block the route to Trento from the Brenta Valley. From 1878 to 1883 the defences of Trento itself were expanded in what became known as the Trientiner style, using a light and economical construction method, with most guns placed in open batteries. A Gruson gun turret was built at the San Rocco works. Defences were also upgraded at Fort Hensel, built between 1881 and 1890, which blocked the Canale Valley near Malborgeth on the southern border of Carinthia and the Kluže Fortress further east in present-day Slovenia.

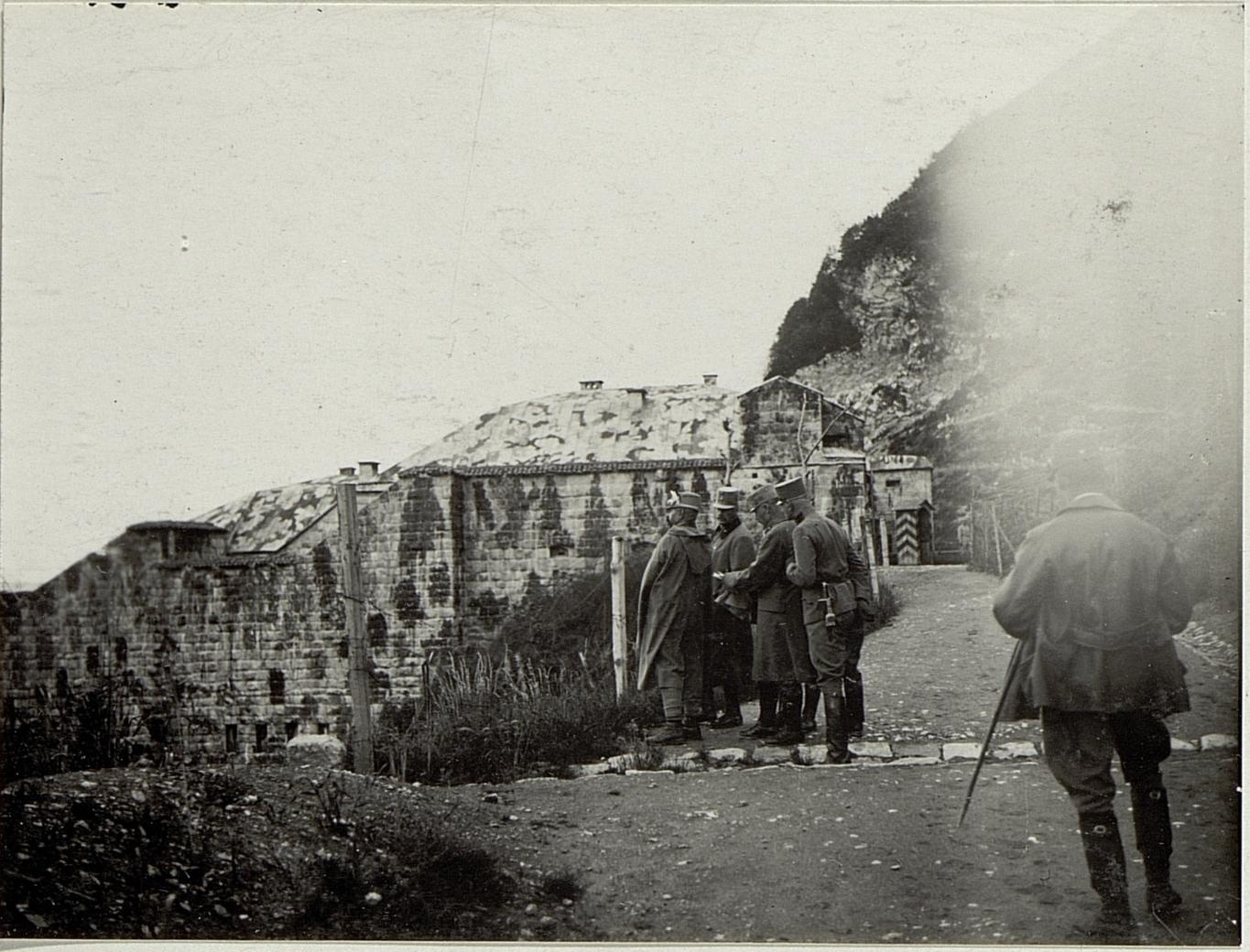
Archduke Leopold Salvator inspecting the Corno works

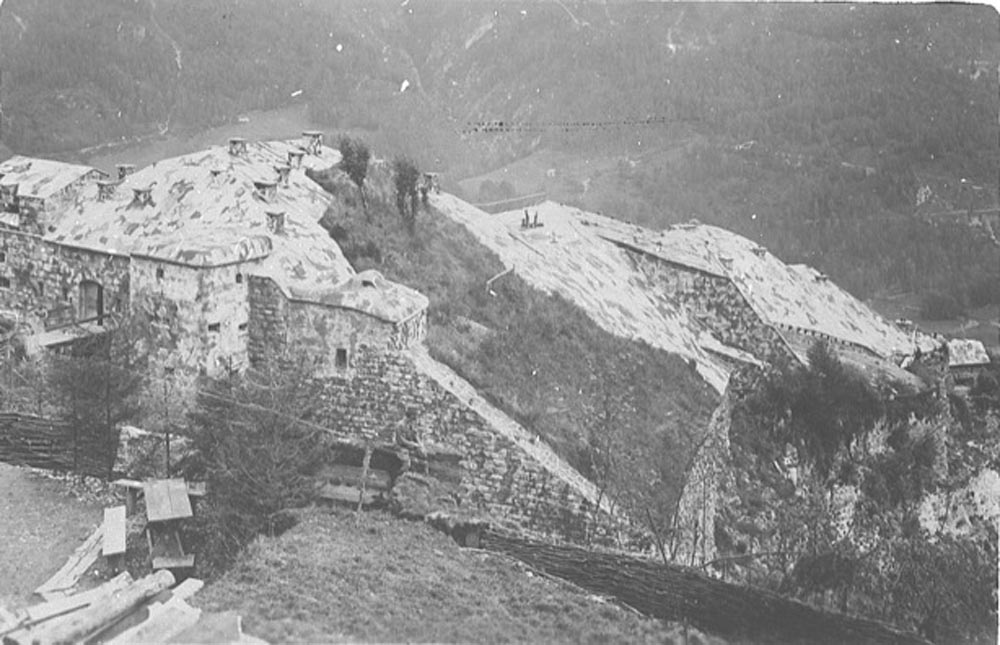
Corno works 1914

From 1884 onwards, many new defences were built according to a relatively uniform scheme overseen by Field Marshal Julius Ritter von Vogl. In particular, the passes in the Dolomites and the Brenta were fortified for the first time, as was the Predil Pass in modern Slovenia. Lardaro was reinforced with the new Corno works; the defences of Trento were expanded with the Romagnano and Mattarello works and the Riva fortress was reinforced with the new batteria di mezzo. The Vogl works were compact integrated structures combining armament and accommodation in a single block. They were mostly built of concrete, with the front clad with granite blocks. The armament consisted of mostly three or four 12-cm cannons behind armoured embrasures, and two to four 15-cm mortars in armored rotating domes on the roof. The works were surrounded by a ditch that could be swept by fire from several caponiers. For close defense, 11 mm mitrailleuses were initially used and machine guns installed from 1893. Because of their embrasures and being built several stories high they had a marked elevation above ground.

=== 1900–1915 ===
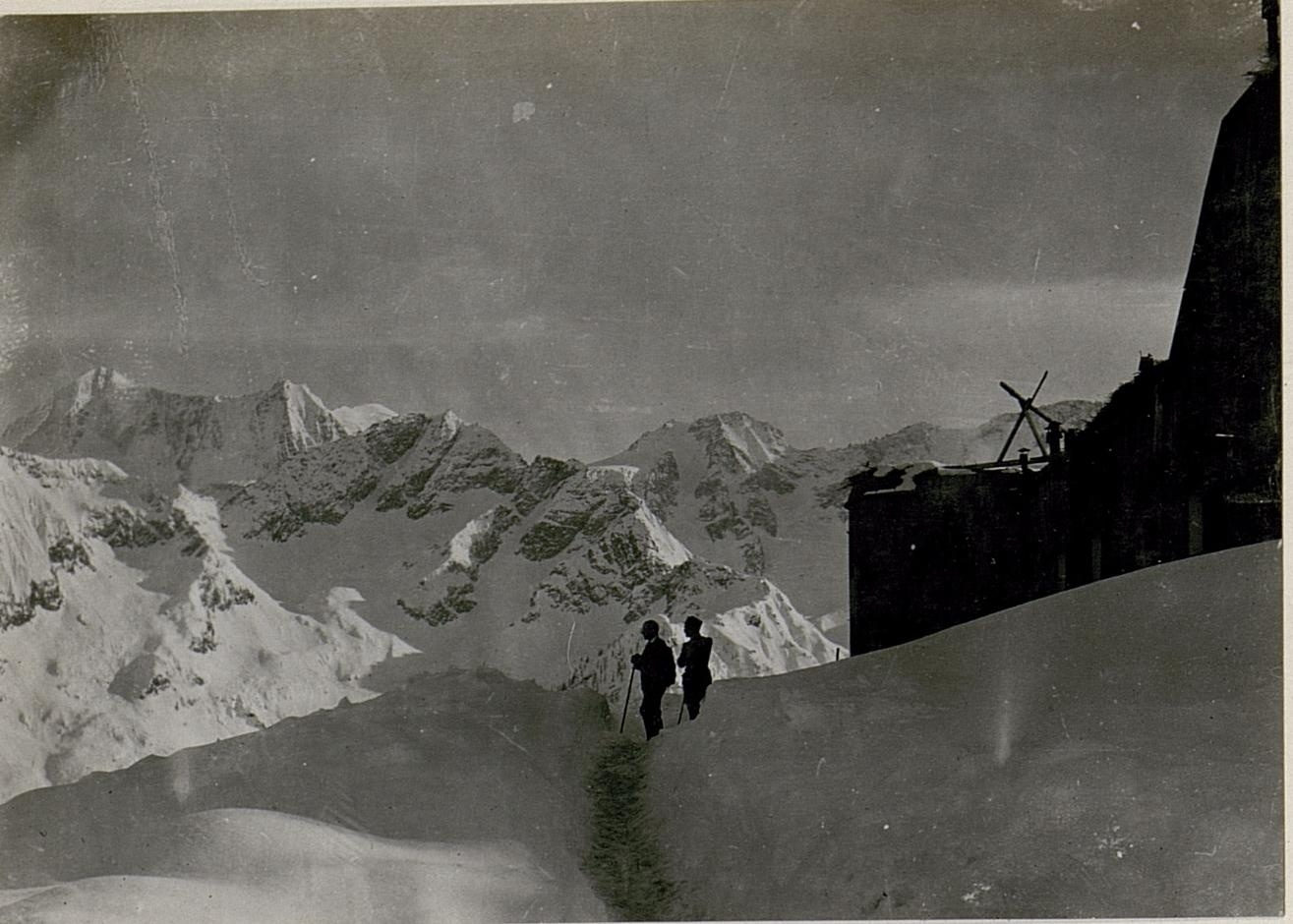
Werk Tonale, Presanella

In the years before the First World War, the Riva fortress was strengthened with the Garda Tombio Works and Landaro with the Carriola. The Tonale Pass, previously fortified with only one old works (Tonale works), was expanded into a cluster of fortifications with five works of different sizes while Folgaria and Lavarone southeast of Trento were also expanded and strengthened.

Developments in the technology of artillery led to new design parameters for fortifications, able to withstand increased calibre and penetration of modem shells. Increasingly, structures were built underground. 10-cm howitzers in rotating armored domes were now standard, together with machine guns for replacing both can in embrasures and machine guns close defense. Typical of this design was the works at Valmorbia, unfinished when Italy declared war in May 1915.

== Rayon of Tyrol ==
The Rayon of Tyrol Came under the Tyrol State Defense Command:

=== Subrayon I ===
Border section 1 - Stilfserjoch Barrier: Ortler with the Gomagoi roadblock (1860–62) protecting the road from the Stelvio Pass to the Vinschgau and the Reschen Pass and Nauders roadblock (1838–1840) blocking the Inn Valley to the north and the road to Landeck and Vorarlberg.

=== Subrayon II ===
Border section 2 - Tonale Barrier: barriers guarding the Tonale Pass. Strino (1860–1862) and Velon (1891), Tonale (1907–10), Presanella (1910–12), Pejo (1908–1910) and Mero (1905–1910/12). The role of these works was to block the Tonale pass road and to protect the Sulztal (Val di Sole) and the Adige valley, preventing Trento from being cut off from the north.

=== Subrayon III ===
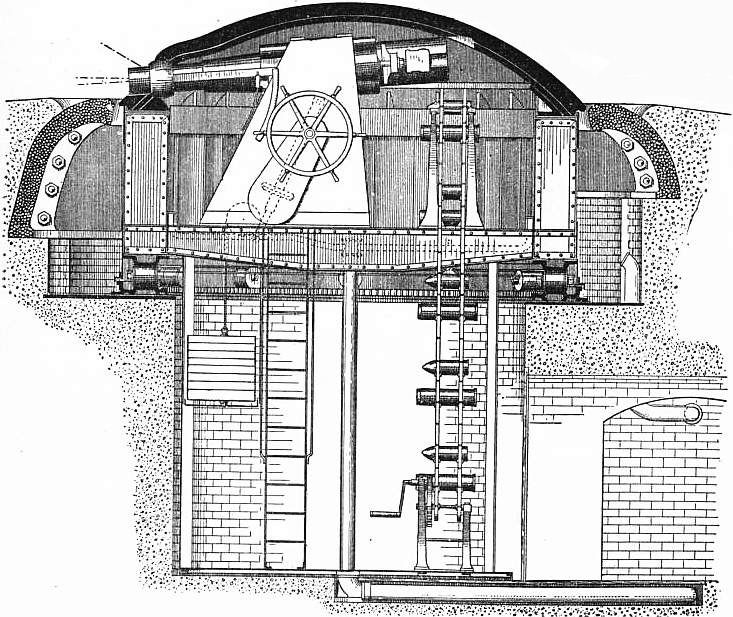
Generic diagram of an armoured cannon turret similar to those Austria-Hungary used in its fortifications

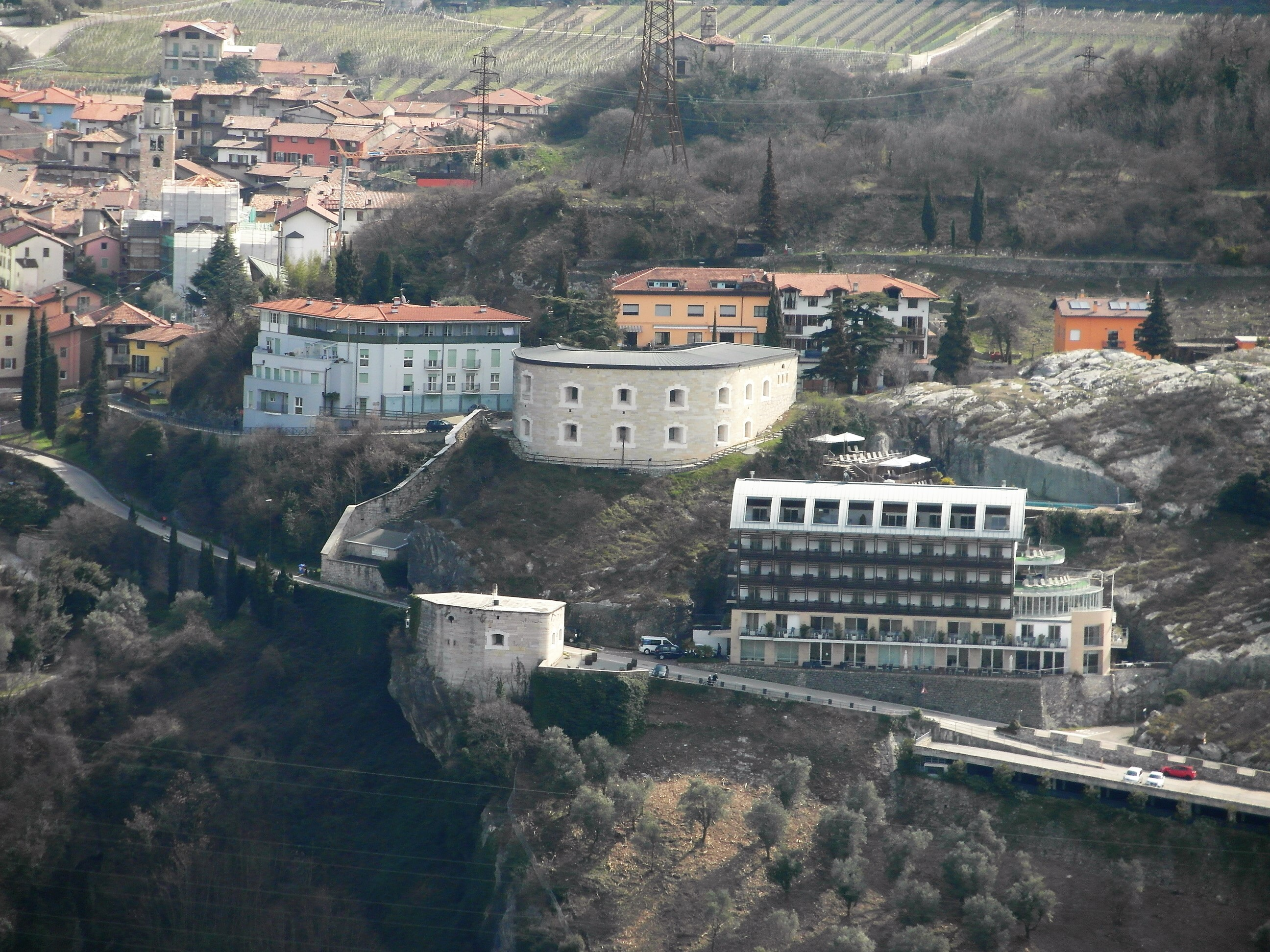
Nago roadblock

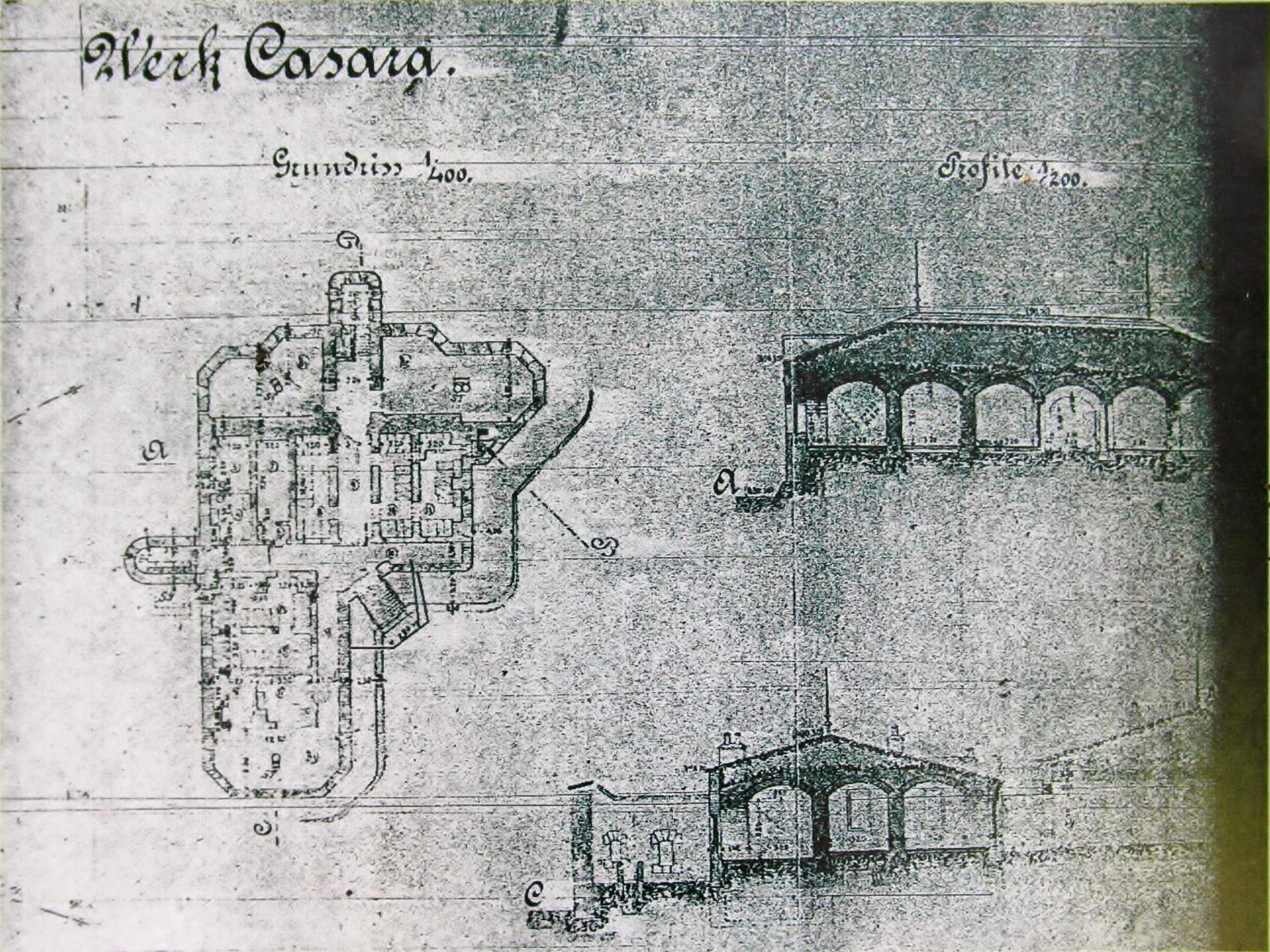
Plan of Casara works

Border section 3 - Lardaro Barrier: south of the Adamello-Presanella group, Larino (1860–1861), Fort Danzolino (1860 to 1862), Corno (1890 to 1894), Fort Revegler (1860–1862) and Carriola (1911–1915). The Lardaro lock secured the Giudicarie to the north and the confluence of the Valdaone to the east. This covered the rear of the Riva fortress and the flank of Trento.

Border section 3 - the Riva Fortress securing the roads around Lago d'Ampola and Lago di Ledro to Trento and the Adige Valley. Riva had the following structures:

- San Nicolo Battery (1860–1862)
- Monte Brione middle battery (1898–1900)
- Monte Brione North Battery (1860–1862, 1911–1915)
- Nago roadblock (1860–1862)
- Garda (1905 to 1909)

Blocking group Ponale consisted of:

- Ponale roadblock (1904–1918)
- Bellavista battery (1909)
- Ponale defensive wall
- Tombio Works (1907–1910)

Border section 4 - The Fortress of Trento and the Adige Barrier (Etschtalsperre), countering threats from the south (Adige Valley) and southeast from the Valsugana.

Fortress of Trento major structures:

- Buco di Vela roadblock (1860–1862)
- Doss di Sponde battery (1860–1862)
- Mattarello (1897–1900)
- Candrai Battery (1879–1882)
- Mandolin Blockhouse
- Fort Casara (1880–1881)
- Martignano (1878–1880)
- Civezzano (1870–1873)
- Cimirlo (1881–1882)
- Roncogno (1880–1882)
- San Rocco (1880–1884, 1902)
- Brussa ferro (1881–1882)
- Doss Fornas (1882–1883)
- Romagnano (1892–1915)
- Maranza (1881-1882)
- Marzola (1881-1882)

There were also many smaller works, armored machine-gun positions and concrete infantry strongpoints.

The Val di Non barrier consisted of the large Rocchetta roadblock (1860–64) securing Mezzolombardo (Welschmetz) in the Non Valley against the Val di Sole if a breakthrough over the Tonale Pass succeeded.

The Adige-Arsa Barrier consisted only of the unfinished Valmorbia works (1912–1915, also referred to as "Forte Pozzacchio") in Vallarsa. Further projects (Mattassone/Coni Zugna/Pasubio/Cornale and Vignola) did not get beyond the planning phase.

Border section 5 - Folgaria/Lavarone/Sette Comuni built between 1907 and 1913 and among the most modern fortresses in Austria-Hungary. It was in front of the line of the older works (Tenna, Colle delle benne, Mattarello and Romagnano) from the Vogl construction period.

Lavarone Group (Lafraun):

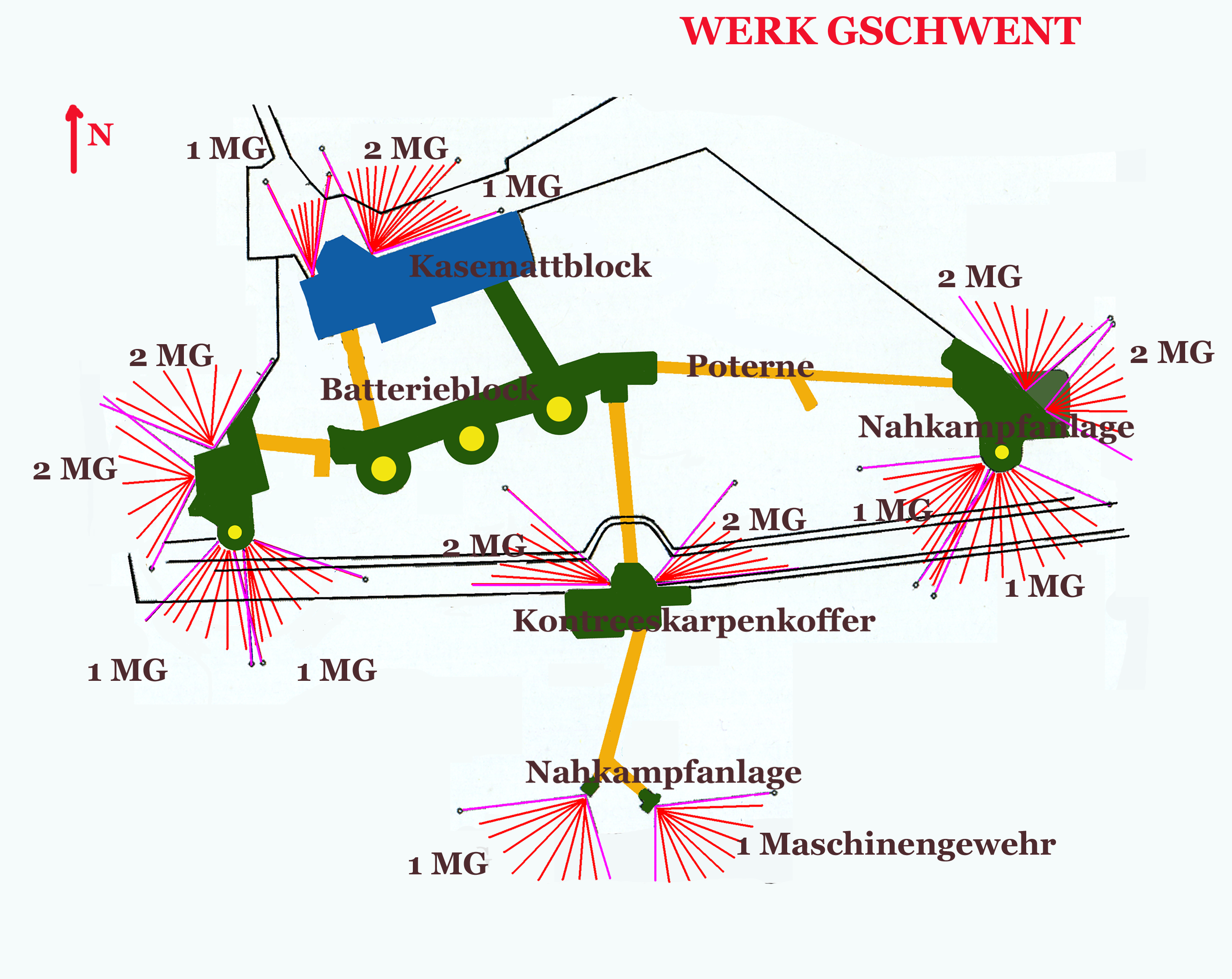
Plan showing the cover of fire from Gschwent

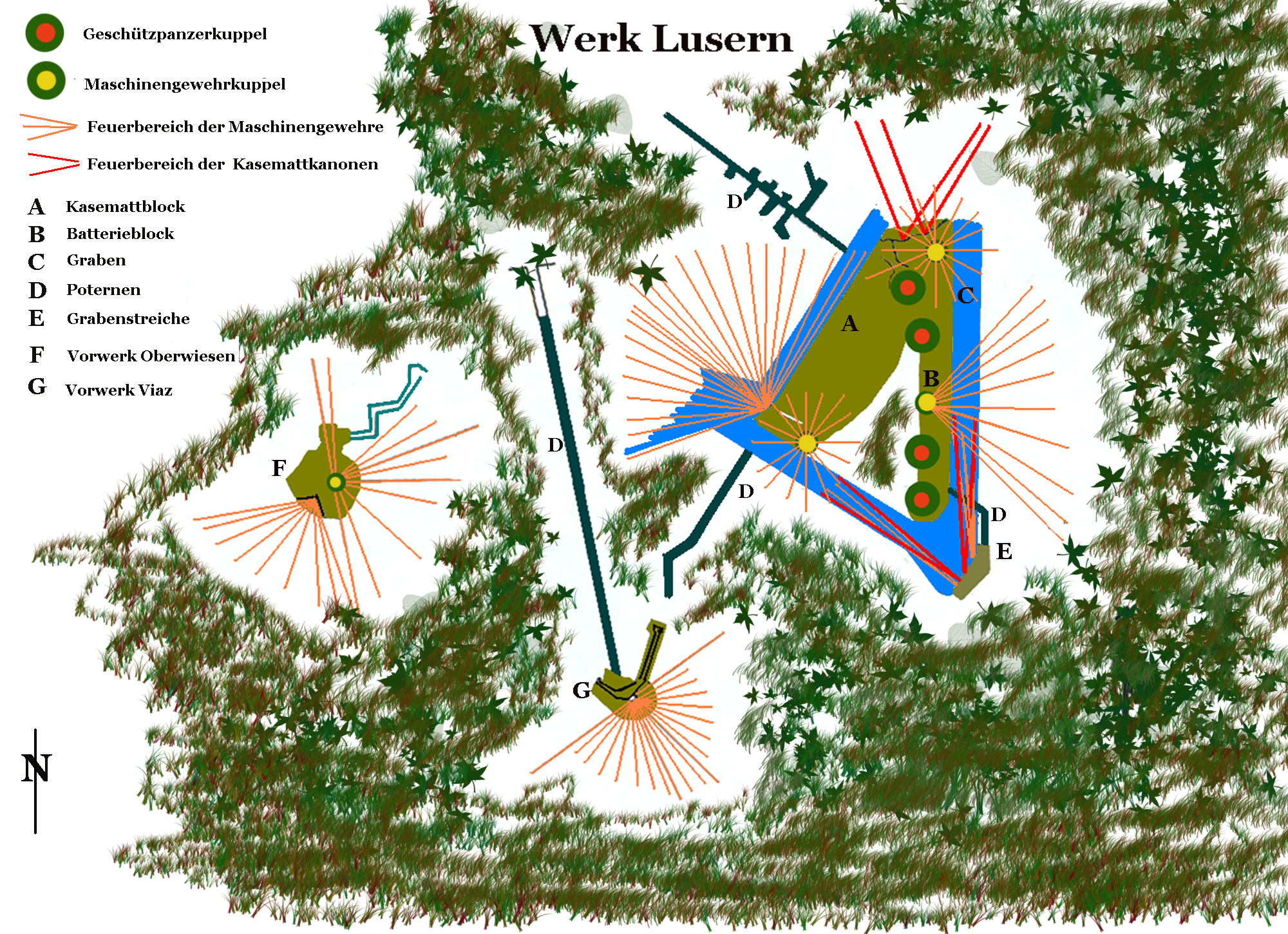
Plan showing cover of fire from Lusern

- Forte Belvedere Gschwent (Italian: Forte Belvedere di Lavarone, 1909–1912)
- Lusern (Italian: Campo di Luserna, 1907–1910)
- Verle (Italian: Forte di Busa di Verle, 1907–1911)
- Vezzena (1907–1912)
- Virti Command Post

Folgaria Group (Vielgereuth):

- Serrada (Italian: Dosso del Sommo, 1912–1915)
- Sommo (Italian: Sommo alto, 1912–1915)
- Sebastiano (also Cherle, 1909–1913)

Border section 6 - Valsugana - external works at Caldonazzo and Levico:

- Tenna (1884)
- Colle delle benne (1884)
- Busa Grande (1915)

=== Subrayon IV ===
Border section 7 - Kreuzberg Pass to Lusia Pass (Fiemme Valley)

Border section 8 - Lusia Pass to Monte Mesola. The Rolle Pass barrier consisted of the Paneveggio barrier, Fort Dossaccio (1889–1892, 1912) blocking the Travognolo Valley and the route from Fassa to the Fiemme Valley. Further back in the Pellegrino valley was the Moena Roadblock (1897–1899).

=== Subrayon V ===
Border section 9 - Monte Mesola to Gottrestal.

The Buchensteintal Barrier consisted only of the la Corte (1897–1900) and the Ruaz roadblock (1897–1900). They blocked the way from Alleghe to Canazei and the Pordoi Pass to Corvara.

Valparola Pass Barrier The Tre Sassi barrage (1897–1900) blocked access to the Val Badia.

Ampezzo Blocking Group consisting of Plätzwiese works (1889–1894) securing the Stolla Valley and the Höhlensteintal as well as the Landro works (1884–1892), securing the road from Cortina d'Ampezzo to Toblach and the Puster Valley.

Border section 10 - Gottrestal to the Carinthian border with the Sexten Barrier. Haideck works (1884–1889) and Mitterberg works (1884–1889) secured Sexten and the Kreuzberg Saddle.

== Rayon of Carinthia ==
In the Rayon of Carinthia, the subrayons were called sections. In 1915 he was under the command of Franz Rohr von Denta. The border from Krn to the Mediterranean Sea was not fortified and therefore not included in this scheme.

=== Section I ===
Kreuzberg Pass - Plöcken Pass - Stranigerspitze/Monte Cordin

=== Section II ===
Straningerspitze/Monte Cordin - Naßfeld Pass - Shinouz/it:Monte Scinauz

The Malborgeth Barrier consisted only of Fort Hensel "A" (1881–1884) and "B" (1881–1890) near the village of Malborgeth in the Canale Valley . They blocked the road from Pontafel to Tarvis and Villach in Carinthia. Fort Hensel was not referred to as a work, but as a fort because it was named after a person and not, as was more common, after a location. It was named after Captain Friedrich Hensel, who fell here in 1809 in the war against Napoleon.

=== Section III ===
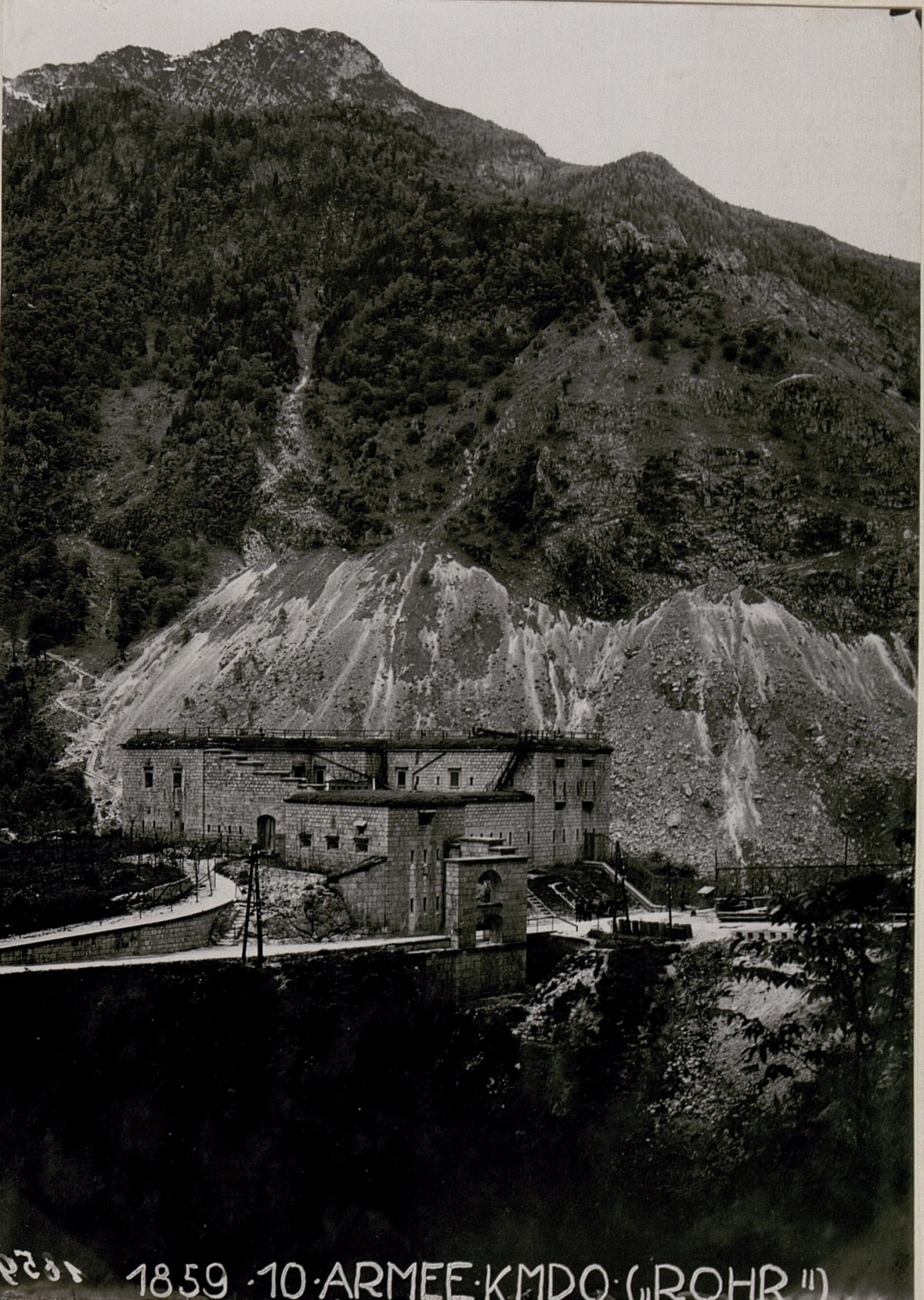
Flitscher Klause

Shinouz/it:Monte Scinauz- Predil Pass - Rombon

In the Seebachtal, the Predil Battery/Predilsattel (1897 to 1899) and Raibl Blockhouse (1885 to 1887, also called Seewerk Raibl, Raiblsee or Seebachtalsperre bei Raibl ) works blocked access through the Seebachtal and the Predil pass to Carinthia. Shortly after the factory directly on the Predil pass, there was also the Fort Predil (1850) on the Krainer side.

=== Section IV ===
Rombon - Krn

Fort Hermann (1897–1900) and Flitscher Klause (1880–1882) above Bovec (Flitsch) (in modern Slovenia) prevented a breakthrough into Austria from the Isonzo valley via the Predil Pass. Unusually "Fort Hermann" was not referred to as a works but as a fort. It was named after captain Johann Hermann von Hermannsdorf, who fell here in 1809 in the war against Napoleon. Guarding the Idrijca Viaduct was a 2 story structure called Guardhouse Baccia on the Eastern end of the viaduct. The viaduct was very important because it led to the Tolmein (Tolmin) bridgehead.

== See also ==
- Italian fortifications on the Austro-Hungarian border
- Mines on the Italian front (World War I)
- Séré de Rivières system
- Viktor Dankl von Krasnik
- Alpine Wall
