= Mitterberg works =

19th-century Austro-Hungarian fort

Coordinates: 46.6991°N 12.3682°E

Fort Mitterberg is an Austro-Hungarian fortification built in the Northern Italian region of Veneto. Mitterberg was constructed between 1885 and 1889, on the ridge of Monte Elmo. The fort was meant to guard the Kreuzbergsattel (Kreuzberg Saddle), a mountain pass through the Galital Alps in what was once the Austro-Hungarian province of Carinthia. Since 1891, the fort had been equipped with a 5 hp generator for power. Since at that time rapid advancements in artillery were being made, by 1909, the fort was obsolete. When war broke out in August 1914, the fort was readied for war by laying dense belts of barbed wire, deploying mines, and clearing fields of fire for the guns.

== Armament ==
- 3 M80 12cm guns
- 3 M5 10cm guns
- 4 11mm machine guns
- 1 60cm spotlight
- 1 30cm spotlight
- 2 25cm spotlights
- 1 armored observation turret

== Crews ==
- Peacetime: 1 officer and 24 enlisted men
- Wartime: 4 officers and 160 enlisted men

== World War I ==
Due to the weakness of the fort, the guns were removed in January 1915 to field positions nearby. Although the fort's grounds had received 160 shells of various calibers, only 12 28cm shells struck the fort. Until 1917, it was used to deceive the Italians into thinking that Austrian troops were based there. The Austrians accomplished this by burning wet wood to create black smoke during the day, and leaving the lights on at night.

== Post-war ==
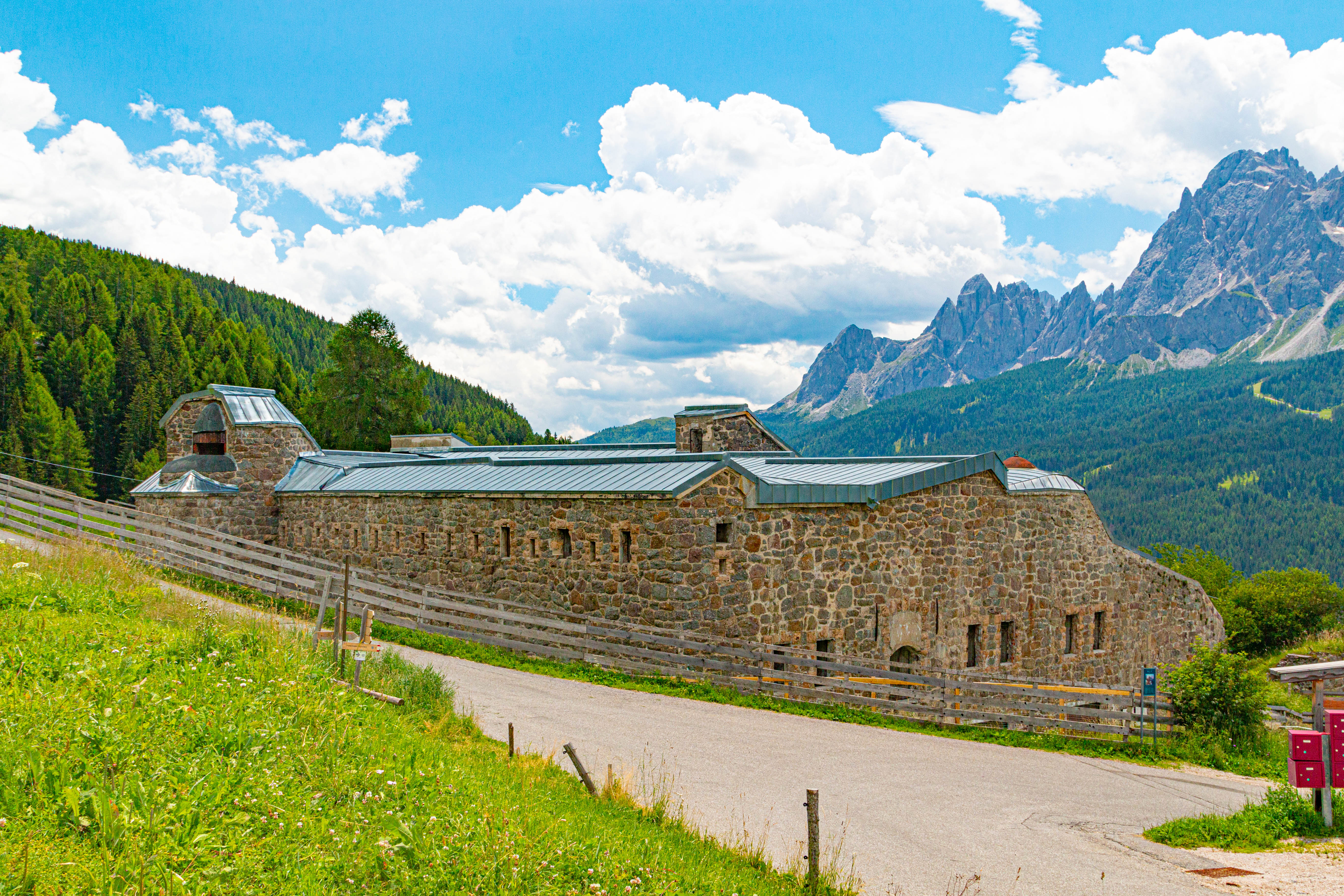
Fort Mitterberg today.

In 1917, it housed a local farming family, and after the war was a depot for the Italian army. At the end of the 1970s, a local association called Dolomitenfreunde asked for permission to make the fort into a museum and was denied. Fort Mitterberg is one of the only Austrian forts in excellent condition, although the public cannot enter because it is still owned by the Italian army.

== See also ==
- Austro-Hungarian fortifications on the Italian border
