= Haideck works =

19th-century Austro-Hungarian fort

Coordinates: 46°41′5″N 12°21′31″E

The Haideck Works, technically the Haideck Roadblock, is an Austro-Hungarian fortification built in the Northern Italian province of Veneto. The fort had the job of blocking access to the Sexten Valley from its seat near the town of Sexten or Sesto. The fort was built between 1884 and 1889, and until World War I, underwent multiple additions to the structure and amenities. Despite this, the work majorly remained the same as when it was built, becoming more outdated by the year. With the outbreak of war in August 1914, the fort was put on high alert, with barbed wire being laid out, the fields of fire were cleared and the guns were test fired. It was known that the fort could not withstand modern artillery, so a cavern was drilled out for the infantry and the guns were moved to field positions nearby.

== Armament ==
The fort was armed with:

- 2 M80 12cm howitzers in minimal embrasures
- 3 10cm M5 howitzers in armored turrets
- 4 11mm machine guns
- 1 8mm machine gun

== World War I ==
Since the guns had been moved to field positions, and the infantry were in the drilled out cavern, when the Italians shelled the fort on 28 July 1915, nobody was hurt. Despite the fort being empty when it was shelled, the fort suffered a few major hits and punctures through the roof. The fort was also shelled on 31 July 1915, by Italian 28cm howitzers, causing major damage. The Austrians suspected the Italians would shell Haideck, so they lit it up as brightly as possible to deceive the Italians. After this shelling, the fort was partially salvaged by the Austrians to build field positions nearby. Until the battle of Caporetto in 1917, the fort was used as a storage and supply depot for the second line of defense.

== Post-war ==
Fort Haideck was partially demolished in 1918, and stones from it were used to re-built the village of Sexten. Part of the facade was used to re-build the steps of the church in Sexten which had been mercilessly shelled by the Italians.

== See also ==
- Austro-Hungarian fortifications on the Italian border
