= Raibl Blockhouse =

Austro-Hungarian fortification

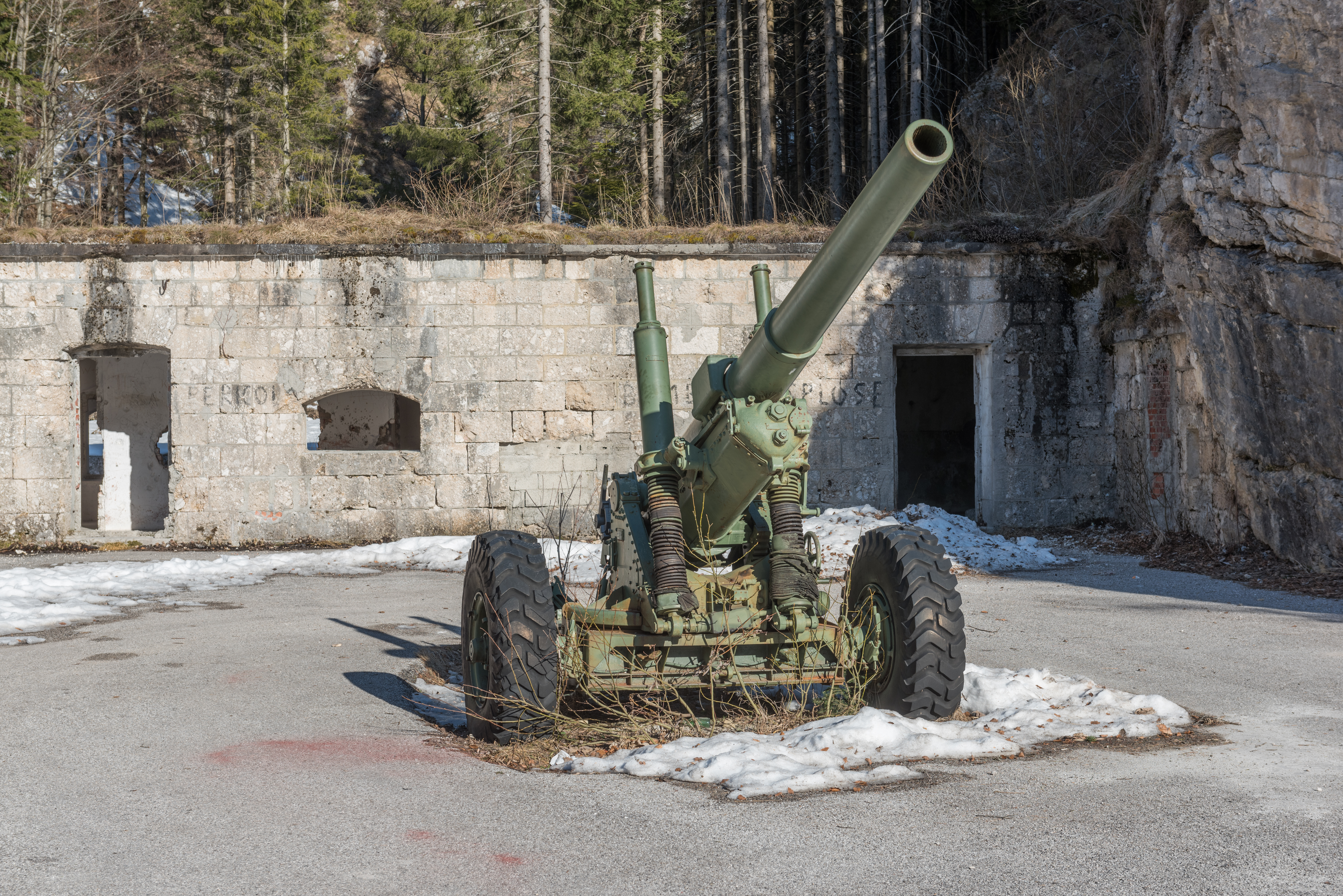
The ruins of the Raibl Blockhouse remain in an ever-increasing state of disrepair and abandonment.

The Raibl Blockhouse, also known as Fort Gota Aibl, is an Austro-Hungarian fortification built on what is now the Italian-Slovenian border. Work began in the spring of 1885 and ended in July 1887. Raibl is part of the Austro-Hungarian fortifications on Lake Predil, and was connected to Depot Predil, also known as Fort Predil, by an underground passage. Raibl’s armament was 3 9 cm quick-firing guns and 2 8 mm machine guns with room for 2 more. By the time World War I started, Raibl was obsolete and couldn't even repel an attack effectively, so the decision was made to remove the guns and abandon the fort. The Italians didn't know this and shelled the fort extensively from May to August 1915. On July 31, 1915, a 30.5 cm shelled exploded nearby and tore a gash through one of the armored gun shields.
