= Monte Brione North Battery =

Austro-Hungarian fortification in Trentino, Italy

Coordinates: 45.8909°N 10.8741°E

Monte Brione North Battery, also known as Nordbatterie or Fort St. Alexander, is an Austro-Hungarian fortification built in the Northern Italian town of Riva Del Garda. While some sources say that St. Alexander was built between 1860 and 1862, others say 1880-81. St. Alexander was part of the first fortifications built near Riva Del Garda, and the mountain that Alexander is built on, Monte Brione, is one of the only places in the world where all 3 types of Austro-Hungarian fortifications can be found. Alexander is built out of quarried stone, and was partially renovated in 1908, and in 1911 it was equipped with a radiotelegraphy machine.

== Armament ==
The fort was armed with six 12cm Model 1861 guns and four 15cm guns of an unspecified type.

At the turn of the 20th century, Fort St. Alexander's main job was to support the new Fort Garda on the south end of Monte Brione. During World War I, the guns were removed and black-painted logs were set in their place.

== Post-war ==
Today the remains of the fort are owned by the Municipality of Riva Del Garda, and is being redeveloped and slowly uncovered from the vegetation and preserving the remaining structure.
