= Fort Predil =

Austro-Hungarian fortification in Slovenia

Coordinates: 46°25′16″N 13°35′17″E

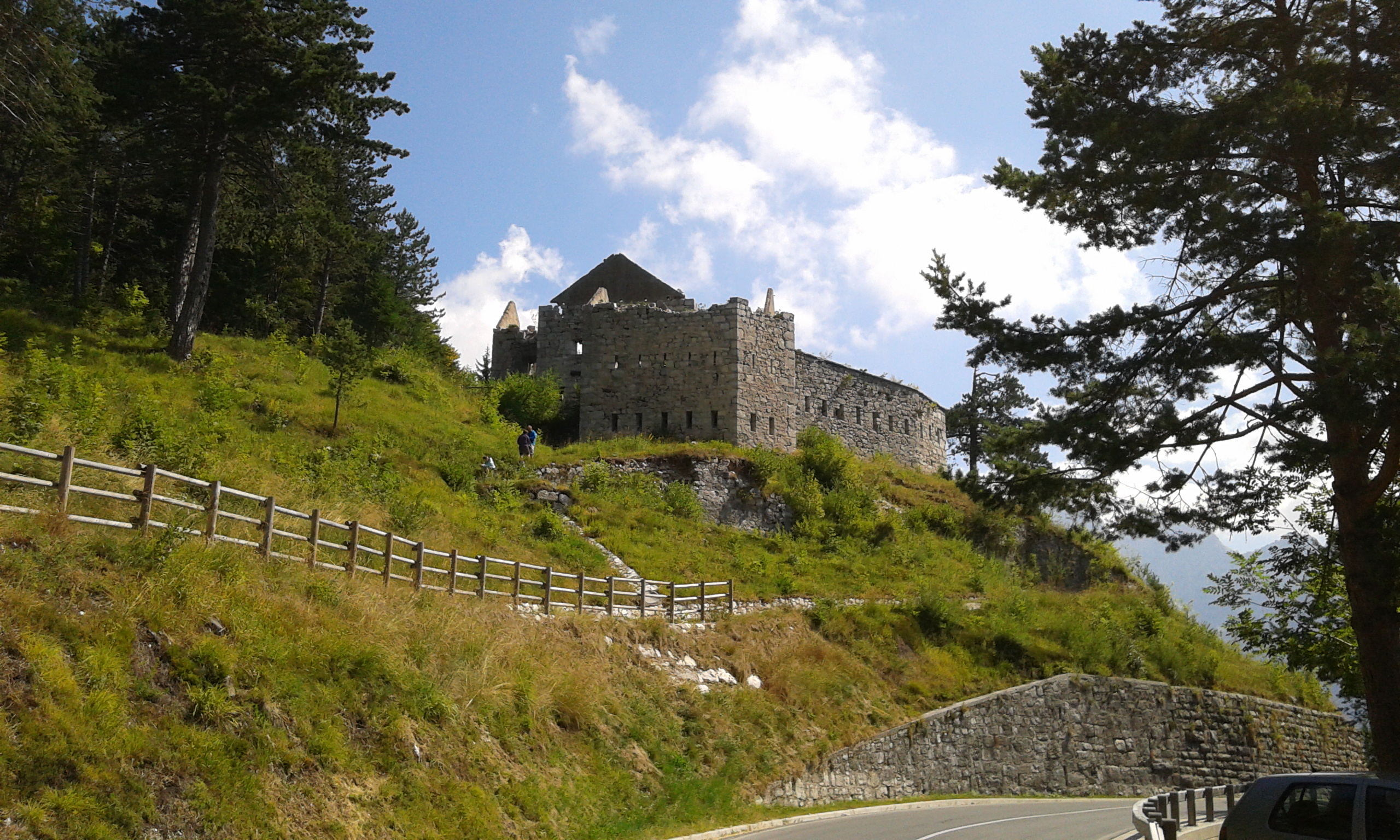
The ruins of the Predil Depot stand guard over the road leading into Italy from Slovenia.

The Predil Depot, also known as the Predil Roadblock (German: Strassensperre Predil), is a fortification built by Austria-Hungary to guard against an Italian attack through the Predil Pass. Despite the fact that it was built to guard against Italy, the fortification now lies in Slovenia. Over the years the fort was armed with guns of various calibers, ranging from 9 cm to 15 cm. Originally, there was a log fortification where the ruins of the masonry fort lie today. Today the structure is in good shape on the outside, while the inside has been altered and several areas have been removed.
