= Fort Revegler =

Austro-Hungarian fortification in the Trentino, Italy

Coordinates: 45°57′44″N 10°39′18″E

Fort Revegler, (Italian: Forte Revegler, German: Strassensperre Revegler), is an Austro-Hungarian fortification built in Northern Italy. Work started in June 1860 and was finished in May 1861. It’s job was to block the Storo-Tione road. Revegler is the only fort of its group to have a second floor. Revegler’s armament was three 8-cm guns according to one source. Another source states two 12-cm guns, one 8-cm gun, and two 30-cm spotlights.

== Post-World War I to today ==
At the beginning of the war with Italy in May 1915, the guns were removed and it was turned into a warehouse. In November 1918, the fort was occupied by Italian infantry and was closed until after World War II. It was demolished and the stone was re-used to build the convent of Condino.
