= Forte Ceraino =

Coordinates: 45°34′33″N 10°49′53″E

Fort Ceraino, also known as Fort Hlawaty, is a fortification built by Austria-Hungary near the municipality of Ceraino in Northern Italy. Ceraino was built between 1850 and 1851 at an altitude of 236m on Monte Pastello. Ceraino was part of a group of fortifications called Rivoli-Ceraino group. Originally, Ceraino was named Fort Hlawaty, named after the main architect of the fortifications of Verona, Lieutenant Field Marshal Johann von Hlavaty. Like most forts of the time, Ceraino was built out of quarried stone.

Fort Ceraino is surrounded by a moat that is 5m wide and 3-4m deep, which was chiseled out of stone. Within the moat are numerous rifle slits. Ceraino's garrison was between ½ and ¾ of an infantry company and between 100 and 115 artillery crew members.

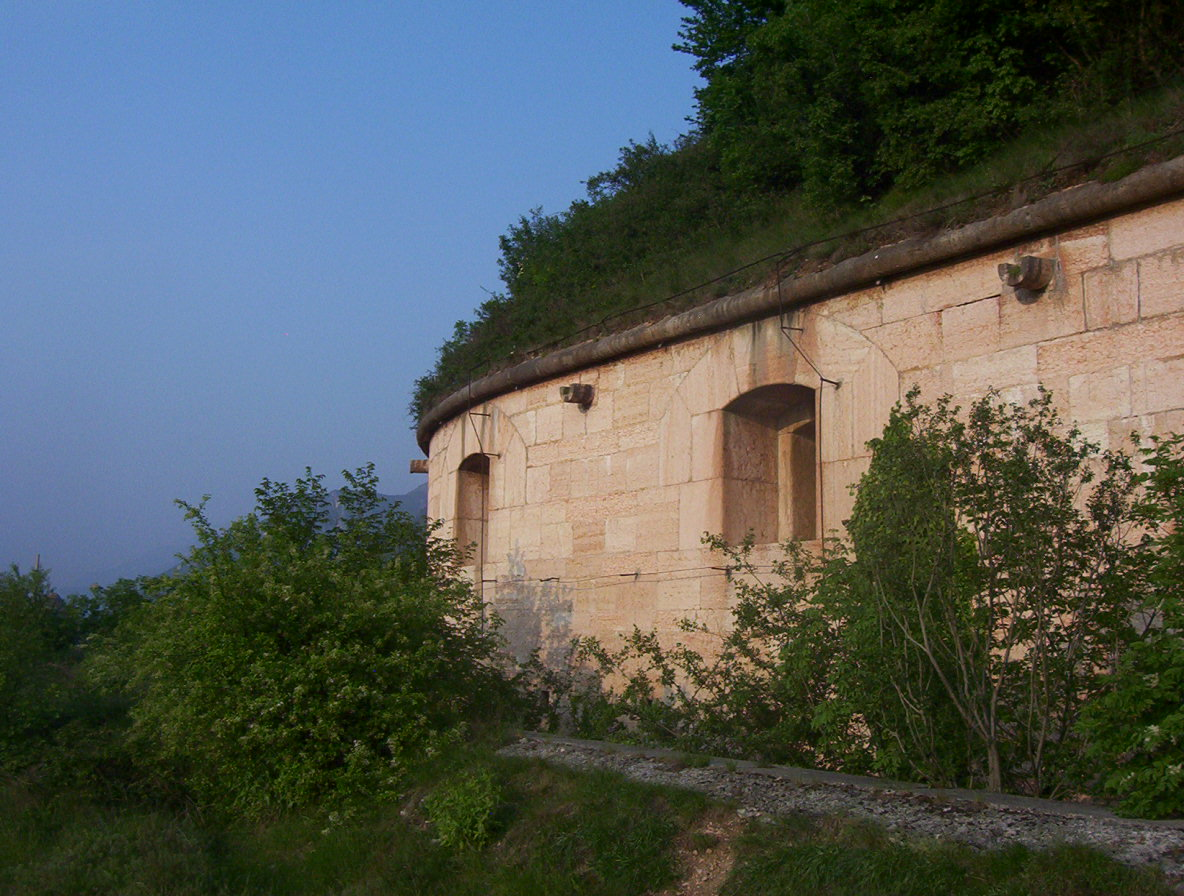
The casemates for the Quick-firing guns.

== Armament ==
- 15 guns of various calibers
- 2 batteries of 4 quick-firing guns

== Post Austro-Prussian War of 1866 ==
After Italy received the fort as part of Lombardy, it was renamed Fort Ceraino, and its guns were turned around so that they could fire towards the Austro-Hungarian border.
