= Fort Gomagoi =

Austro-Hungarian fortification that gaurded the Stelvio Pass

Coordinates: 46°34′29″N 10°32′20″E

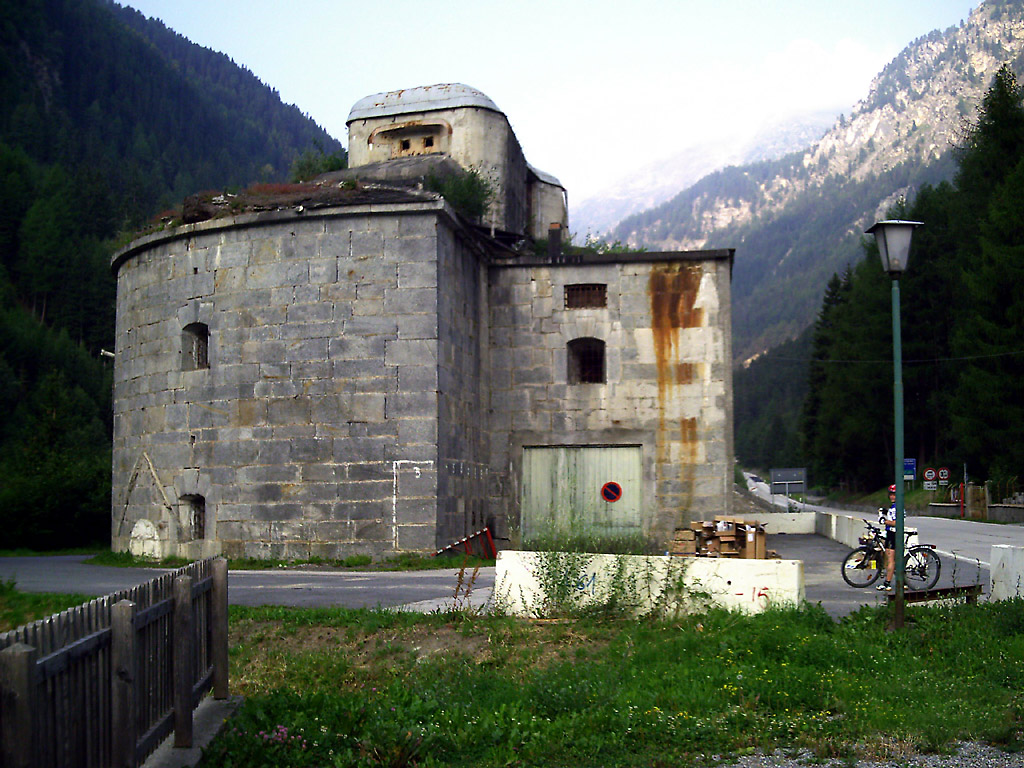
Part of Gomagoi which is now split by a local highway leading to the Stelvio Pass.

The Gomagoi Roadblock (Italian: Forte di Gomagoi, German: Werk Gomagoi, Straßensperre Gomagoi) is an Austro-Hungarian fortification built just after the loss of Lombardy to Italy in 1859. The fort was built in just 1 year, 1860–61, and was built out of local stone. Gomagoi was built to guard the Stelvio Pass, and to secure the southern flank of the vital Brenner Pass. The fort was more of an imaginary obstacle rather than a physical one because it was only moderately armed. The roadblock was renovated several times, with the most notable being in 1899, with the walls being reinforced, and rifle slits being added. Another notable instance was 1912, when the rifle gallery was reconstructed, a machine gun gallery was added, and the addition of Škoda armored shields. Gomagoi was crewed by 2 officers and 133 enlisted men. When war broke out in August 1914, Gomagoi was made ready for war. This was carried out by laying minefields, barbed wire, and clearing the fields of fire for the guns. Shortly after the outbreak of war with Italy, the guns were removed. For the rest of the war it would act as a supply depot and infantry barracks.

== Armament ==
- 4 9 cm M04 field guns
- 2 9 cm M75/96 field guns
- 1 8 cm M95 field gun
- 5 8mm M.07 Schwarzlose machine guns
- 2 30 cm acetylene spotlights
- 1 25 cm acetylene spotlight

== Post World War I ==
Between 1963-64, 4 out of the 6 casemates were removed to widen the road to the Stelvio Pass. As of 2011, the roadblock is shared by the local municipality and is a warehouse for the road administration.
