= Fort Tombio =

Austro-Hungarian fortification in Riva Del Garda, Italy.

Coordinates: 45°54′33″N 10°49′27″E

Fort Tombio, (Italian: Forte Tombio, German: Werk Tombio), is an Austro-Hungarian fortification built on the outskirts of Riva Del Garda in Northern Italy. Built between 1909 and 1914, Tombio was one of the newest fortifications in the Riva fortress system. Like the Ponale Roadblock, Tombio wasn’t just 1 structure, it was 6 different positions. The main part of the fortifications was 2 floors and was made out of reinforced concrete. A part of the fort called Tombio Piccolo (Small Tombio) guarded the road of Campi-Lunzo. Small Tombio consisted of a concrete blockhouse and a few defensive minefields.

Originally the fort was supposed to be armed with 2 10 cm howitzers in armored domes and 2 9 cm quick-firing guns. This was changed in 1906, when 2 more 10 cm howitzers and 2 armored machine gun posts were added to the plans. Unlike the other fortifications nearby, Tombio wasn’t subjected to a heavy bombardment by the Italians during World War I. The damage that is seen today is because of steel salvagers in the 1930s. Tombio is surrounded by a moat that was carved out of rock, and had its own observation turret.
