= Fort Ponale =

Austro-Hungarian roadblock near Lake Garda, Italy

Coordinates: 45°52′21″N 10°50′14″E

Fort Ponale (Italian: Tagliata del Ponale, German: Strassensperre Ponale), also known as Forte Teodosio because of the Roman coins found nearby dating to the reign of Emperor Theodosius, and not to be confused with Fort Ampola, is an Austro-Hungarian fortification built near Lake Garda in Northern Italy. Fort Ponale was built between 1904 and 1905, and was renovated in 1911, 1913–14, and 1916. Unlike most fortifications of the time, Ponale wasn’t just 1 structure, it was 5. The highest of the 5 was built 170 m (561 ft) above the lake’s surface, while the lowest was at the lake’s edge.

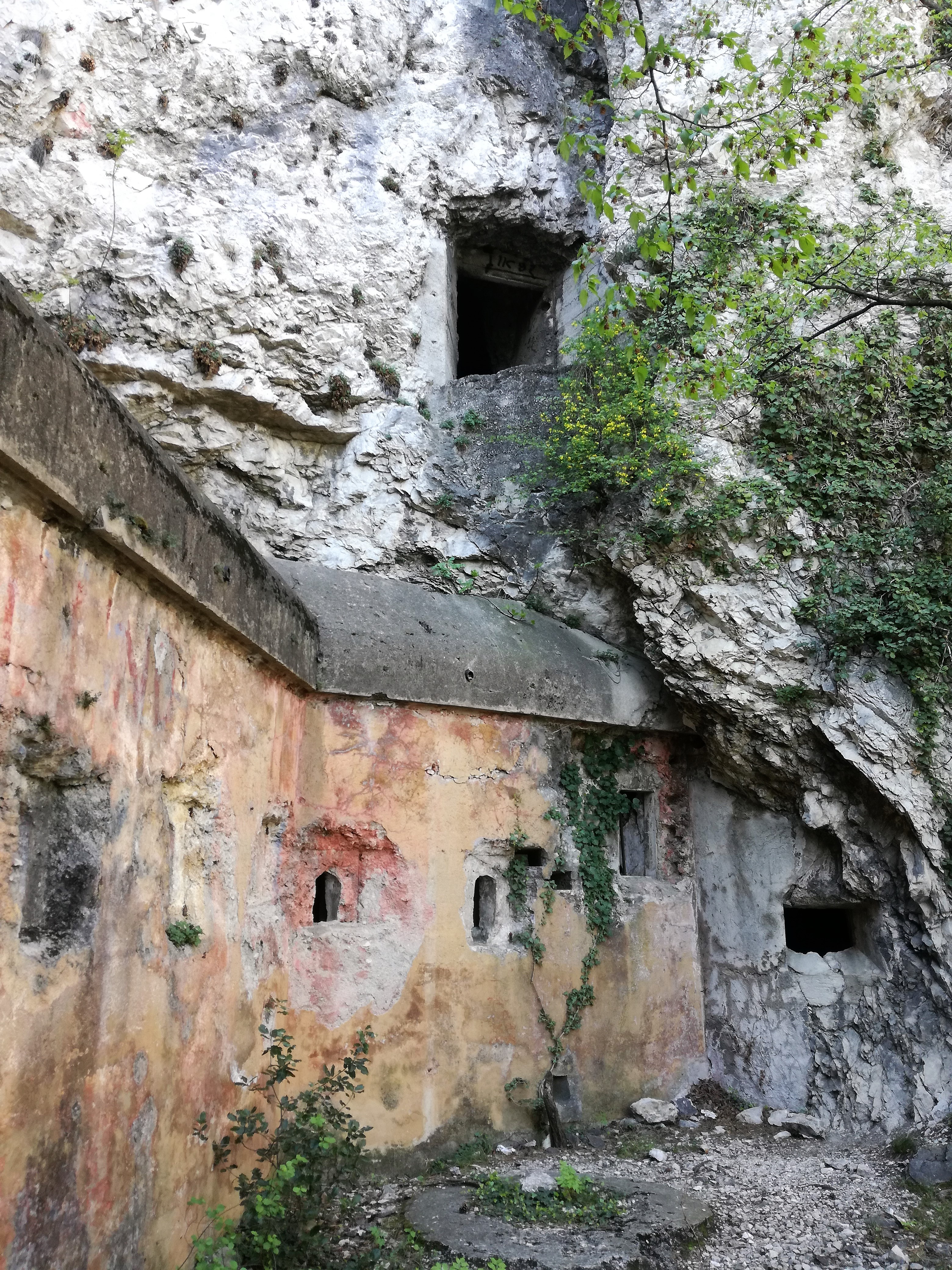
Part of the armored position for the riflemen added between 1913 and 1914.

All of the different parts of Ponale were connected by a maze of trenches, tunnels and field positions. Despite the recent renovations in 1911, the roadblock was updated to withstand modern artillery in 1913 and 1914. Also added in 1913-14 were 4 8 cm quick-firing guns, 2 facing towards Torbole and 2 facing towards Riva Del Garda, 2 machine gun posts, an armored observation dome, spotlight, and 3 armored positions for riflemen.

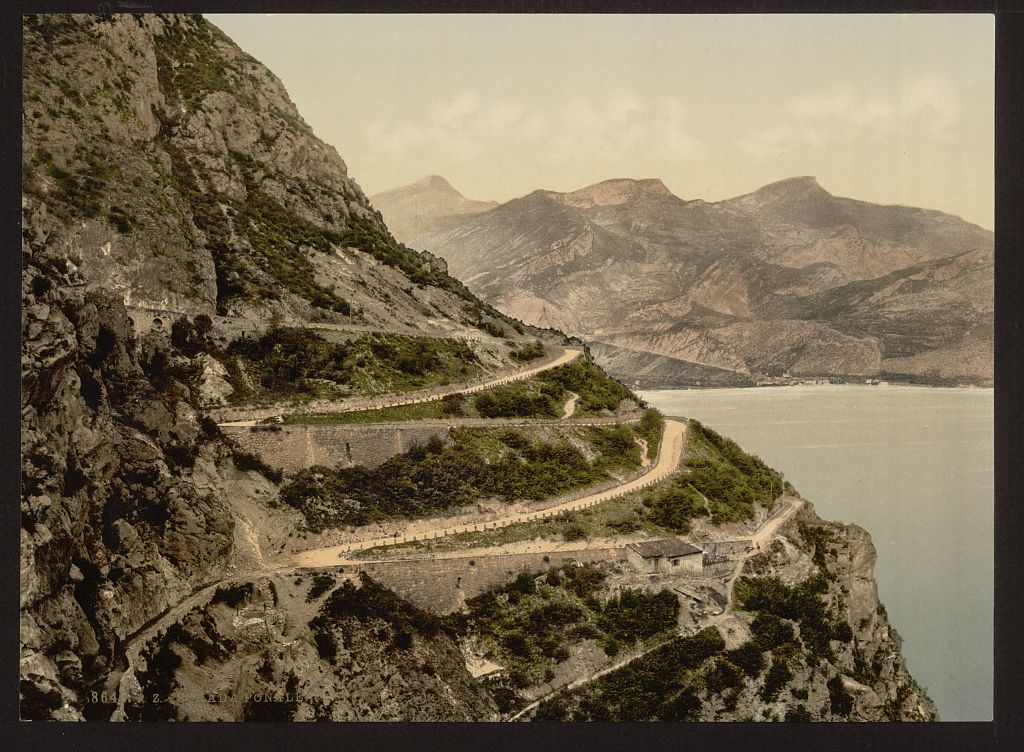
The road Ponale guarded

== Ponale defensive wall ==
Ponale was also connected to what is called the “Defensionmauer” or defensive wall. This consisted of concrete and rock firing positions that could dominate the valley. The wall was armed with machine guns and partially overlooks Lake Garda.
