= Forte Monte =

Fort Monte, also called Fort Mollinary, is an Austro-Hungarian fortification located in the Northern Italian province of Lombardy. Monte was built between 1849 and 1852, and was part of the Rivoli-Ceraino group of fortifications.

== Construction and Austro-Hungarian use ==
Monte had a moat that was 3m deep and 2-3m wide, dug into solid stone, with a drawbridge for entry. Within the moat, there was a caponier for flanking fire within the trench. Fort Monte was built “behind” Fort Rivoli and could fire across the Rivoli Plain, or support Fort Rivoli by firing in its direction.

The armament at Fort Monte consisted of five 12cm and 21cm howitzers, 12 quick-firing guns, and two mortars of an unspecified caliber. Within the fort there were 5 artillery embrasures on the second floor, with the first floor having 4 embrasures, with 1 facing south and 3 facing southeast.

== Italian use ==
After Italy gained Lombardy in 1866, the fort was renamed Fort Monte, because it resided upon a mountain at an altitude of 410m. The fort later fell out of use and was used for ammunition storage. In 1945, the retreating Germans blew up the stored munitions. Today, the fort remains heavily damaged and only overgrown ruins remain, accessible to hikers.

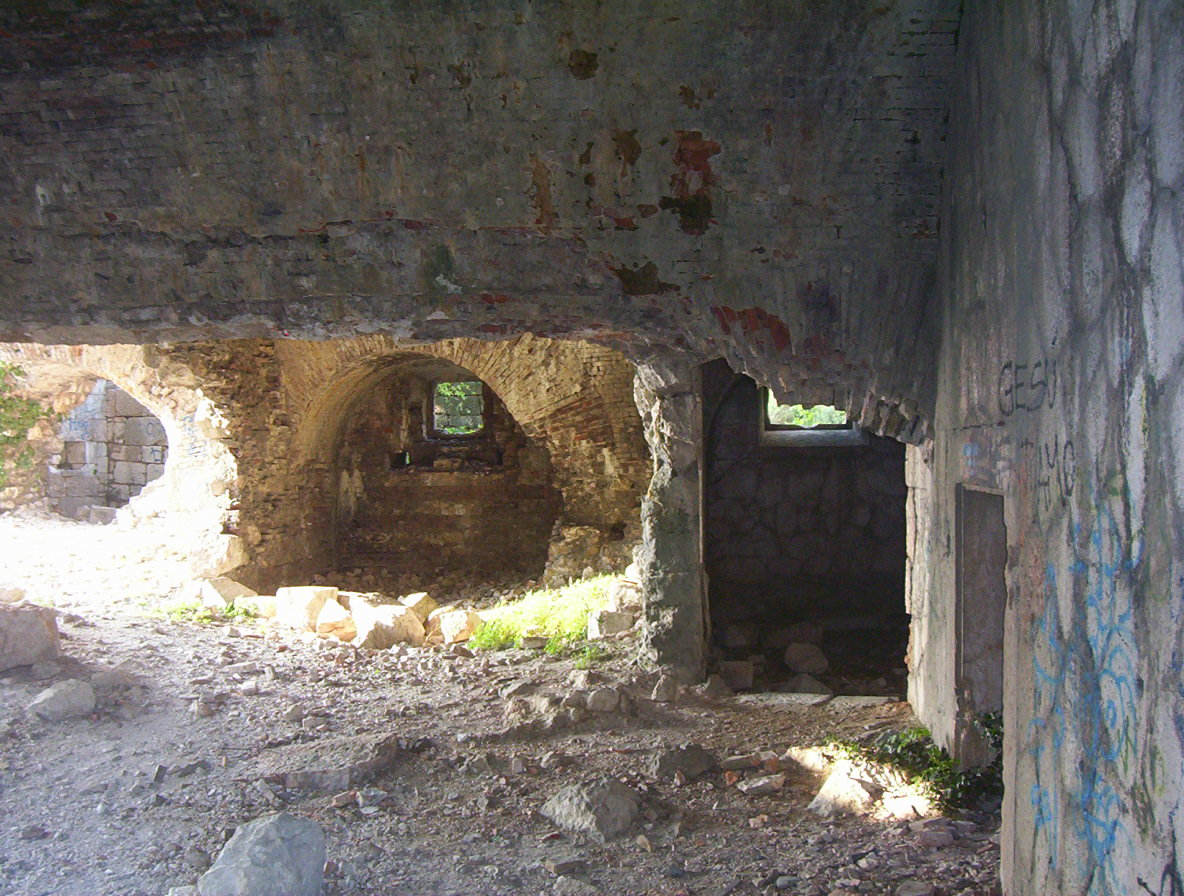
The ruined remains of the fort (2010)
