= Plätzwiese works =

Austro-Hungarian fortification in Veneto, Italy

The Platwiese roadblock is an Austro-Hungarian fortification built in the Veneto region of Northern Italy. Platwiese was built between 1889 and 1894, and was the first “armored” fortification built by Austria-Hungary. The construction was dragged out because of the relatively short construction period in the Dolomites. Due to the outdated materials used, by 1900 the structure was under consideration to be replaced by a more up-to-date structure. In the spring of 1915, a cave system was drilled nearby as a replacement structure for the guns.

On July 4th, 1915, the roadblock was lightly shelled by Italian heavy guns, with 4 hits being recorded. Of these, 1 punched through the stone armor of the front, and went deep into the building and exploded. The other notable hit was when a heavy shell split 1 of the 2 armored domes still emplaced at the fort. Until 1917, the fort was closely watched by Italian artillery, so the roadblock was never reinforced or occupied by infantry. The structure was made safe in 2011, and is now a protected monument. The roadblock was crewed by 5 officers and 104 enlisted men.

== Armament ==
- 2 15 cm M78 guns
- 3 8 mm M93 Machine guns in armored turrets
- 8 8 mm M93 Machine guns in armored casemates
- 4 rifle embrasures
- 1 30 cm spotlight
- 2 25 cm spotlights
