= Guardhouse Baccia =

Coordinates: 46°08′37″N 13°45′58″E

A view of the guardhouse from the plains below.

Guardhouse Baccia, also known as Wachhaus Baĉa, is an Austro-Hungarian fortification located in what is now modern-day Slovenia. Baccia is located north of the city of Gorizia, near the town of Bovec. The fort had the job of guarding the Idrijca railway bridge that led to Tolmin. It was very vital to the Tolmin (Tolmein) bridgehead, since it guarded the only rail line in. Baccia is the only fortification of its type located near Italy, as they are found most commonly in the Balkans. After World War I, the Italians added concrete machine gun bunkers on the western side of the railway bridge as part of the defenses against a Yugoslav invasion. During the Italian administration of the area, the guardhouse was surrounded by Belgian gates. Baccia was abandoned after World War II. The state of preservation on the outside is relatively good, while the inside has undergone tampering to remove the internal structure.
