= Forte Rivoli =

Coordinates: 45°34′28″N 10°49′08″E

Fort Rivoli, (Italian: Forte Rivoli), formerly known as Fort Wohlgemuth (German: Werk Wohlgemuth), is an Austro-Hungarian fortification built in present day Veneto in Northern Italy. Rivoli was built between 1849 and 1852, and overlooks the Adige River, and is a short distance from Lake Garda. Rivoli was built on top of Monte Castello, which literally translates to “Mount Castle”. The fort was originally called Fort Wohlgemuth, after a distinguished Austrian general who fought the Italians in 1848. After Veneto and Lombardy were ceded to Italy after the Austro-Prussian War of 1866, the Italians renamed the fort Rivoli.

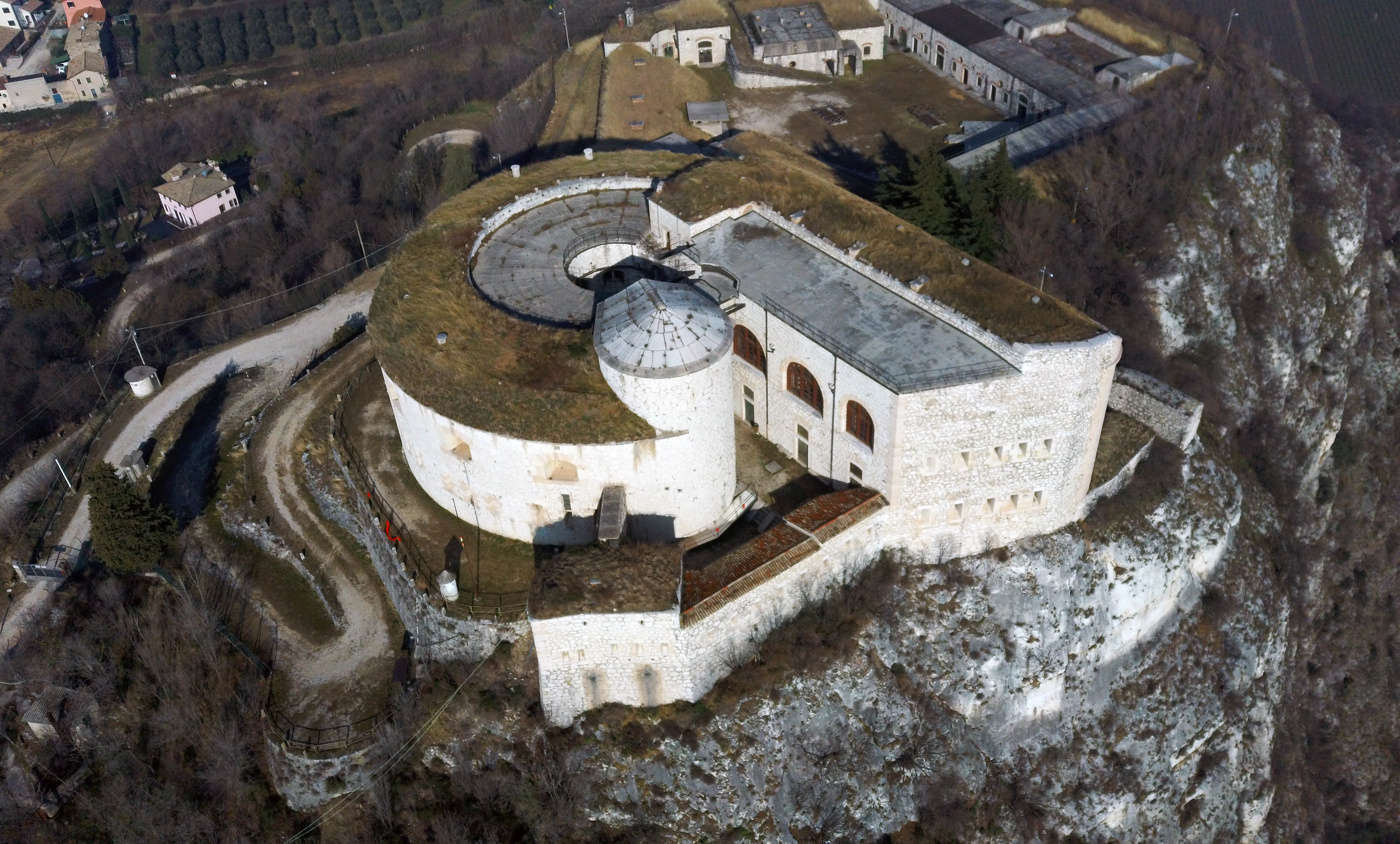
Fort Rivoli sits on heights overlooking the Adige River.

Rivoli was built like a Maximilian Tower, which has 2 floors and is round. Out of the group of fortifications Rivoli is in, it is the only one on the right side of the Adige River. Rivoli’s crew was anywhere from ½ to ¾ of an infantry company, and anywhere from 115-125 artillery crew members. Rivoli was armed with 17 guns of unspecified calibers. The Italian army used it as a storage facility after World War I, and it was occupied shortly by the Germans during World War II.

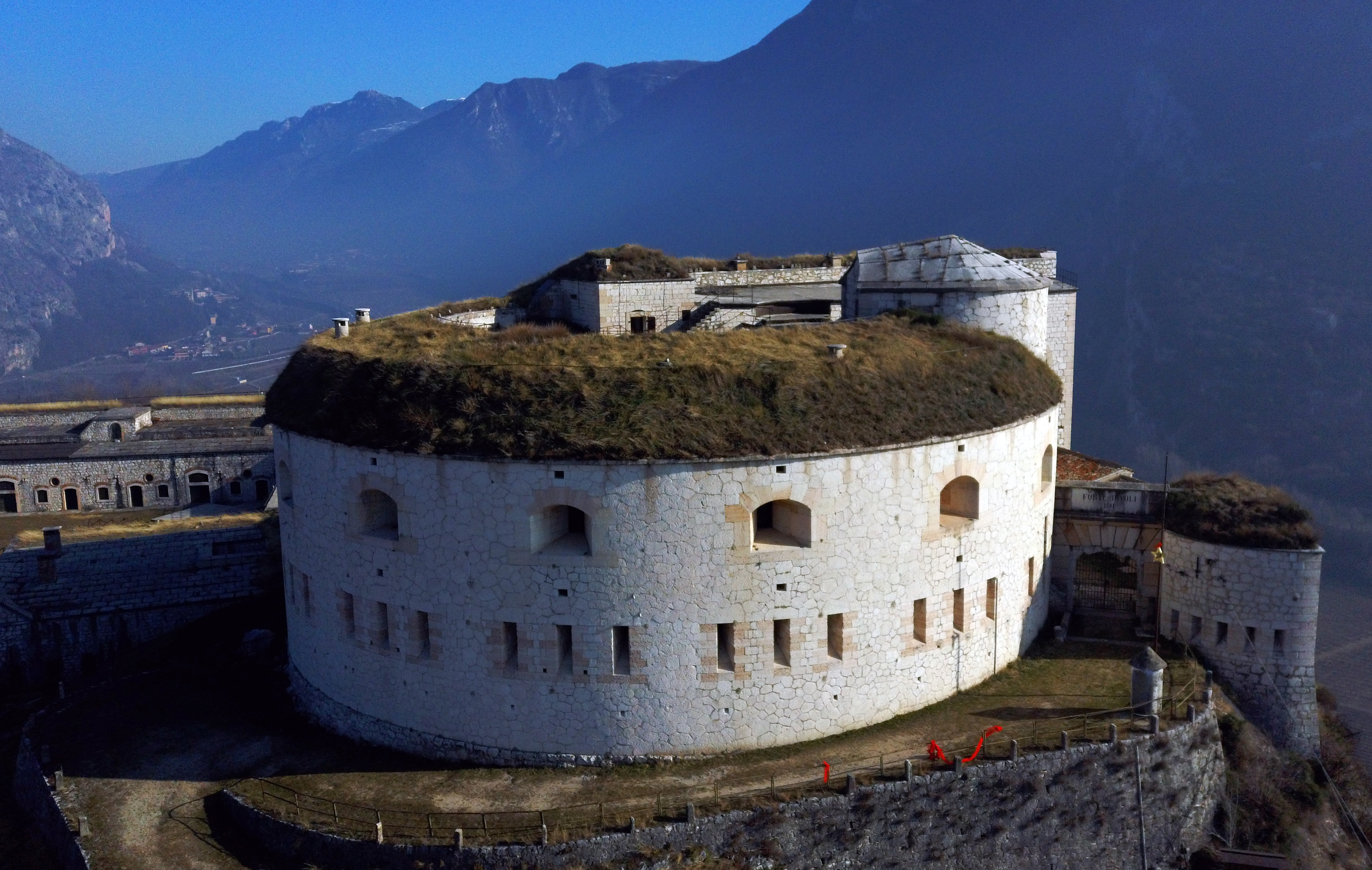
The bottom floor was for riflemen, while the upper floor housed the cannons

The fort currently operates as a museum.
