= Fortifications on Monte La Marzola =

Austro-Hungarian fortifications on Monte Marzola, Italy

The Maranza Battery, sometimes known as the Marzola Battery, is an Austro-Hungarian fortification built on Monte La Marzola, near the Northern Italian city of Trento. Maranza was built to prevent the circumvention of the batteries Doss Fornas and Brussa ferro. The battery was built between 1881-82, just below a small barracks and blockhouse called the Marzola Blockhouse. The battery housed 2 officers and 57 soldiers. The main armament of the battery was 2 9cm M75/96 field cannons, and later on in 1915, Maranza received 2 12cm guns from Romagnano works. The battery was built above the batteries of Brussa ferro and Doss Fornas.

The battery, like many others, was obsolete even before World War I, this is why it was disarmed and partially dismantled in 1915. Maranza was demolished in 1915, and today the ruins are in private hands. The documentary “The Invisible Fortress” directed by Sergio Damiani was filmed about the renovations done on Maranza.

The Marzola Blockhouse is an Austro-Hungarian fortification built just above the Maranza Battery in Trento, Italy. Monte La Marzola was considered crucial for the defense of Trento, this is why it was fortified beginning with the building of the blockhouse from 1881-82. The blockhouse was easily reached by cable car from Pra Maquart. Before 1914, Marzola was armed only with rifles. By 1915 however, 4 15cm howitzers were stationed outside the blockhouse. Permanently stationed there was 1 officer and 16 riflemen. Marzola was connected by trenches to the Maranza Battery just down the hill.

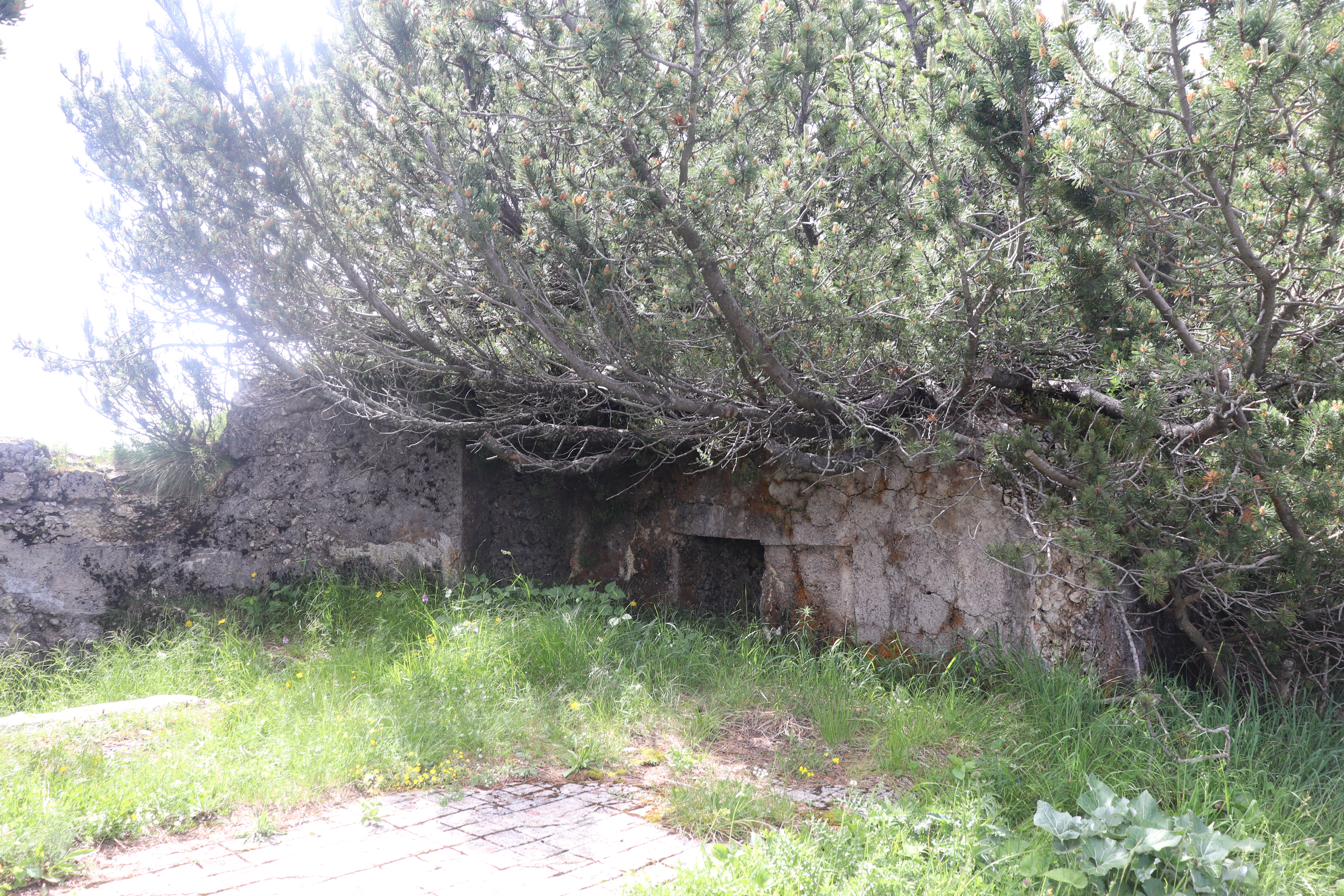
The remains of the Marzola blockhouse today.

== Post World War I ==
Recently, the blockhouse has undergone renovations, which was the re-digging of the trenches surrounding the fort.
