= Bellavista Battery =

Austro-Hungarian coastal battery on Lake Garda, Italy

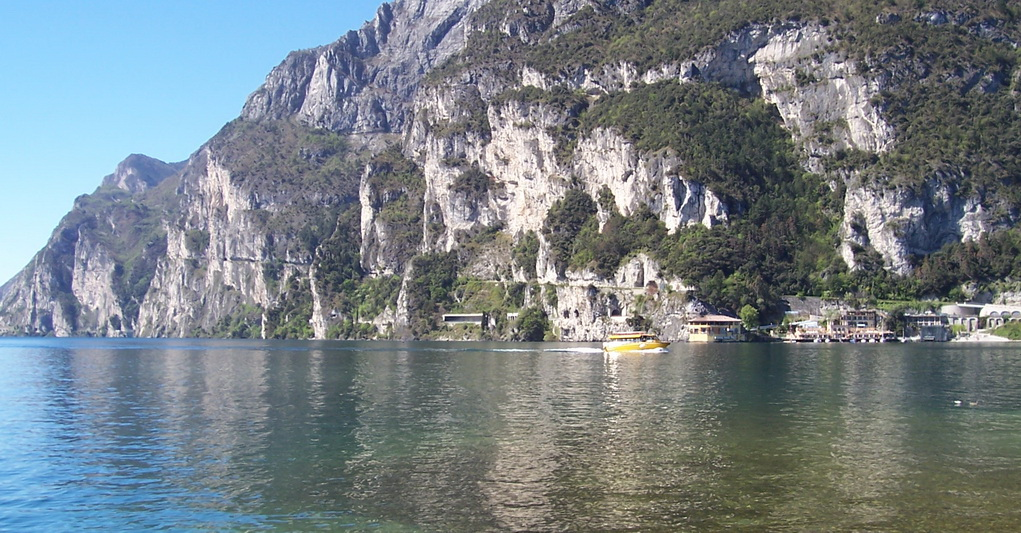
Battery Bellavista as seen from across Lake Garda

The Bellavista Battery, or "Strandbatterie” (Beach battery), is an Austro-Hungarian fortification built to block access to the port of Riva del Garda on the Northern shore of Lake Garda in Northern Italy. Work started on 5 December 1912, and concluded on 4 May 1913. Originally, the fort was just guns mounted in barbettes. When Italy declared war in May 1915, the guns were mounted in concrete casemates. While the casemates were being added, the fort was made able to resist an attack. An observation post, two ammunition warehouses, and a latrine were added. Bellavista's armament was 4 9 cm quick-firing guns with a range of 3.5 km.

Bellavista also had control of a minefield and a steel cable blocking access to the port of Riva. Bellavista had help from another battery across Lake Garda called Battery Lido (maybe Fort San Nicolo?).
