= Fort Hensel =

Austro-Hungarian fortification in Northern Italy

Coordinates: 46°30′31″N 13°27′10″E

Fort Hensel is an Austro-Hungarian fortification built in the Canale Valley in Northern Italy. Work started on Apr. 2, 1881, and ended on Sept. 18, 1883. Hensel is not designated a werk because it is named after a person, not more commonly a location. Fort Hensel is named after Capt. Friedrich Hensel, who died there fighting Napoleon's forces in 1809. Hensel's crew was 588 enlisted men and officers.

== Battery "A" ==
Battery A is a 2-story barracks with its guns mounted in casemates. Battery A's armament consisted of 2 12 cm guns, 2 15 cm guns, and 2 15 cm mortars. By World War I, the armament consisted of 2 10 cm howitzers in armored domes, and 4 9 cm guns.

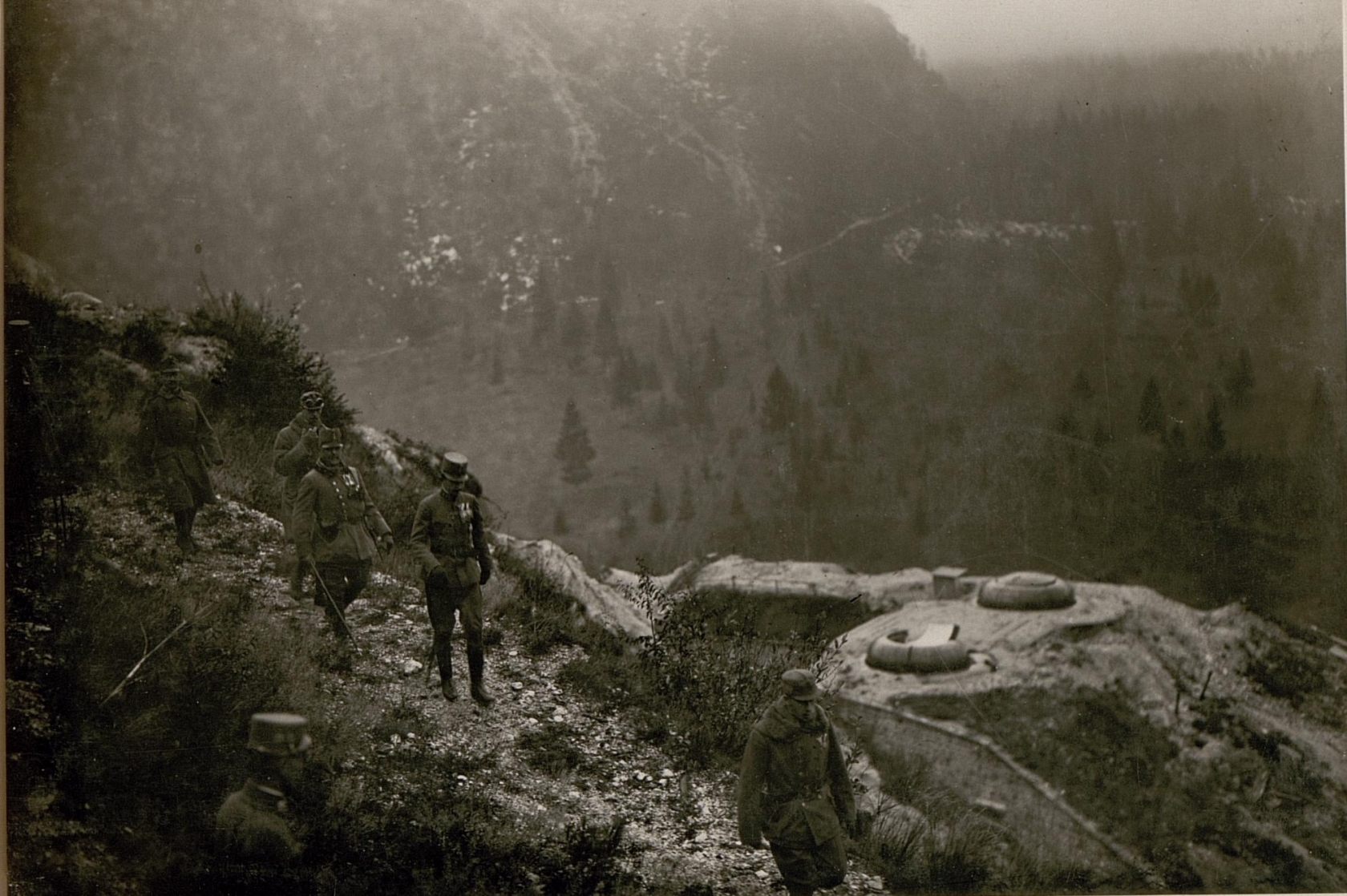
Prince Karl of Austria surveys Fort Hensel.

== Battery "B" ==
4 12 cm howitzers mounted in casemates, and 4 12 cm howitzers mounted in rotating cast-iron domes. The armament was unchanged by World War I. Between Batteries "A" and "B" there was an “emergency” battery of 2 10 cm howitzers.

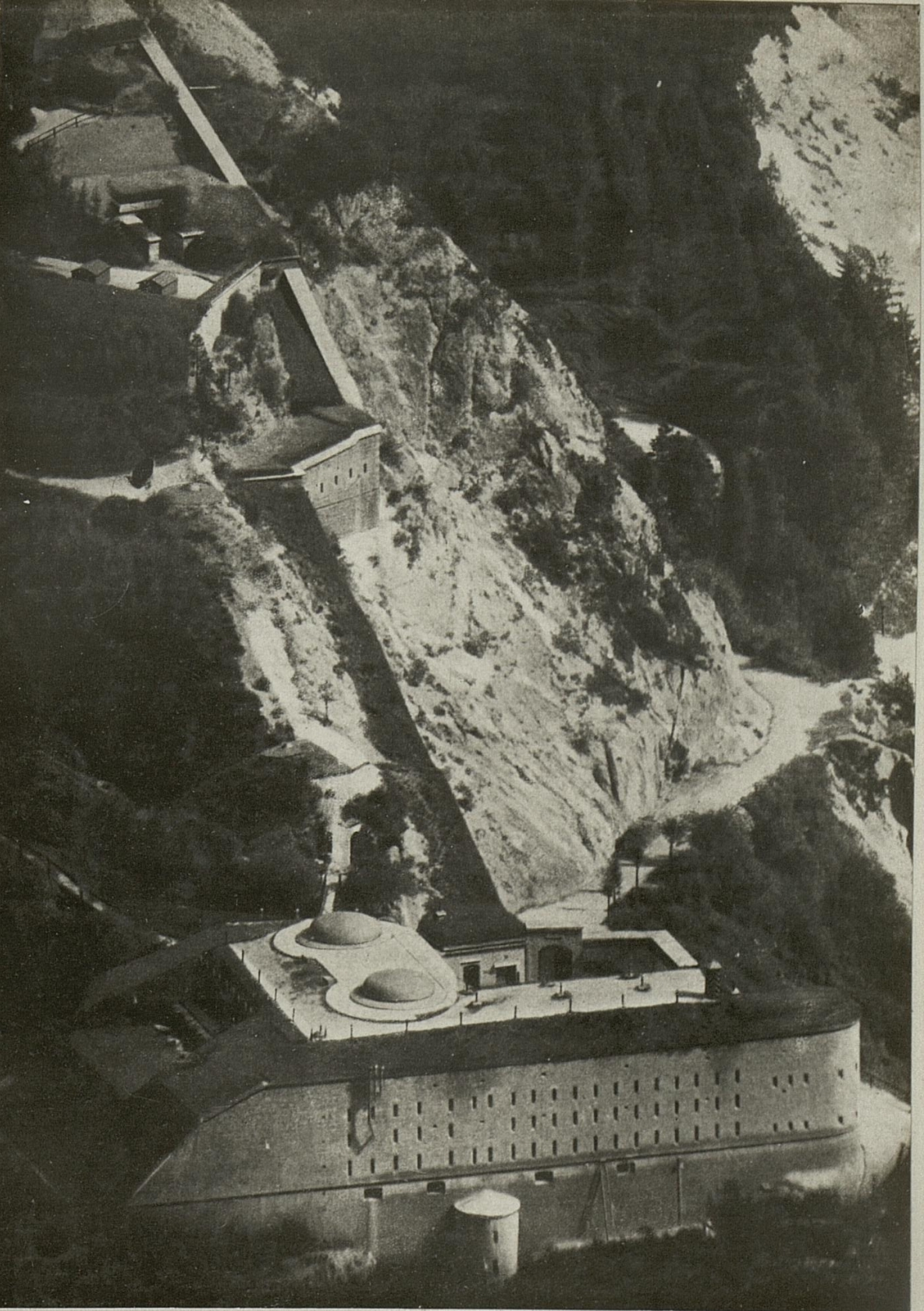
Battery "B" of Fort Hensel, higher up the mountain is the "Emergency" battery of 2 10 cm guns

Fort Hensel, Sept. 2026

== World War I ==
On June 12, 1915, Italian heavy artillery (30.5 cm and 21 cm) from the town of Dogna began shelling Fort Hensel. By August 4, 1915, over 4000 21 cm shells had been fired at Hensel. The commander of Hensel, Capt. Karl Ebner, died during the shelling when a 28 cm shell passed through all the floors and exploded in the first floor. Hensel was occupied by the Austrians until March 16, 1916, when the last of the guns were removed and the fort was abandoned.

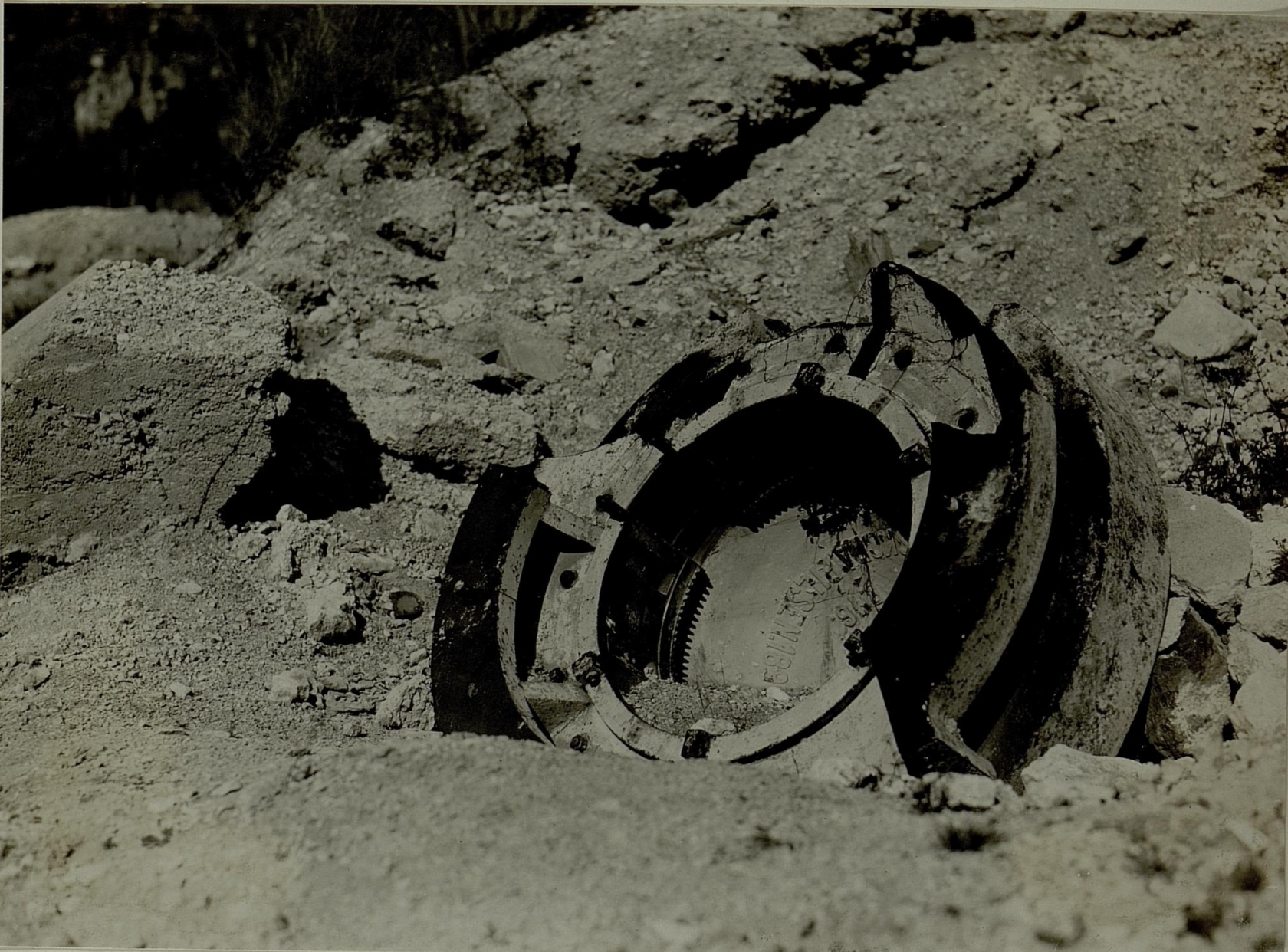
A smashed 12 cm turret lies upside down.

== Post-war ==
In 1930, the fort was reoccupied, this time by the Italians, as a position in the Alpine Line.
