= Mero intermediate works =

Austro-Hungarian fortification in Trentino, Italy

Coordinates: 46.2757°N 10.6262°E

- Interactive map of Mero intermediate works
- Location: Northern Italy

Fort Mero is an Austro-Hungarian fortification built in Northern Italy. Mero was built between 8 May 1911 and July 1913 and was the last fortification built in the Tonale group. Thus was born an intermediate work, between the large armored fort of Tonale works and the Blockhouse Pejo, with light armament but heavier armor. Mero had seven 8 mm Schwarloze machine guns for close defense. Mero had its own generator and was connected to the Tonale Pass and Fort Tonale by telephone. In 1916, the fort was the focus of Italian artillery, which reduced Mero to near the state that it is in.

== Post-war to today ==
In the 1930s, Mero was damaged by steel salvagers. Restoration was started in 2008, with help from the municipality of Vermiglio and the Autonomous Province of Trento. The vegetation near the fort was removed, and dangerous concrete blocks were removed so that visitors can enter a small part of the fort.
