= Monte Brione middle battery =

Austro-Hungarian fortification in Trentino, Italy

Coordinates: 45°52′56″N 10°52′22″E

Monte Brione Middle Battery is an Austro-Hungarian artillery fortification near the Northern Italian town of Riva Del Garda. Despite being called the Middle Battery, it is actually on the crest of Monte Brione, and is between Fort Garda to the south and Fort Saint Alexander to the north. The battery was built between 1898 and 1900 as part of the second round of new fortifications built in Italy. The mountain that Brione is built on is one of very few places where you can experience all three types of Austro-Hungarian fortifications. Brione was built with the purpose of supporting the aging fortifications in the Nago-Torbale area.

Brione's construction combined two materials that would usually have been used separately: stone and reinforced concrete. Brione's usefulness diminished with the decision to build the Adige-Vallarsa group of fortifications in 1909. Brione's armament was four 12 cm 1876 guns in casemates, in addition to two machine guns and numerous rifle slits.
