= Fort Moena =

Austro-Hungarian fort

Coordinates: 45°22′29″N 11°40′27″E

The Moena Roadblock (Italian: Forte Moena, German: Sperre Someda) is an Austro-Hungarian fortification built to guard the San Pellegrino Pass in what is now Northern Italy. Moena was built in 1899 at 1276m above sea level, and has 2 floors. Like most Austro-Hungarian forts built at that time, it was built mostly out of granite sourced locally. The fort was protected by a 12m thick belt of barbed wire and a minefield. In 1908, 2 armored observation turrets were installed in the fort. The fort’s wartime crew was 8 officers and 146 enlisted men. Moena’s shellfalls were reported by the Austro-Hungarian works at Busa Grande and Plavac. The fort was connected to Fort Dossaccio and the Moena Barracks by telephone lines.

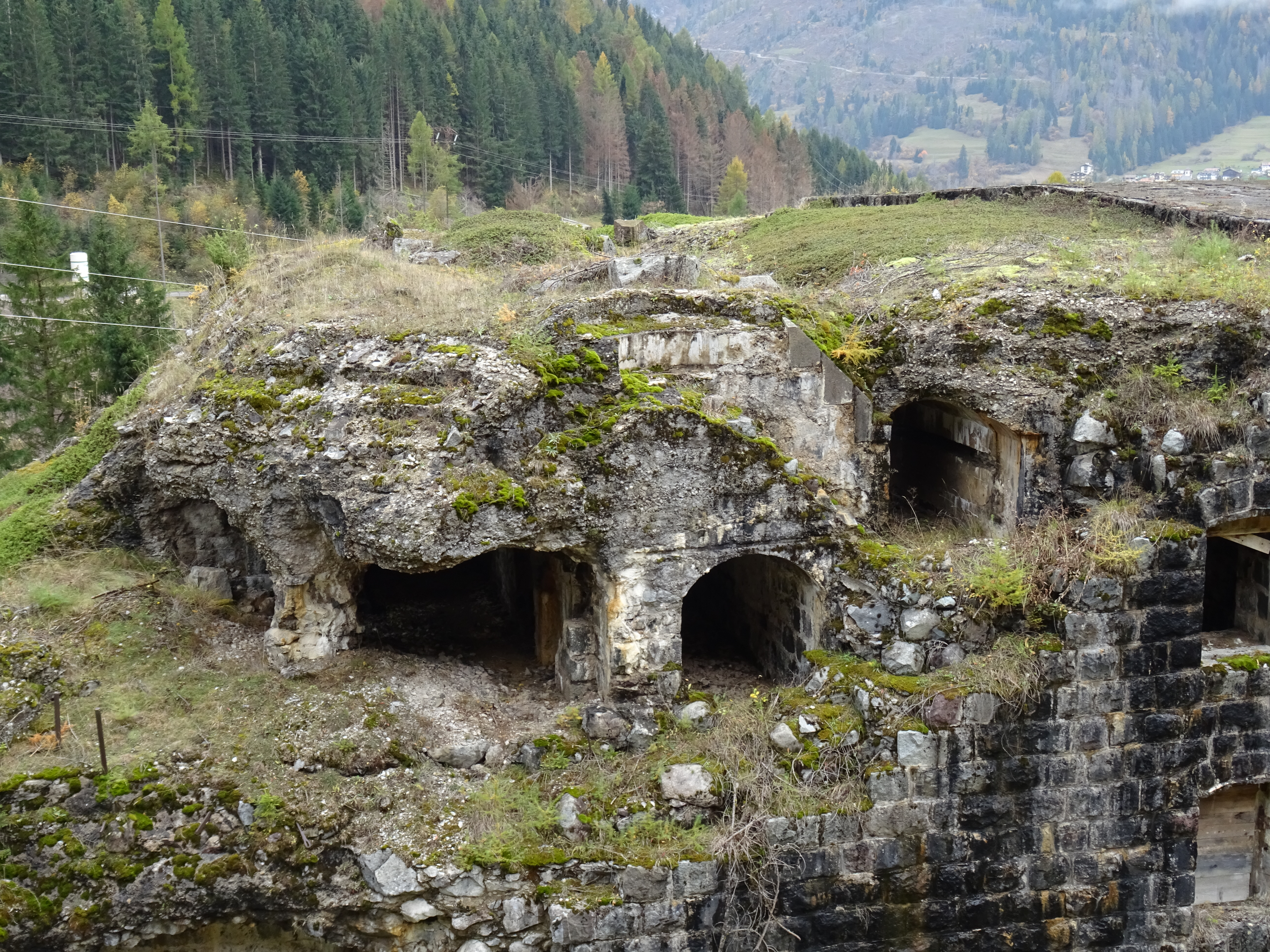
Part of the casemate battery, although it has been partially destroyed.

== Armament ==
The fort was armed with:

- 2 12cm M96 guns in armored swivel domes
- 2 15cm M99 guns in armored swivel domes
- 4 M93 machine guns
- 12 rifles and rifle slits

== World War I ==
In 1915, the fort was considered obsolete and its armament was removed to the San Pellegrino pass.

== Post-war ==
After World War I, the fort became property of the Italian state. It was decommissioned on December 8th, 1927, and was partially demolished in 1933. It is now privately owned by Mr. Giovanni Battista Felicetti of Someda, and is not open to the public.
