= San Rocco works =

Austro-Hungarian fortification in Trento, Italy

Coordinates: 46°02′04″N 11°08′27″E

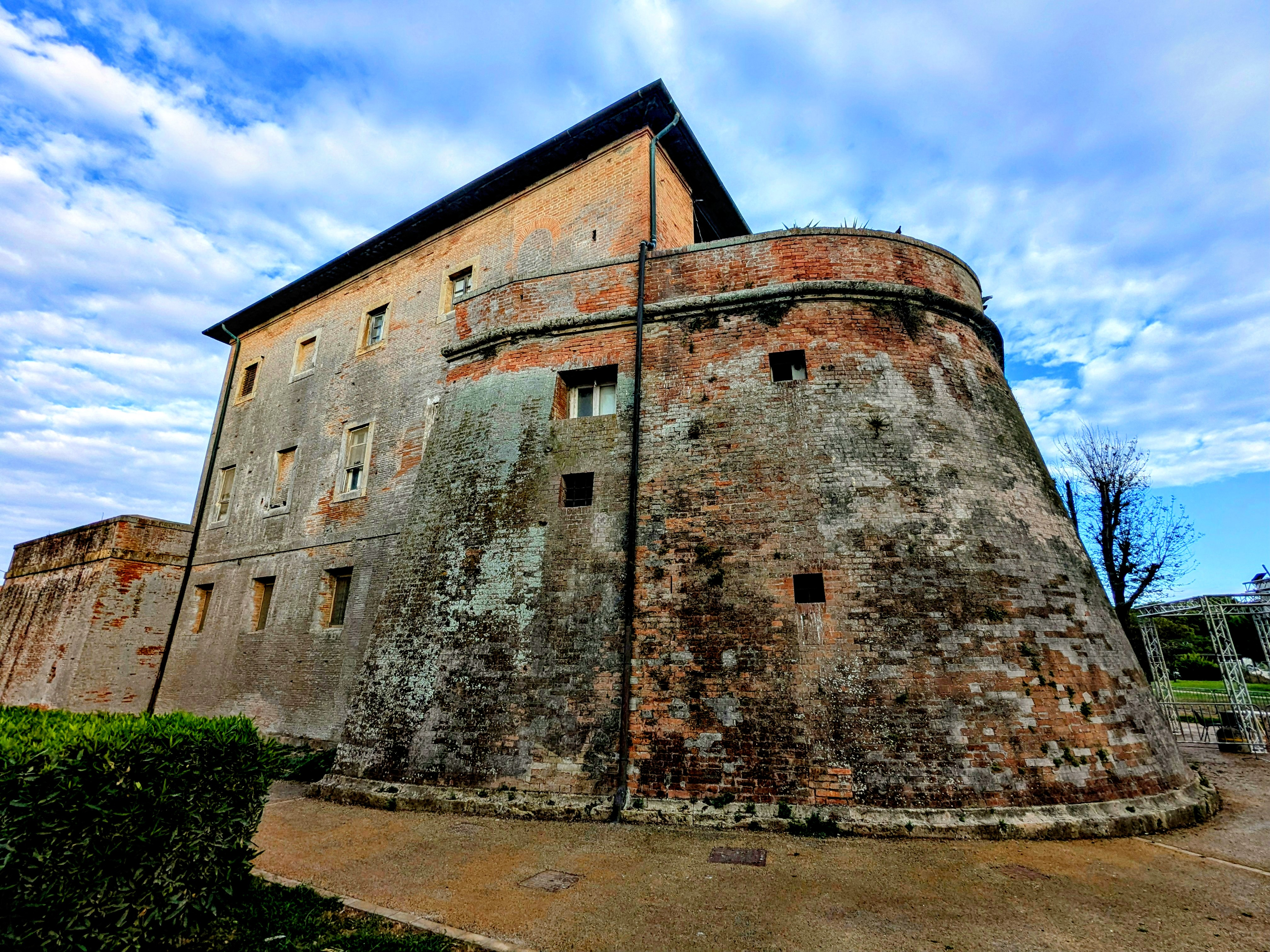
Fort San Rocco was built out of stone, and was thus obsolete by World War I. In the foreground would have been the moat.

Fort San Rocco is an Austro-Hungarian fort built between 1881 and 1883. The fort is the only fortification on the inner ring of defenses and was designed to defend Trento from an attack up the Adige Valley from the direction of Valsorda. The fort was armed with two 12 cm M80 fortress guns in unarmored swivel domes, manufactured by the German company Gruson, in addition to four 15 cm M61 heavy guns mounted in barbettes. The fort also had 17 rifle shotguns mounted for close defense. The standard complement for the fort was 9 officers and 122 NCOs and soldiers.

The fort is built on top of the 460-metre-high (1,510 ft) Dosso di San Rocco and is surrounded by a moat. In addition to those, the fort had several caponeries and was divided into two works, a high works and a low works, these were connected by an external walkway. The high works were laid out in a hexagonal shape, and are the main fort. The lower works housed barracks and artillery in barbettes. Since Rocco is constructed “behind” the batteries of Doss Fornas and Brusaferro, and it could support them in case of an attack.

== World War I ==
As with almost all forts built during this time, San Rocco was obsolete by the time the war started and would not have been able to withstand modern siege artillery. This is why in the summer of 1915 the fort was disarmed, its four 15cm guns moved to Monte Rosta. The two 12 cm gun, however, were moved to drum shafts on Monte Cornetto, before being mounted in housings on the northern slope of Monte Rosta.

== Post-war ==
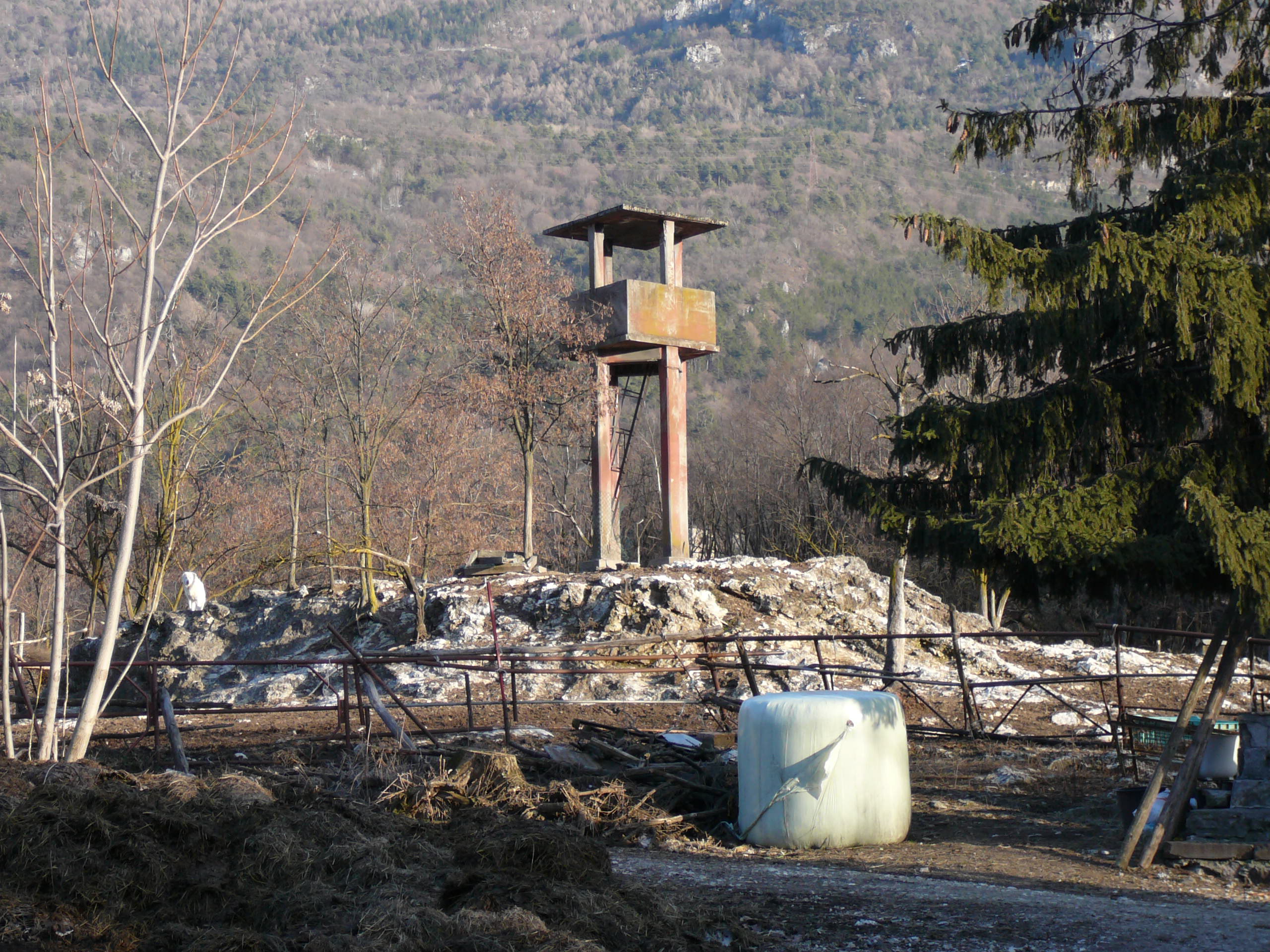
A guard tower reminds visitors that not long ago the fort was still in active duty.

After the war, when the fort was acquired by the Royal Italian Army, it was used as a powder dump until the 1980s, earning it the moniker "The Dust of San Rocco". The swivel domes were replaced by simple masonry domes. After the fort fulfilled its role as a powder magazine, it was given to a relative of someone who helped build the fort. He maintains the fort and cares for it today, in addition to the municipality.
