= Fort Danzolino =

Austro-Hungarian fortification in the Trentino

Coordinates: 45°57′51″N 10°39′58″E

Fort Danzolino (Italian: Forte Danzolino, German: Werk Danzolino) was an Austro-Hungarian fort built to protect the Chiesa Valley in Northern Italy. Work on the fort started in June 1860, and ended in May 1861. Danzolino was the 3rd (of 3) forts in the Lardaro group of fortifications. Danzolino was built due to the loss of the Lombardy region to Italy in 1859. In 1879, two field batteries called "Danzolino South" and "Danzolino North" were added. With the outbreak of war with Italy in May 1915, Danzolino was disarmed, and its guns were moved to field positions called "Prapur", which consisted of four 12 cm guns, and "Danzolino Ost", which consisted of two 9 cm field guns.

== Timeline ==
From November 1918 to 1938 and 1941–47, the fort was used as an armory by the Italians. In 1947 an explosion set off the stored munitions at Danzolino. Other sources state that the fort was blown up. The stone was then used to rebuild the Capuchin monastery of Condino.
