= San Nicolo Battery =

Austro-Hungarian fortification in Trentino, Italy

Coordinates: 45°52′37″N 10°51′25″E

The San Nicolo Battery (Italian: Batteria costiera San Nicolò, German: Strandbatterie San Nicolò) is an Austro-Hungarian artillery battery built on the slopes of Monte Brione in Northern Italy. Sources vary as to when Nicolo was built with some sources saying 1860–61 and 1870. S. Nicolo was built on the shores of Lake Garda for the purpose of keeping Italian infantry from landing on the relatively flat beaches near Riva Del Garda. San Nicolo was the only coastal artillery battery on a lake in Northern Italy. The Austrians called S. Nicolo “Strandbatterie” which means “Beach Battery” because it had the purpose of blocking the landing of troops. In addition to being a coastal battery, S. Nicolo had the job of barring the way between Riva Del Garda and Torbole to the east. Most of the guns were facing out across the lake, and Nicolo was later equipped with spotlights for illuminating the lake at night.

== Armament ==
- 4 15 cm guns
- 6 9 cm field guns mounted in minimum embrasures

Instead of mounting howitzers like many of the fort of the day, Nicolo had guns with flat trajectories because they were meant to fire across the lake. The crew was 4 Officers and 165 enlisted men.
