= Landro Works =

Austro-Hungarian fortification in Eastern Tyrol

Coordinates: 46.6447°N 12.2334°E

The Landro Roadblock, technically the Landro Works, is an Austro-Hungarian fortification built in Eastern Tyrol (Now part of Northern Italy). Due to the hilly construction site, the roadblock had to be built in 2 parts, the mortar battery, and the higher cannon battery. Landro was the largest fortification in Subrayon V of the Austro-Hungarian fortifications on the Italian border. The roadblock was crewed by 6 officers and 184 enlisted men.

During World War I, the roadblock was the seat of command for Subrayon V. The mortar battery was constructed between 1884-91, and the cannon battery was built between 1887-94. Both were connected by an underground postern. Landro was one of the first fortifications built by Austria-Hungary that used concrete and steel in the construction. The rapid advancement of artillery meant that in a few years, the roadblock was obsolete. Several replacement structures were planned but never implemented.

The outbreak of war in August 1914 led to Landro being put on alert, and in April 1915, before the Italians declared war, the guns were removed to field positions on Monte Sief, next to Col di Lana, and the Strudelalpe Valley, overlooking the Landro Valley.

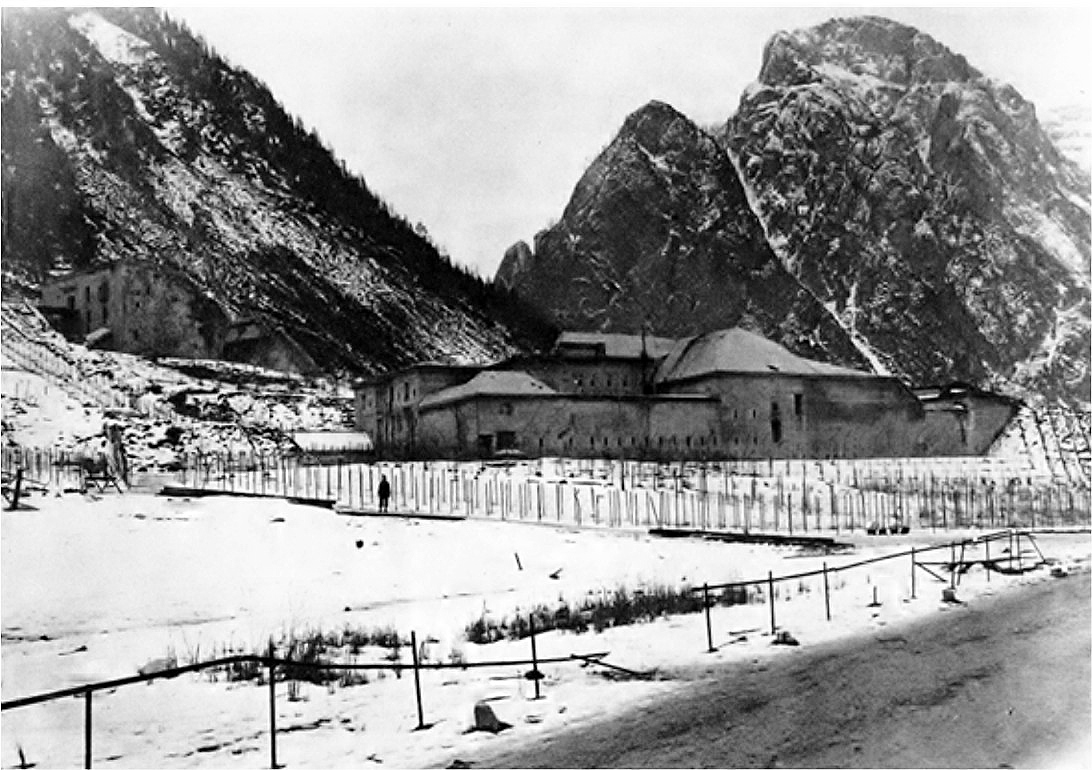
Fort Landro as seen from the east. This photo was taken just after the fort was readied for war, probably the winter of 1914-15.

== Armament ==
- 3 12cm M80 guns
- 3 10cm M80 guns (Originally planned to be 15cm guns)
- 6 M7 and M93 8mm machine guns

== World War I ==
The roadblock was lightly shelled by Italian heavy guns on July 5th, 1915. The results were abysmal, with only 4 hits on the roadblock itself. For the rest of the war it was used as a barracks for infantry stationed on the second line of defense.

== Post-war ==
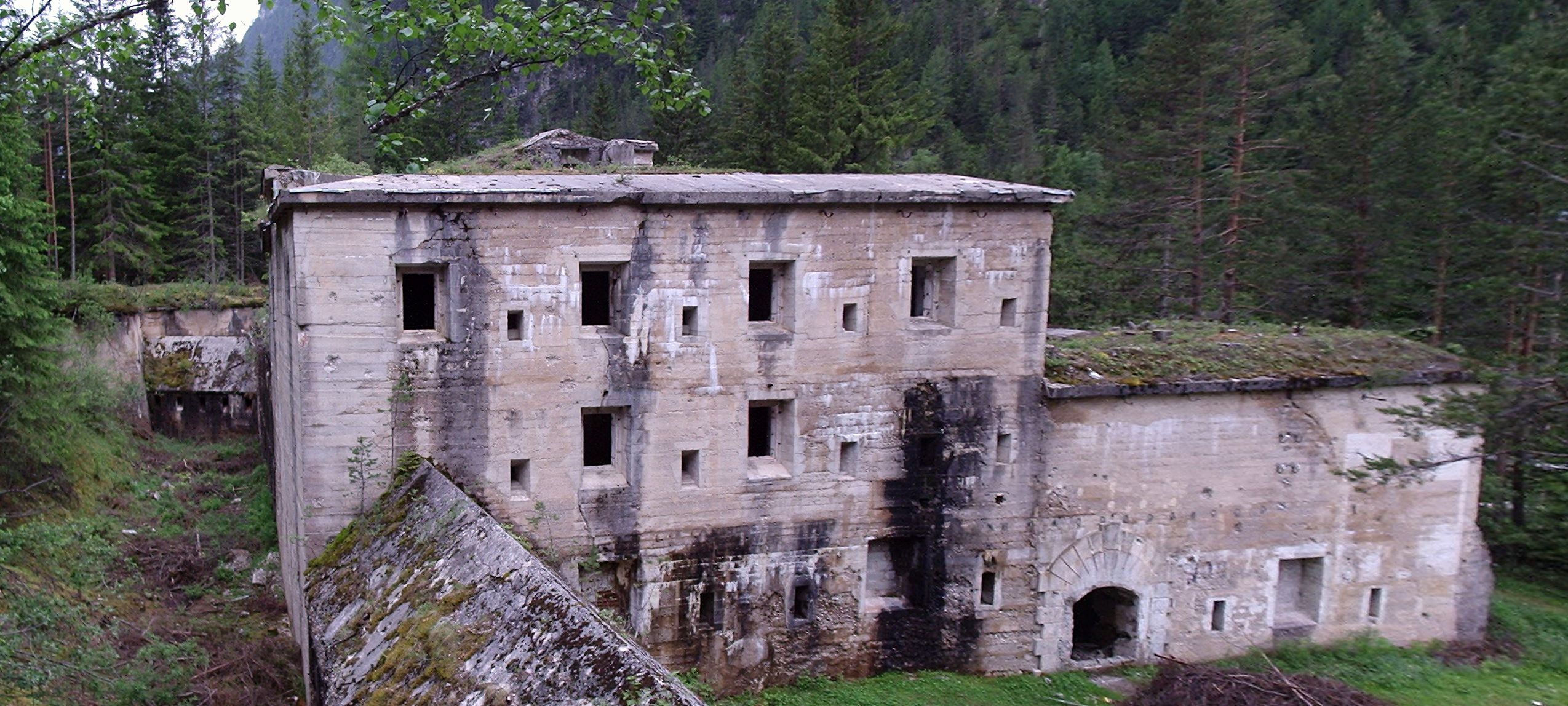
Fort Landro today, the fort is forbidden to enter because it is still part of the Italian Army.

The roadblock was partially demolished after the war, but in 1936 was identified as a possible point for Anti-German resistance. The Italian Army still owns the fort, however the public is forbidden to enter.
