= Fort Garda =

Austro-Hungarian fortification in Trentino, Italy

Coordinates: 45°52′57″N 10°52′21″E

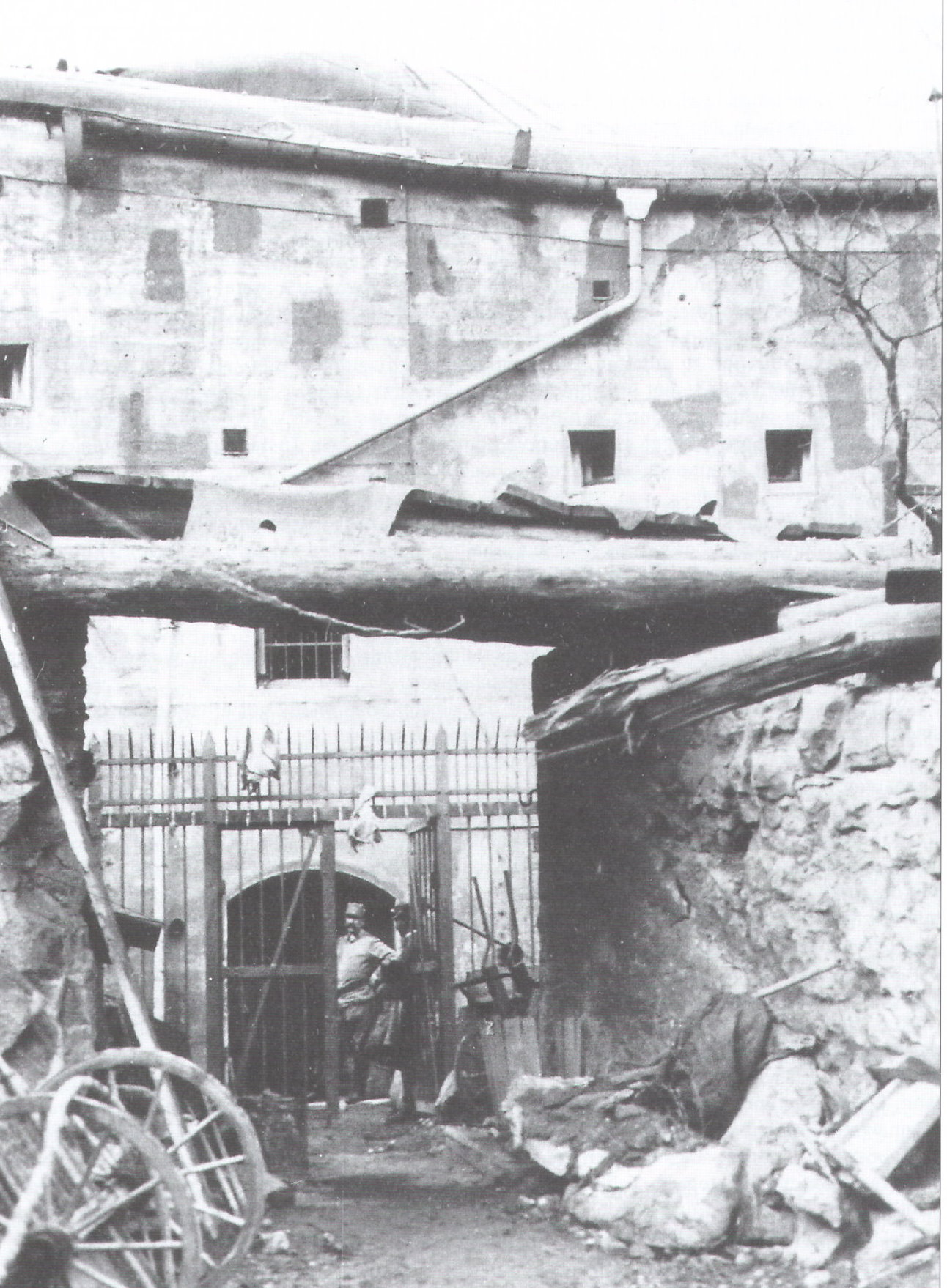
Entrance to the fort in 1915

Fort Garda is an Austro-Hungarian fortification built near the northern Italian town of Riva del Garda. It was constructed between 1907 and 1909 and was one of the last fortifications built in the area before the war with Italy began in May 1915. The fort was built on the shores of Lake Garda and was tasked with defending the northern shore of the lake, both across land and water. Despite being three floors tall, the fort was built low to the ground to blend in with the local terrain. Although a fixed fortification, it retained offensive capability: its guns could fire in any direction at ranges of up to 8.5 km.

== Armament ==
The fort's armament consisted of:

- Four 10 cm howitzers in rotating armoured domes with 360-degree traverse
- Two M05 8 cm quick-firing guns
- Three 8 mm machine guns
- One retractable searchlight
- One armoured observation dome

A battery of 30 cm mortars was positioned just above the main fort.

== After World War I ==
The fort is owned by the municipality of Riva del Garda and has been the subject of a restoration project to open it to visitors. It was opened to the public on 2 July 2017.
