= Forte Belvedere Gschwent =

Fortress in Trentino, Italy

- Lavarone, Trentino, Italy
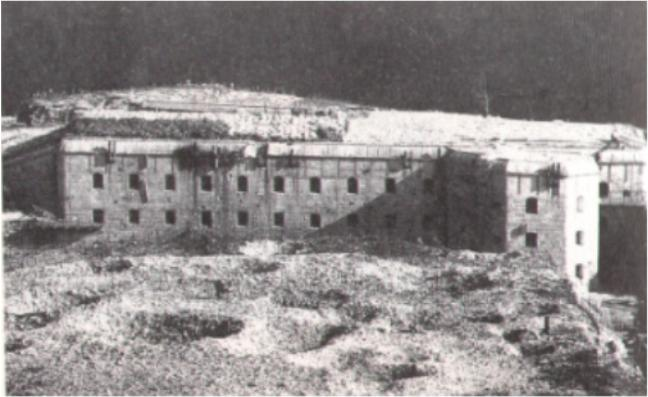

Location
- Coordinates: 45°55′20.19″N 11°17′14.05″E

Site history
- Built: 1908–1912
- Built by: Rudolf Schneider

The Austro-Hungarian fortress of Lavarone (in Trentino), better known as Forte Belvedere Gschwent, (German: Werk Gschwent) stands at an altitude of 1177 metres south of the Oseli subdivision on a rocky spur that extends towards the Valdastico and the Rio Torto valley, dominating its headlands. The fort belongs to the large system of Austro-Hungarian fortifications on the Italian border.

== Description ==
=== Construction and architecture ===
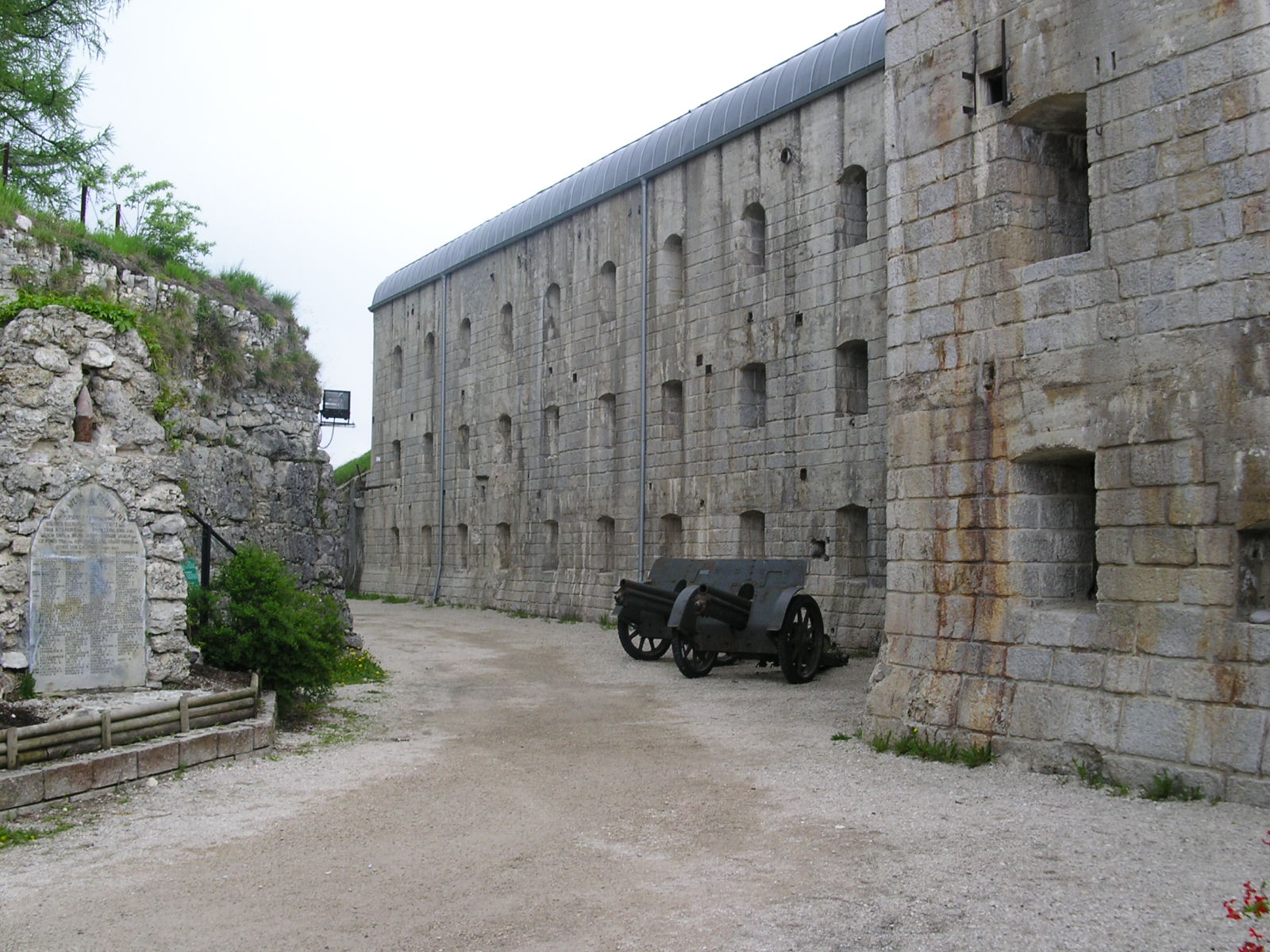
View of the fort in 2006

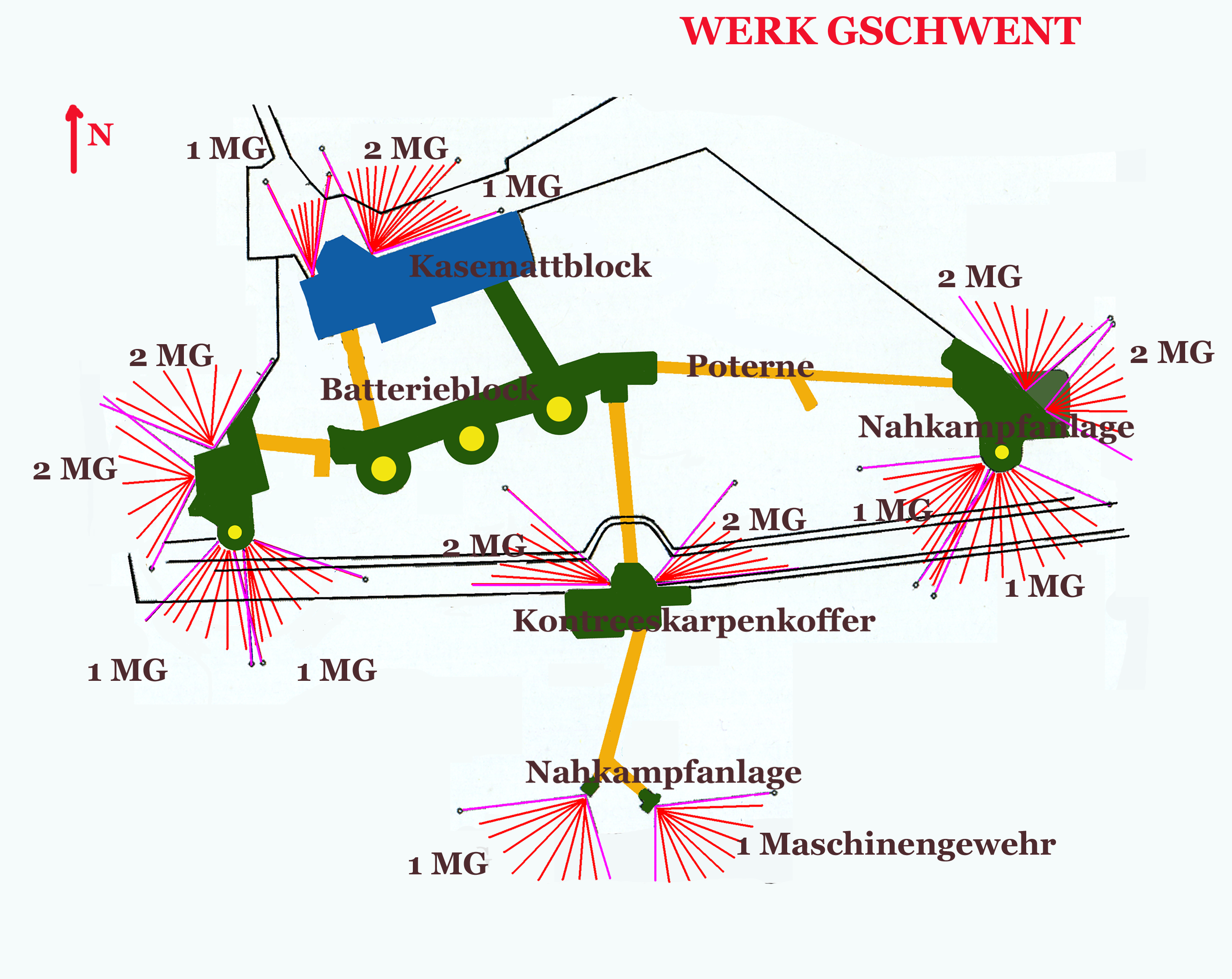
Plan of the Belvedere Fort

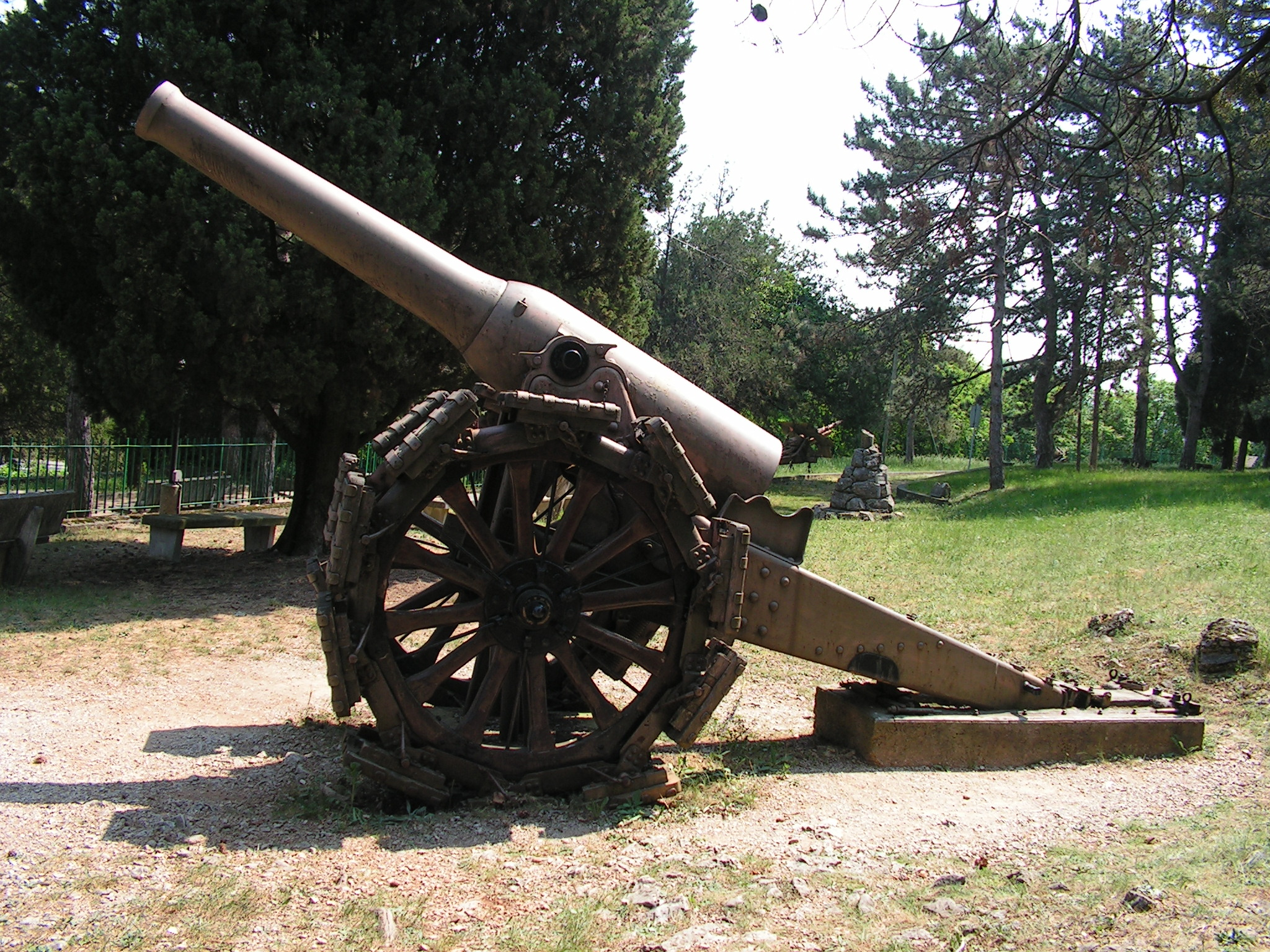
149 mm gun of the Italian artillery

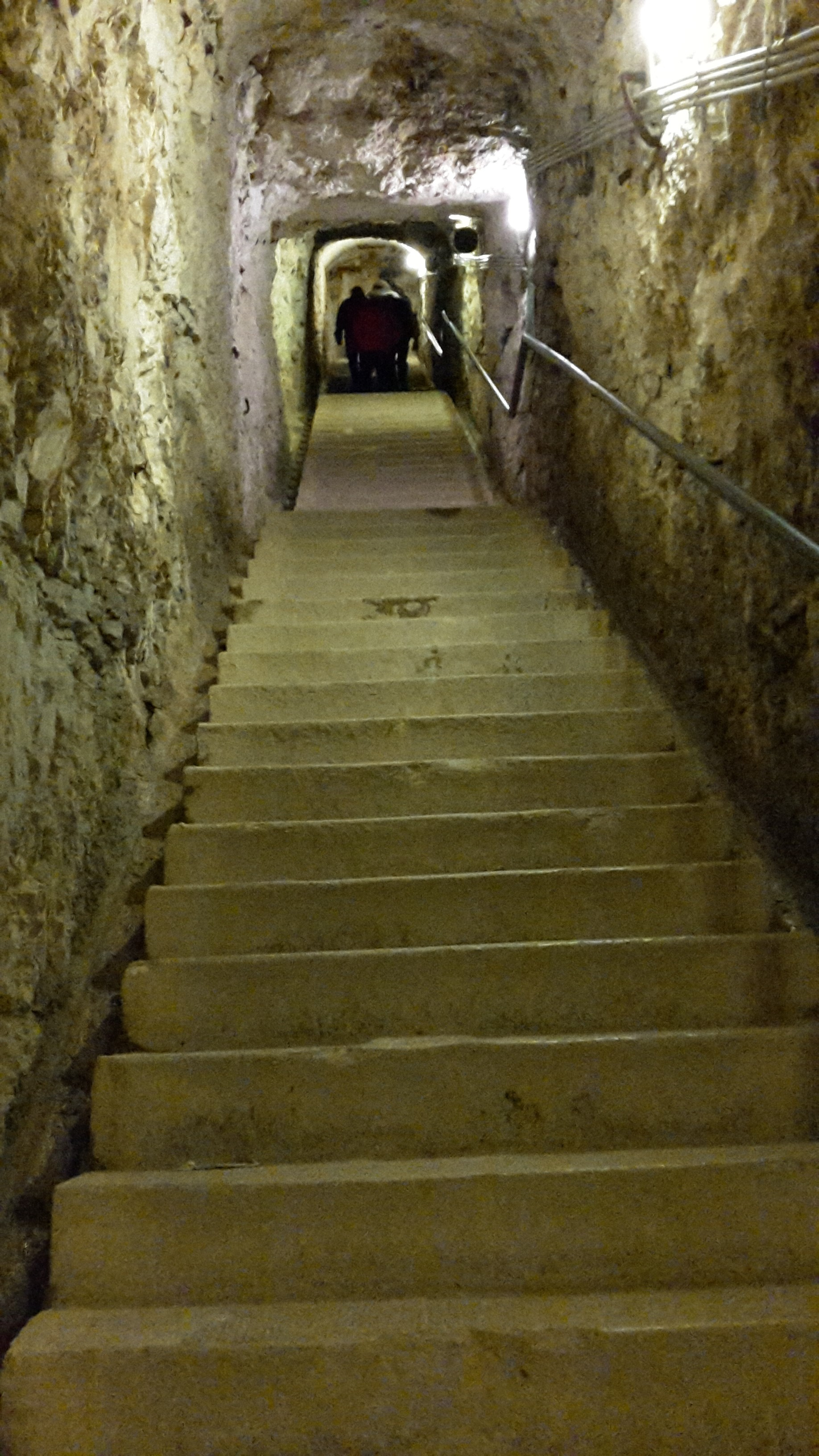
Internal staircase

The designer was the captain of the general staff of the engineers, Rudolf Schneider, who built it starting in 1908 under the direction of the military engineers of Trento and following the indications of the Imperial and Royal Ministry of War in Vienna. A firm from Vienna was commissioned to carry out the work, also using local labour.

Unlike most fortresses of the period that were still built according to traditional models and schemes, Rudolf Schneider adopted new and in some respects experimental solutions in its construction. It is immediately noticeable that the fort is not gathered in a single architectural complex, but is rather spread out, with several blockhouses for close combat placed far from each other, in the middle of which the battery block for long-distance combat was placed. Behind this is the body of the casemates with the troop accommodation (about 220 soldiers) and the services. Everything is connected by means of corridors and galleries in the limestone rock. The main body of the fort was arranged on three levels and is the largest of the forts built by the Austro-Hungarian military engineers in Trentino. It was a hinge point between the surrounding forts: Vezzena (Fort Lusern, Fort Verle, and Fort Vezzena) and Folgaria (Fort Serrada, Fort Sommo Alto, and Fort Sebastiano). The entire fort is approximately 200 metres long and 100 metres wide.

The steep rock cliffs on three sides of the Valdastico gave Forte Belvedere a natural protection from enemy infantry attacks. Along the front line a deep ditch had been dug with a double strip of wire fences, which could only be defeated by a machine gun attack. On the flanks and on the ravine sides wire fences 6 to 12 meters high were also present, which could also only be defeated by a machine gun attack. Forte Belvedere could therefore be considered practically impregnable.

Completed on May 18, 1912, Forte Belvedere was built and tested to withstand even the heaviest bombardments and was a modern and rational work where concrete and iron were expertly blended with rock. It consisted of a casemate block with accommodation for the garrison, services and food and ammunition depots inside, a battery block in an advanced position connected to the first through two tunnels and finally a third block, consisting of three machine gun emplacements reachable from underground corridors dug into the mountain. The casemate block is arranged on 3 floors and covered in chiselled limestone; partly dug into the rock, it is characterised by the polygonal protrusion of the façade. The covering of the casemate block is protected from water with a layer of tar and zinc sheets, while the humidity of the structure partly dug into the rock was limited by gutters, pipes and drain channels. The fort, connected to the Mount Rust observation post, was equipped with three 10 cm howitzers in revolving steel domes, two observation posts and about twenty machine guns for close-in defense. Two searchlights per casemate served for night surveillance.

For communication with the outside, the fort was connected with a telephone switchboard to the Artillery Group Command of Monterovere and to the Lavarone-Chiesa telephone station. On the second floor of the throat box there is an optical station for connections with the Luserna fort, via the Oberwiesen outpost, the Cherle fort and the Mount Rust observatory.

The construction of the fort had been budgeted for an expense of one and a half million Austrian crowns, a figure that reached approximately 2,000,000 when the work was completed. To this had to be added the cost of the armament, which can be estimated at 300,000 crowns.

Forte Belvedere, like all the most modern Austrian fortifications, was a complex designed to be completely autonomous, even in the event of a prolonged siege. It was therefore equipped with all the equipment and logistical services to make it self-sufficient for a period of one hundred days, even if repeated bombings prevented a regular supply of food and ammunition. It was connected to two cisterns fed by a nearby spring and electricity was provided by a motor generator and batteries.

In particular:

- blockhouse no. 2 is the one from the howitzer battery, taking the long tunnel on the right that leads to the front ditch and then to the counterscarp, created specifically for the defense of the front ditch. This structure was composed of two floors: on the ground floor the counterscarp hood with 4 machine guns behind 2 bomb-proof armored shields and two 8mm mod. 07 machine guns (M.G.Sch. 13 and 14), a room for the troops (with a slit for a 21 cm electric searchlight to illuminate the right side of the ditch), a rifle room (also this one with a slit for a searchlight to illuminate the other side of the ditch) and a toilet, while on the first floor there was a room for the troops and a room for the armed picket with illuminating rocket launchers.
- blockhouse no. 3, the most exposed, has a tunnel that leads to the counterscarp and forks at the end into two caves overlooking the Valdastico. It constitutes the most advanced part of the fort and allowed to repel any assaults by the Italian troops. The two caves were closed with a steel plate with slits for machine guns. It seems that in the left cave an 8 cm caliber cannon was installed to help the advance of the Strafexpedition.
- the moat was dug completely into the rock, 8 meters wide and 8 to 10 meters deep; it was supposed to provide security in case of attacks by the enemy, even if given the position of the fort, they were almost excluded. The moat was covered with a thick wire fence.

After the outbreak of the First World War, the fort suffered heavy bombardment by Italian artillery; the fort ceased its strategic importance after the Strafexpedition of May 1916 when the front moved forward to the Asiago plateau.

Unlike other nearby fortresses, the fort was not damaged in the 1930s by the salvagers and therefore managed not to be demolished. First of all, the state became the owner and immediately rented it to the municipality of Lavarone. During the fascist period, many forts were looted or demolished, while the Belvedere fort was saved thanks to the intervention of King Vittorio Emanuele III. However, in the 1940s, the metal domes of the fort and part of the metal covering of the roof were removed. After the Second World War, the fort returned to the hands of the region and in 1966 to a private individual who created a museum. Finally, in 2002, the municipality, which had become the owner of the fort, began its restoration.

=== Armament ===
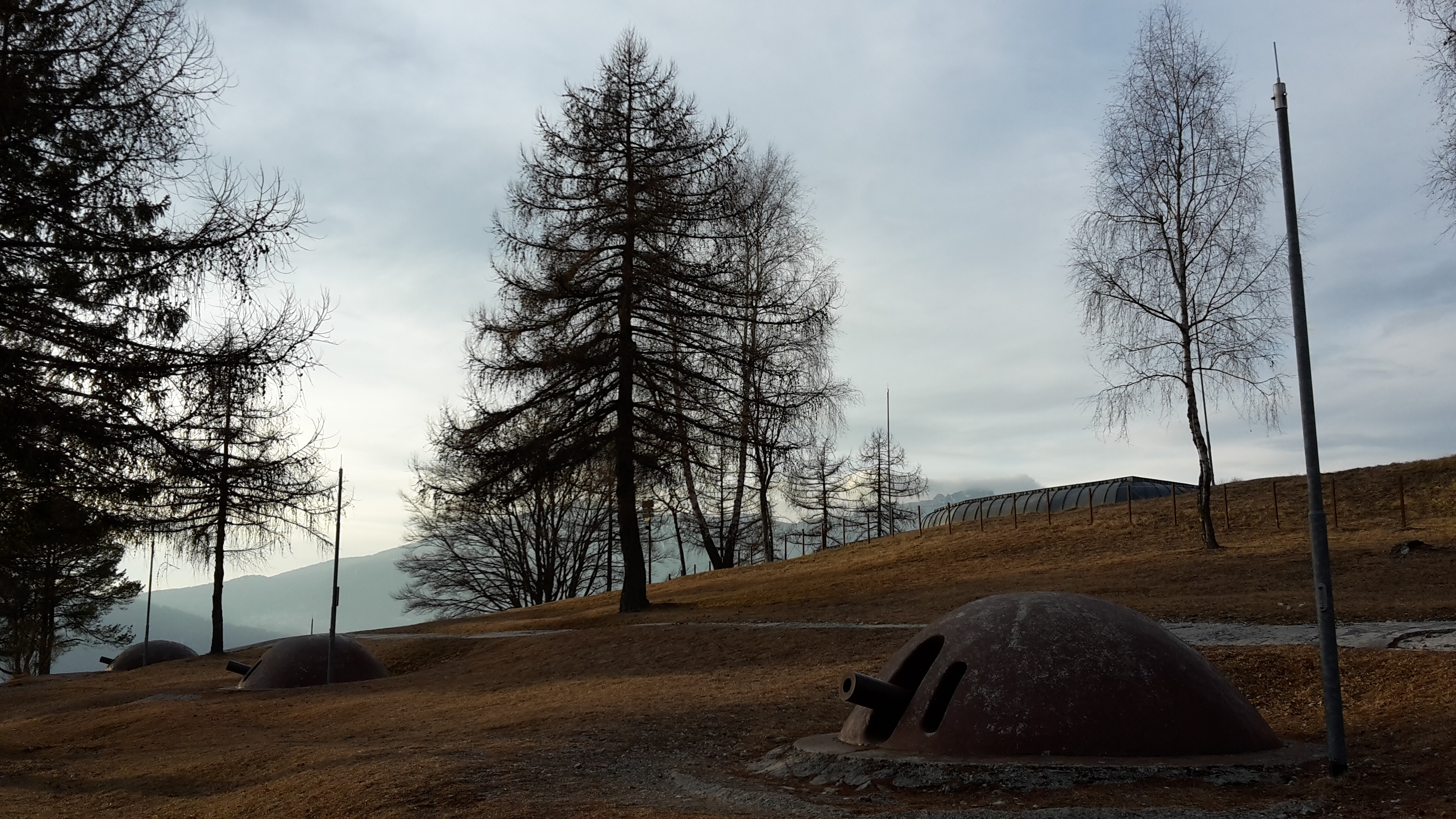
The three armored domes

The main armament of the Belvedere fort consisted of a battery of three 10 cm caliber howitzers, protected by 250 mm thick revolving armored steel domes. Although the 10 cm gun was rather small, it was preferred to larger calibers for various practical reasons and also in consideration of the fact that the Austrian forts had a predominantly defensive function. A relatively small caliber, in fact, allowed for the stacking of a considerable reserve of ammunition and enjoyed relative ease of movement. Furthermore, a larger caliber would have led to a loss of solidity of the dome, which, to be stable, would have had to be completely redesigned and manufactured in larger dimensions. To withstand heavy bombardment, the fort was covered with 2.5-meter-thick concrete into which three layers of 40-cm beams were inserted.

Unlike the other fortifications on the plateau, Fort Gschwent did not have any fighting positions armed with cannons. Instead, it was preferred to equip the fortress with a significant number of 8 mm Schwarzlose Mod. 07 machine gun positions, equally efficient weapons, but much less expensive.

=== The Great War museum ===
Today, Forte Belvedere Gschwent is a museum of the fort's history and of the First World War (1914–1918). The museum is spread over three floors of the main barracks:

- on the ground floor, the history of Forte Belvedere and the fortified front of the Plateau of di Folgaria, Lavarone and Vezzena are explained;
- on the first floor, life inside the fort and the war on the Alpine front are discussed;
- on the second floor, the more general themes of the conflict are addressed, paying particular attention to life in the trenches and the human condition of the soldiers at the front.

Inside there are historical finds and multimedia installations that illustrate the history of the fort, its garrison and the military events that affected the Plateaus.

The fortress museum is open to visitors from April 1 to November 1, closed on Mondays (except July and August).

The museum is part of the Trentino Grande Guerra network.

== World war I ==
On May 23, 1915, the Kingdom of Italy declared war on Austria-Hungary.

=== The garrison ===
On the day of the declaration of war, the official garrison of the fort was composed of: 1 commander, 2 artillery officers, 1 infantry officer, 1 medical officer, 130 non-commissioned officers and gunners, 50 Landesschützen; 8 telephone operators, 5 medical workers, 5 sappers, 5 ordinances (order runners) and 5 orderlies.

=== Bombings ===
Although never directly assaulted by Italian infantry, throughout the first year of the war Forte Belvedere was subjected to very intense bombings. The enemy artillery fire caused considerable damage to the structures on several occasions and also caused victims among the garrison, but never reached the intensity reached by the bombings against Fort Lusern and Post Vezzena.

On May 23, 1915, at 6:00 pm, with the declaration of war by Italy on Austria-Hungary, hostilities began. At 5:00 a.m. the following day the first cannon shots were fired against Forte Belvedere. In addition to the cannons of the Italian forts Forte Verena and Forte Campolongo, the Italian artillery was located at Porta Manazzo, near Monte Campomolon, at the Vena pass and on Mount Toraro.

On the Austrian side, the only artillery in the field in the first days of the war consisted of the batteries of the belt of forts, often too weak. Without the possibility of countering the Italian action, only the great resistance of the forts to the bombardments guaranteed the holding of the line. Only later would the 30.5 cm mortar placed on the Costalta hill and the other large caliber artillery come into action.

== The post-war period ==
At the end of the conflict, Forte Belvedere, like the other forts of the Plateaus, became property of the Italian state. In the 1920s, a line of seven fortresses in a state of partial efficiency stood there, among the pastures and woods of these mountains, in memory of a war still too close to be forgotten.

About a decade later, however, a series of events would irremediably mark the history of these fortifications. Those that are often remembered as "the years of recovery" began. In those years, the fascist government had embarked on the path of colonial politics and autarky, isolating Italy on the international level. As an immediate consequence, problems arose in the supply of those raw materials essential to the national industry. To contain at least a small part of the serious crisis in supplies to the steel industry, the demolition of the armored works of the First World War was also considered. Already in the mid-1930s, many of the Altopiani Forts were mined to recover the iron they contained. These buildings, a marvel of Austrian military technology, were thus reduced to shapeless piles of rubble. Forte Belvedere, unlike the others, was saved from demolition by the intervention of King Vittorio Emanuele III, who wanted at least one fort to remain as a permanent testimony of the great war for future generations.

With great foresight, in the 1960s the Osele family purchased the fort to exploit its tourist value, equipping it with a lighting system and information boards for the various rooms and making it visitable as a museum in itself.

In 1997, the fort, one of the largest and best preserved, was purchased by the municipality of Lavarone which, with the financial support of the government of the autonomous province of Trento, immediately launched and carried out a series of restoration and enhancement interventions on the site, which led to the construction of the modern museum.

== Bibliography ==
- Puecher, Mario (2006). Forte Belvedere Gschwent: guida all'architettura, alla tecnica e alla storia della fortezza austro-ungarica di Lavarone [Guide to the architecture, construction technique and history of the Austro-Hungarian fortress of Lavarone] (in Italian). Lavarone: Fondazione Belvedere Gschwent. ISBN 978-88-89898-14-7.
- Malatesta, Leonardo (2015). Per Trento basto io! La storia costruttiva e bellica del Forte Belvedere di Lavarone, un protagonista della Prima guerra mondiale [For Trento I am enough! History of the construction and wartime engagement of the Forte Belvedere di Lavarone, a protagonist of the First World War] (in Italian). Lavarone: Fondazione Belvedere Gschwent.
- Fontana, Nicola (2016). La regione fortezza. Il sistema fortificato del Tirolo: pianificazione, cantieri e militarizzazione del territorio da Francesco I alla Grande Guerra [The fortress region. The system of fortifications of the Tyrol: planning, sites and militarization of the territory from Francis I to the Great War] (in Italian). Rovereto: Museo storico italiano della guerra.
- Rosner, Wilibald Richard (2016). Fortificazione e operazione. Lo sbarramento degli Altipiani di Folgaria, Lavarone e Luserna [Fortification and operation. The barricading of the highlands of Folgaria, Lavarone and Lucern] (in Italian). Trento: Centro documentazione Luserna. ISBN 978-88-6876-124-0.
