= Fort Verle =

Austro-Hungarian fortification in the Trentino, Italy.

Coordinates: 45°57′53″N 11°19′57″E

Fort Verle (Italian: Forte Verle, German: Werk Verle) is one of seven forts built in the Lavarone-Folgaria group, a series of forts located near the municipalities of Lavarone and Folgaria in Northern Italy. These were a group of forts commissioned and built by the Austro-Hungarian military between 1880 and 1915. Like most forts in the Lavarone-Folgaria group, Verle was a relatively new fort and was one of the most up to date in the various fortifications surrounding Trento. Construction began on Oct. 22nd, 1908, and lasted until March 30, 1913. The fort was built at an altitude of 1508 m (5,000 ft), and was in a very exposed position. It was also 7 km from the Italian Forte Verena, but because Verena is 500m higher, Verle’s tower howitzers (T.H) couldn't hit the fort.

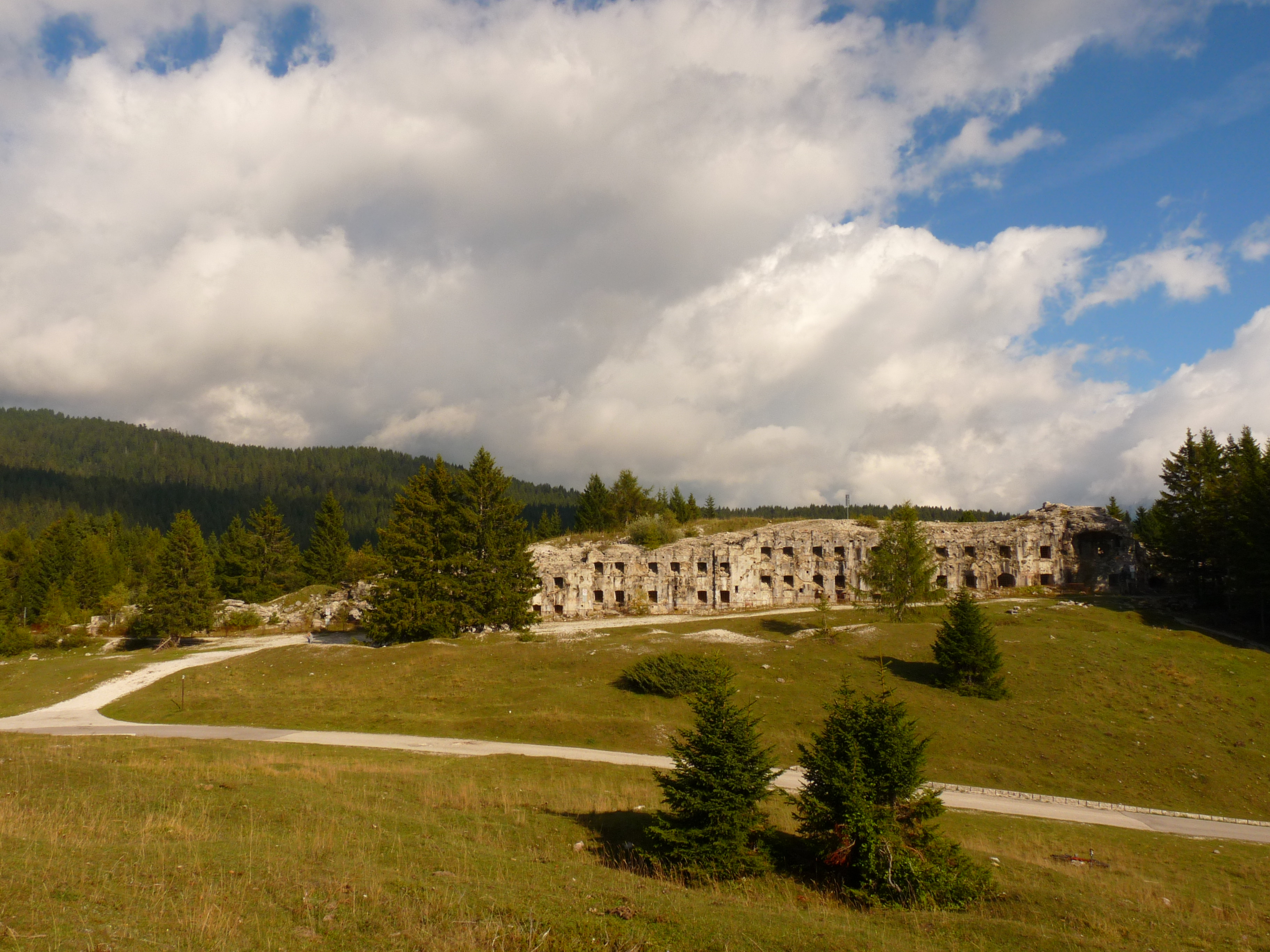
Fort Verle seen facing the Trentino-Veneto border today, the border runs along the same path as the Italian-Austro-Hungarian border.

The neighboring “Fort Vezzena” (for it wasn't really a fort, it was meant to observe) was also used as an observation post for Verle. The fort was built as what was called a “Fort of Unity” which meant that artillery and infantry were incorporated into one structure. The fort was built in an irregular square shape, with a trench going around only 2 of the walls.

== Armament ==
- 4 10 cm T.H M09 howitzers placed in 25 cm thick rotating armored domes
- 2 8 cm guns as a flanking battery facing towards Fort Lusern
- 4 6 cm cannons in casemates protecting the trenches
- 15 M.07/12 Schwarzlose machine guns, these were emplaced in:
  - 4 armored casemates with 2 guns each
  - 3 armored domes with 2 guns each
  - 1 in a rotating observation turret with 1 gun

== Construction ==
The fort was built out of solid concrete and was only occasionally reinforced by steel. The ceiling was 2.15m thick consisting of compacted concrete. The concrete ceilings were mounted on steel I-Beams, so that the force of a blast would be transferred to the side walls. Fort Verle was built partially underground, although the most vital parts of the fort didn't enjoy the protection of the natural rock. This made the fort vulnerable to artillery because there was not sufficient amounts of earth above to protect the vitals of the fort. Unlike the earlier works of Forte Belvedere Gschwent and Fort Serrada, the guns were located farther apart, and thus Verle’s armament couldn't be knocked out with a few well-placed shots. The battery block is located on the South-East side of the fort, near the curve in the outbound walls between turrets II and III. The distance between guns III and IV is greater than the distance between guns II and III, since an armored dome with machine guns is located in-between. Inside the battery block there were: 3 ammunition rooms, 2 standby rooms for the crews, a signal station for communicating with Fort Vezzena, a 25 cm spotlight, a toilet, and an emergency exit. The howitzers in this block were mounted on negative depressors (so that the guns can aim at a negative elevation level) so that they could fire at an angle of -15 degrees. The casemate block consisted of 3 floors, with storage rooms, a cistern and a tomb for the dead. The ground floor of the fort consisted of: an engine room with an emergency generator, 2 standby rooms, a workshop, kitchen, an 8 bed infirmary with a doctors office, and guard room next to the entrance. The upper floor consisted of: 4 standby rooms, 2 officer’s barracks, the commander’s room, 1 ammo magazine, and a telephone room. After the second shelling in Sept. 1915, this floor was abandoned and filled with 1m of concrete, making the ground floor a lot more safe.

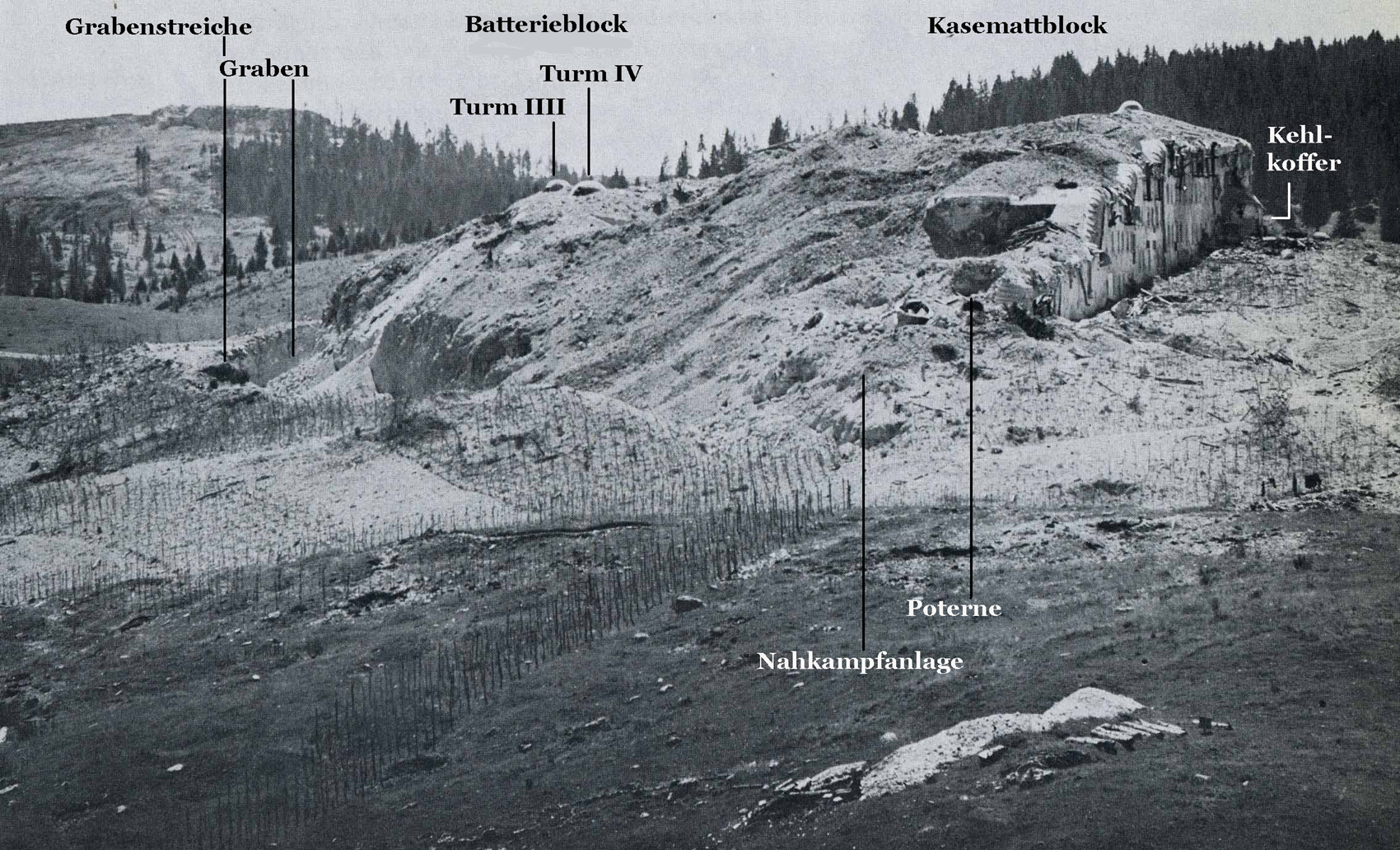
Turm: turret, Nahkampfanlage: Close Combat Facility, Kasematt: Casemate,

Protruding Caponier: this consisted of: 1 staircase leading to the postern, 1 standby room, 2 stands for 21 cm spotlights, 1 armored casemate sporting 2 machine guns, and 2 gun rooms for 2 6 cm field guns each. In addition to this caponier there was also an outlying facility, called a melee facility. This consisted of: an armored spotlight stand, 2 armored domes for 2 machine guns each, 1 ammo room, and a defensible standby room. During the course of the shelling during World War I, the facility was completely destroyed, with both its turrets lying in the surrounding trenches.

== World War I ==
The wartime complement of the fort was 5 officers, and 233 enlisted men. The artillery crew came from the 3rd company of the 6th Artillery Battalion of k.u.k. State Shooter Regiment No.I “Trento”. During World War I, Verle was severely shelled up until the Battle of Asiago. The first shot in the war between Austria-Hungary and Italy was fired at Verle by the Italian Forte Verena at 4am on May 24, 1915, according to Italian sources. By the end of May 1915, the Italians had brought up 21 cm, and 28 cm guns, in addition to 30.5 cm naval mortars.

=== Damage from the first shelling of 1915 ===
- May 26: pre-armor of gun tower No.II holed by 28 cm shell, 2 killed and 2 wounded
- May 27: a 28 cm shell hits howitzer dome No.IV, 4 injured.
- May 28: 28 cm shell hits and immobilises turret No.I.
- May 31: shell penetrates into the battery block near tower of howitzer dome No.IV.
- June 8: a shell hits the armored spotlight stand in the melee facility
- June 17: 2 holes punched in the corridor of the casemate block

=== The Giebermann Affair ===
After a 28 cm shell penetrated the pre-armor of turret No.II during the first day of shelling, the commander, Oberleutnant Alfred Giebermann, wrote to his commander Major Jelinek asking for permission to abandon his position on May 26. Up to this point, only turret No.II was damaged, otherwise there were no shell holes in the fort. Despite this, Major Jelinek granted Giebermann’s request without examining the situation. At 10pm that day, Giebermann announced that Verle would be abandoned, with only 42 of the garrison remaining. 2 ensigns, Weber and Knopfmacher stayed behind with the remaining garrison. On May 27, at about 6pm lieutenant Papak decided to return to the fort and take control. Between May 28 and 30, the fort was fully reoccupied. Since the Lieutenant-in-chief Giebermann refused to return to Verle, he was transferred to a military hospital in Trento. At the suggestion of Major Jelinek, Giebermann received the Military Cross of Merit class III, Giebermann was later transferred to the Eastern Front to command a mortar battery. Lieutenant Papak was also awarded the Military Cross of Merit class III alongside Weber and Knopfmacher who received the Bronze Medal of Bravery, with Knopfmacher ultimately getting the Military Cross of Merit class III.

=== Damage from the second shelling ===
- August 15: a 30.5 cm shell hits below gun tower No.III, a 34 cm hole was punctured in the armored howitzer dome. The damage rendered turret No.III unusable.
- August 16: hole punctured between turret No.IV and the armored observation turret, 3 seriously wounded. Turret No.III was hit again, with 2 severely wounded, guns inoperable.
- August 19: hole shot through pre-armor of turret No.II
- August 20: turret No.II’s pre-armor is punctured again
- August 22: Hidden battery of 8 cm guns hit, with 1 gun being unusable because of a broken barrel
- August 23: 30.5 cm shell punctures between turrets No.II and III, and lands in a standby room. 3 killed, 6 seriously injured. The postern between the melee facility and the fort was also severed.
- August 27: the front side armored machine gun turret in the melee facility ripped out by a near-miss 30.5 cm shell. The casemate block was also punctured
- August 28: ceiling above the standby room in the caponier punctured, with the shell hitting the second armored machine gun turret. This turret was torn out and slid into the frontal trenches. The casemate block was also hit, with the emergency exit of the battery block being damaged.
- August 29: aisle above the battery block punctured, with several killed or seriously wounded
- August 31: ceiling of the postern punctured between the casemate and battery blocks, it stopped in the passage of the battery block near turret No.II
- September 1–7: 30.5 cm shell hits between armored dome and pre-armor of turret No.IV, the shell exploded inside the tower. The dome was ripped into 3 parts and removed from its housings, the gun was destroyed but the barrel was found intact across the fort. (This was the only dome of its kind to be destroyed, a subsequent investigation concluded faulty casting.)
- October 31: shell punctures the casemate battery, hitting the telephone exchange
- An Unspecified Date: a shell punctures the casemate block

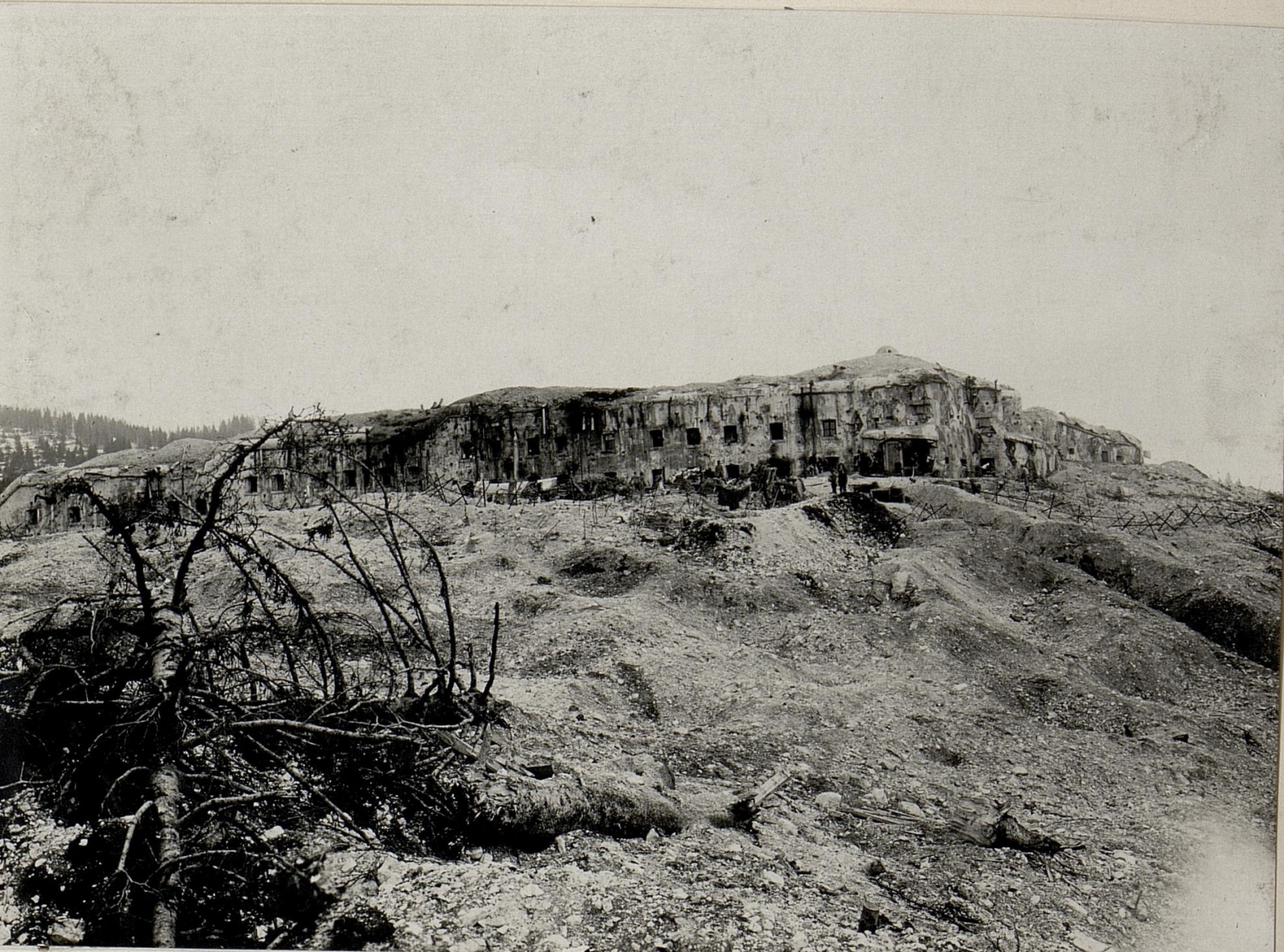
The land outside of the fort closely resembled a moonscape after weeks of shelling.

=== Damage sustained ===
From May 23, 1915 to May 15, 1916, the damages and shells landed on the fort’s grounds are:

- 30.5 cm: 1710
- 28 cm: 3135
- 21 cm: 1200
- Hits on concrete ceilings: 1872
- Impacts on Steel armor: 55
- Hits on domes that didn’t puncture: 28
- Pre-armor of turret No.II punctured 3 times
- Pre-armor of turret No.III hit twice
- The concrete ceiling was punctured 16 times

The average shells per area of concrete is 60%. By May 15, the guns had been removed and placed in field positions.

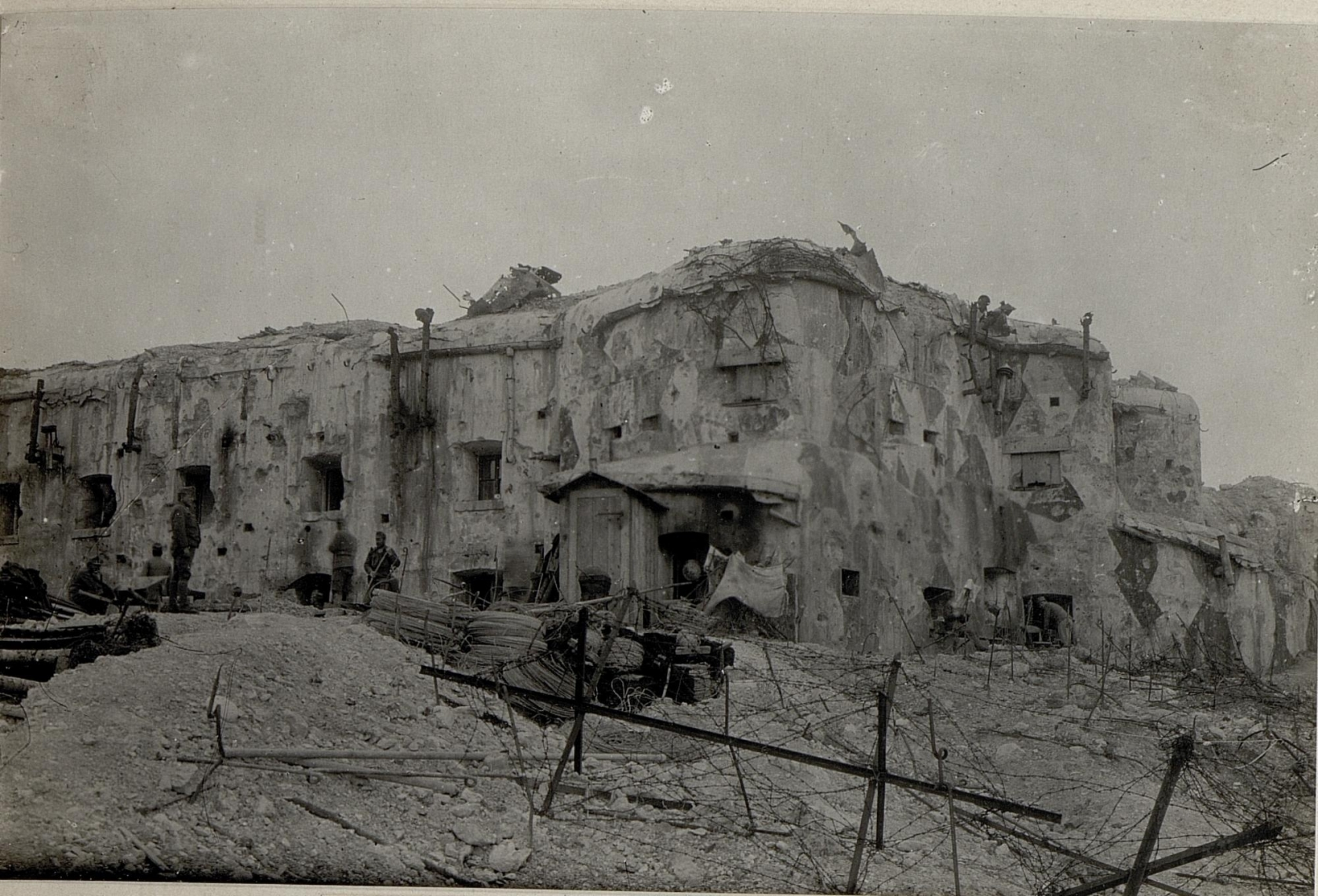
Austro-Hungarian soldiers survey the damage after an Italian barrage.

=== Infantry attacks ===
- May 30, 1915: Italian Alpini battalion “Basson” attacked, this was repulsed.
- August 24, 1915: weak attacks by infantry brigade “Ivrea”

=== Distribution of guns to field positions ===
As it turned out, the fort could withstand the 28 cm shell but not the 972 lb 30.5 cm shell. So on August 24, 1915 the guns were removed to safer field positions. Turret No.II was removed and placed behind Verle at Malga Cima di Verle. The second usable gun, turret No.I, was removed and added near turret No.II at Malga Cima di Verle. (This is the so-called “Half-Battery Malga Cima di Verle”.) By September 1915, the guns were emplaced and ready to fire. In Oct. the damaged turrets No.III and IV were disassembled as spare parts. The trench caponier’s 2 6 cm guns were useless where they were, so they were moved to the infantry barracks at Basson, about ¾ mile away. They were in place and ready to fire by the end of September 1915. The hidden 8 cm battery, which had become unusable because of a damaged barrel, was moved to Infantry Base No.50 near the Vezzena Opservation Post. After a replacement barrel arrived in Dec. 1915, the gun was also usable. Only the machine guns and 1 of the 8 cm guns remained at Fort Verle. Although the fort was still occupied, its crews were greatly reduced.

=== Structural reinforcement ===
After the shelling stopped on July 25, the armored domes were repaired and made operational. In addition to this, the time between shelling and at night was used to patch up shell holes using fast-drying concrete. The fort was also reinforced by gravel filled baskets called Gabion, up to 3.3 ft thick. The extra spaces in the gun fountains were filled with concrete, in hopes that it would reinforce the weak pre-armor. Since the necessary structural reinforcement of the ceilings couldn't be carried out outdoors, for the Italians would see it, they were carried out indoors. New posterns were also made, because the old ones had been shot up during the shelling, connecting the basement of the casemate block with the fixed observation turret in the battery block. A 500 ft long postern was planned from the road to the fort and was started from both sides, but was never finished. There was also a plan to equip the guns at Costa Alta with the uninstalled M14 guns from the Valmorbia works, although this too was abandoned because it was too difficult.

=== Fort Verle’s final task ===
At the beginning of the Battle of Asiago, Turret No.I was reinstalled along with 2 new 9 cm mortars. One of the mortars was located in the gun fountain of turret No.IV. This brought the total weapons in Verle to 1 10 cm gun, 2 9 cm mortars, and 1 hidden 8 cm gun, all of which fired on the Italian positions during the Battle of Asiago.

As the battle raged to the south, extensive repairs were made to bring the fort back to operational levels. This consisted of the fixing of the armored towers of turret Nos.I, II, and III, and the construction of a fake concrete dome over tower No.IV. The fort was occupied by Italian infantry just before the end of the war.

=== Personnel losses ===
13 people died in the fort, it is not stated how many of the seriously wounded died after being removed.

=== Fort Verle’s ammo consumption ===
- 10 cm: 12,927
- 8 cm: 6,541

== Post-war to today ==
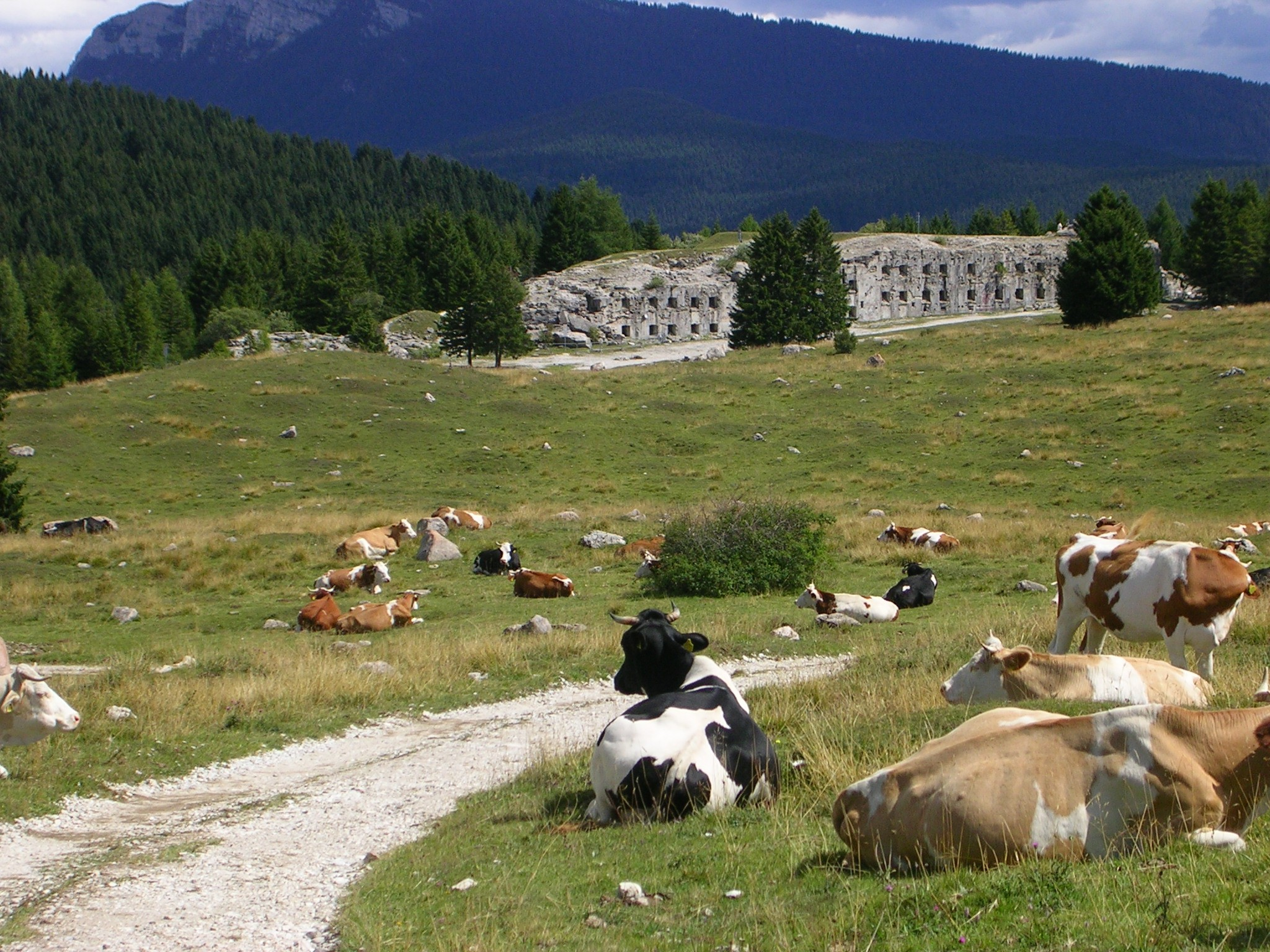
A once massive and powerful fort is only visited by cows and the occasional intrepid tourist.

The fort had been severely damaged during World War I, and was more severely damaged when the Italians salvaged it for steel in their war against Ethiopia. Due to the explosions needed to extract the steel, the fort is in extreme disrepair and ruin, with entering Fort Verle prohibited.

== Appearances in popular literature ==
The writer Fritz Weber, the same one that stayed back with the defenders, was stationed at Fort Verle, and described it in his book Grenades and Avalanches 17 years later. Fort Verle was also mentioned by writer and filmmaker Luis Trenker, in his autobiography Sperrefort Rocca Alta, partially about his time stationed at Verle.
