= Fort Vezzena =

Austro-Hungarian fortification in the Trentino

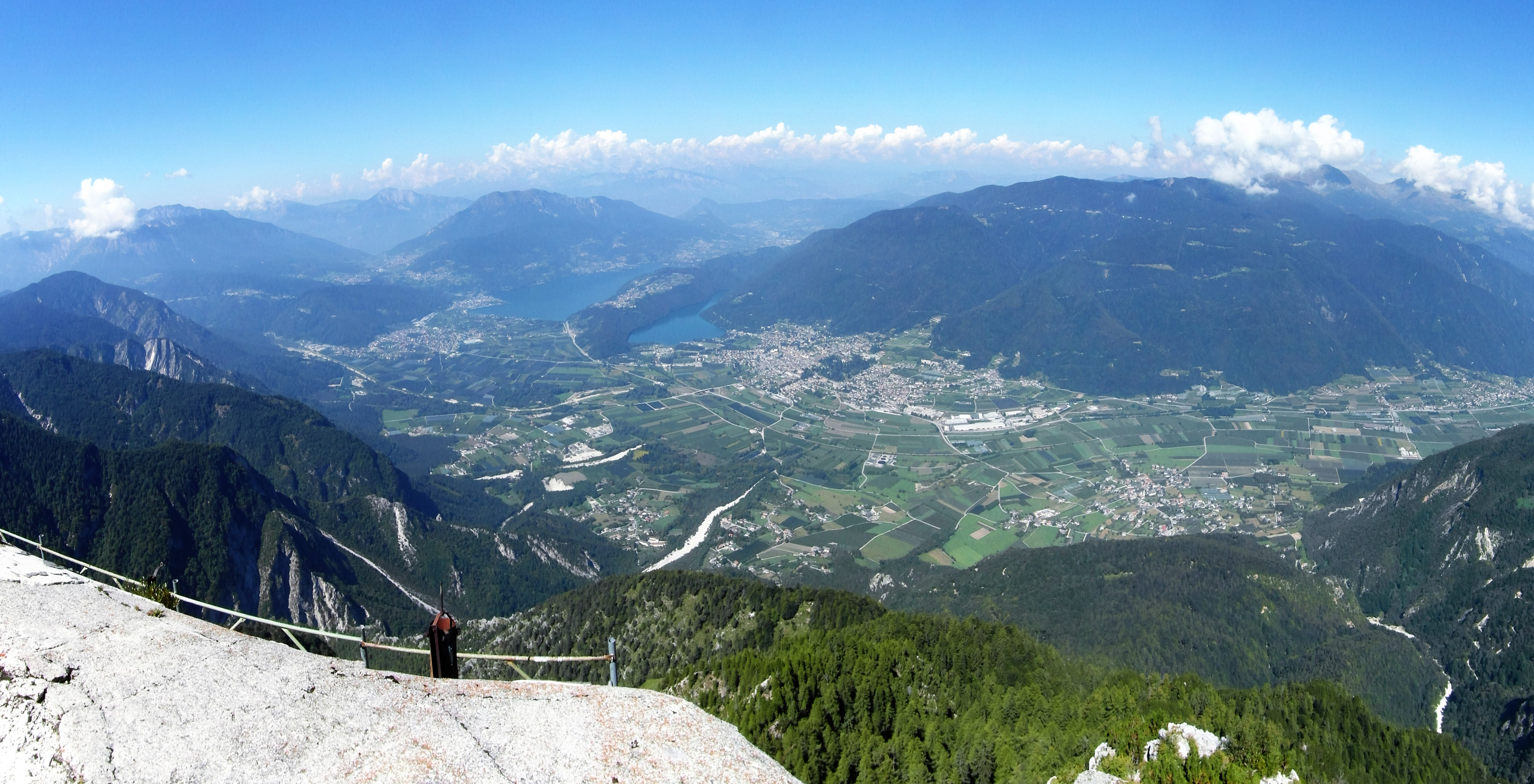
The view from where the observation dome once sat, capturing the same view it had. Between the two lakes in the middle, towards the farther end, was the Forts of Colle delle benne and Tenna.

Observation Post Vezzena, also known as Fort Vezzena, is an Austria-Hungarian fortification built south of the northern Italian city of Trento. Vezzena is built on the top of Cima Vezzana at 6300 ft, with a great view for watching over the Valsugana Valley as well as the Asiago Valley. This is exactly why it was nicknamed “The Eye of the Plateau”. It is a fortification built without artillery, because its sole purpose was to provide observation for Fort Verle. Observation Post Vezzena was the highest and easternmost fortification in the Lavarone-Folgaria group, a group of forts built between the municipalities of Lavarone and Folgaria. It is also the northernmost work of the chain of Austro-Hungarian fortifications in Italy. The post was built between 1907 and wasn't finished when the Italians declared war in May 1915.

== Armament ==
- 2 armored domes sporting 2 machine guns each
- A rotating observation turret sporting a machine gun
- 3 30 cm acetylene spotlights
- Armored observation stand

The crew of Vezzena was a detachment of the k.u.k State Shooting Regiment “Trent” No.I, with 1 officer and 45 enlisted men crewing Vezzena. There could also be optical communication with the forts of Verle, Lusern, Busa Grande, and Monte Agaro; there was also a telephone line to Fort Verle. The fort was built with 3 floors, and the whole fort was made out of masonry reinforced by steel. The post had 12 cm of steel protecting the wall of the semi-circular trench, which was considered field-gun proof. The observation of the Valsugana Valley was carried out by an armored observation turret built on the back left side of the post. The resupply of the post was carried out using a supply road in full view of the Italian guns in the area. After the shelling started, a supply road had to be carved into the steep orthern face. Water was piped in from Verle along with power, since there was no generator in Vezzena.

== Contents ==
Ground floor:

- 1 Guard room
- 1 Trench gun stand
- 1 Toilet
- 1 Kitchen
- 1 Ammo Magazine
- 1 tomb for 6 coffins

First floor:

- 1 Barracks
- 1 Medical room
- Commander's room
- 1 Ammo Magazine
- 1 Supply Magazine

Second floor:

- A signal station able to face North and West
- 1 B.u.M 14 rotating observation stand
- 1 telephone exchange with an optical station facing east
- 1 Ammo Magazine
- 1 B.St.f 3 fixed observation stand
- 2 B.u.M.f 11 and 12 fixed armored domes with 2 machine guns each
- 1 M.u.S.H. 16 armored machine gun stand with a spotlight
- 1 emergency exit to the ground floor

Due to the fact that Vezzena's supply road was in plain sight, the fort was stocked with 200,000 MG rounds and 90 days worth of food.

== First shelling ==
Immediately after the start of hostilities on May 23, 1915, the fort was shelled by the 28 cm batteries at Bosco Azari, in addition to the 21 cm mortars at Porta Di Manazzano and 14.9 cm guns of Forte Verena. The results were abysmal, with nothing of importance being hit. The first infantry attack was also repelled on May 30, when the Alpini Battalion “Basson” attacked Vezzena and Fort Verle. After the first phase of shelling ended, structural reinforcements were carried out.

== Second shelling ==
The second shelling started in August 1915, where in addition to 28 cm, 21 cm, and 14.9 cm guns, the Italians also used the massive 30.5 cm (12 in) guns to shell the fort. The result was the near destruction of Post Vezzena. This is the damages incurred and the dates inflicted:

- August 16: the armored spotlight and machine gun stand on the top of Vezzena was hit and destroyed
- August 17: A shell hits the casemate block and explodes on the first floor.
- August 18: the top of the right armored machine gun dome hit, which made the dome temporarily unusable. 2 holes shot through the roof, resulting in the destruction of the telephone room.
- August 19: The already destroyed spotlight/machine gun turret on the top of the building was hit and propelled out of its fountain into the trenches below. A shell passed through the roof and passed through the building, landing in the surrounding trenches without exploding.
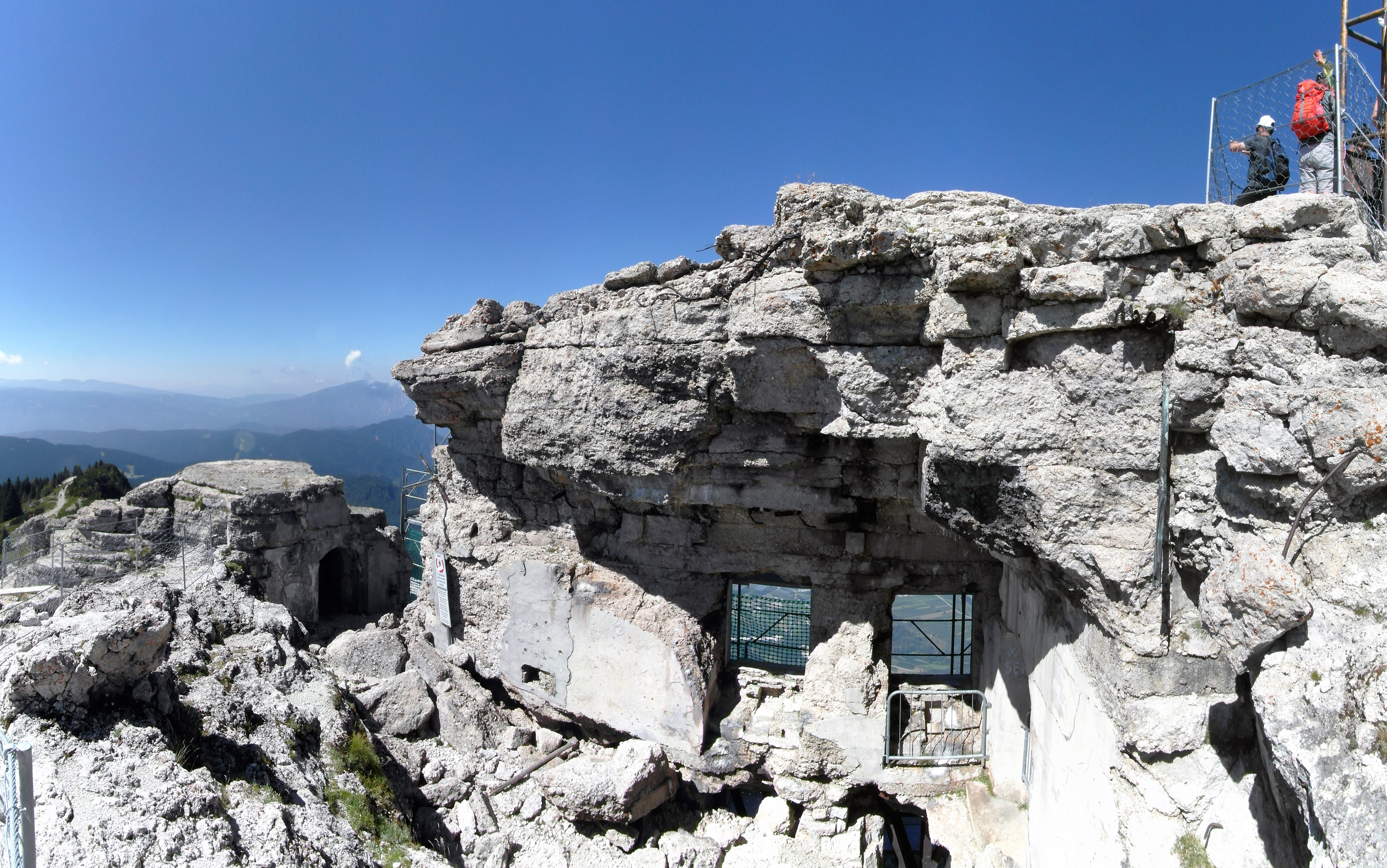
- What remains of the top floor is exposed to the elements today, slowly weathering away and being eroded.
  August 21st: the already unusable right armored machine gun dome was dislodged from its housings by a shell and slid into the frontal trenches. The left armored machine gun dome was also hit and was unstable and unable to be occupied, but still remained in place.

The crew left Vezzena during the shelling and hid out in a stone casemate. After an infantry attack by Italian regiments 161 and 162 failed on August 24, the shelling of Vezzena diminished but continued until the autumn of 1915. Despite this, in September, the rotating observation turret was removed from its housings and plunged into the front trench. In addition to this, the water pipe coming from Fort Verle was severed and the cisterns started leaking due to the constant shell impacts. In February 1916, measures were taken to fix these by drilling out caverns, adding a more protected water line leading from Fort Verle, and the construction of a cable car coming from Monte Rover.

In total the fort's grounds were hit with 2027 21 cm, 28 cm, and 30.5 cm shells, in addition to 4200 14.9 cm shells. The commander of Vezzena, Lieutenant Schwarz was awarded the Golden Medal of Valor, alongside the Order of the Iron Crown (Similar to the German Iron Cross).

== Repairs ==
After the Italians were pushed back in the Battle of Asiago, repairs on Post Vezzena began. A new concrete ceiling was built, and the rotating observation stand and the right machine gun turret were pulled out of the frontal trenches and reinstalled in their housings. The first and second floors were scarcely touched because a shell had detonated inside them in the prior barrage. Several artillery observers were stationed at Vezzena to help conduct artillery during the Battle of Asiago.

== Post-war to today ==
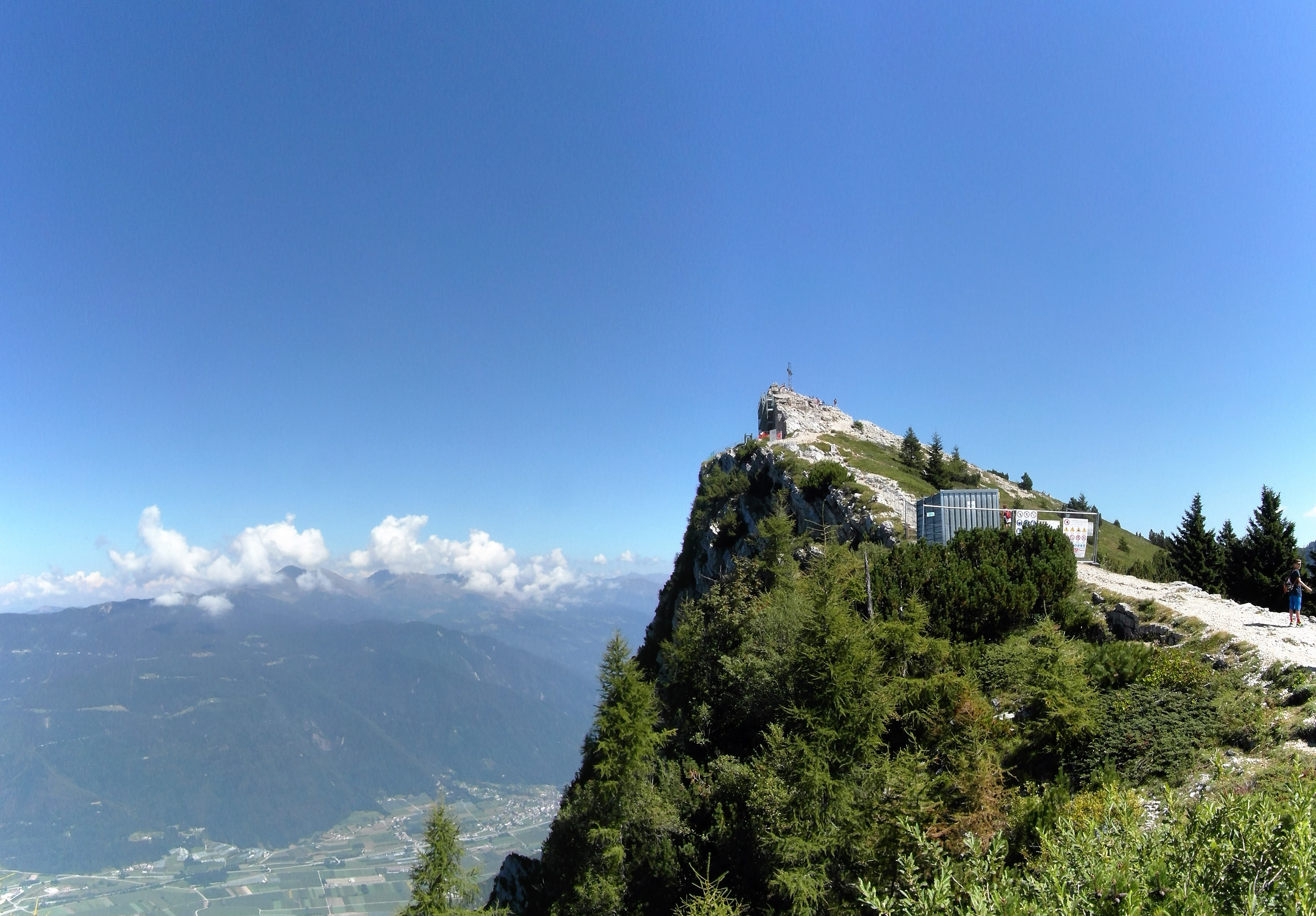
Post Vezzena today overlooking the valleys were it once called down artillery.

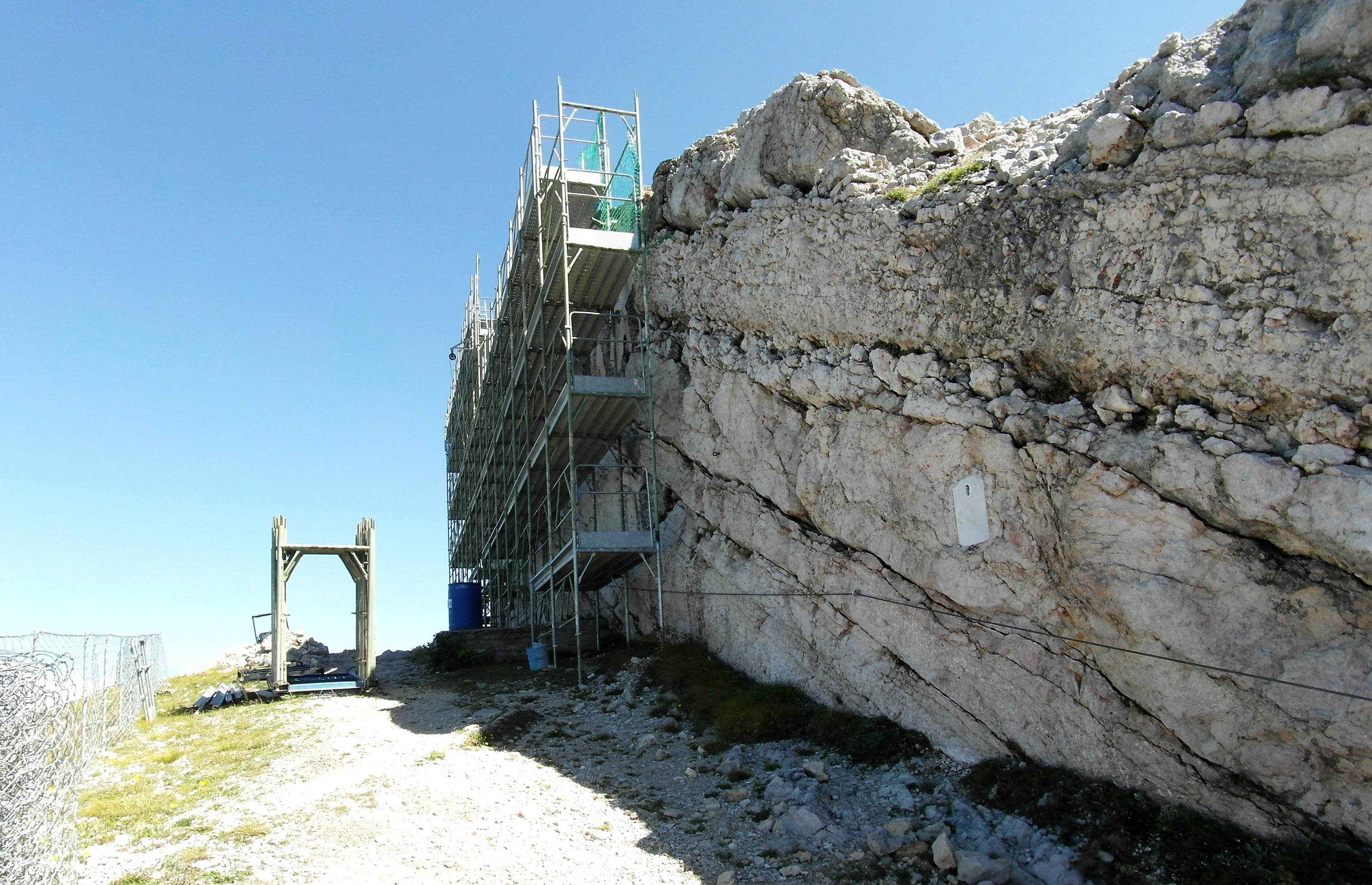
A picture take after 2016, when renovations on making the fort safer and more accessible.

The fort was decommissioned by the Italians on December 8, 1927. Vezzena is now severely damaged, both from the war and from the scrap collectors in the 1930s who salvaged it for steel in Italy's war against Ethiopia. Ironically, the scrap collectors did more damage to the fort by blowing parts of it up than the shelling did during World War I. The fort was scrapped on December 3, 1932. From the autumn of 2016 until July 2, 2017, Vezzena underwent renovations to make the fort more accessible. Despite the fact that the fort is in severe ruins, it is very busy in the summer time because of tourists.
