= Lake Lavarone =

Karstic lake in Trentino, Italy

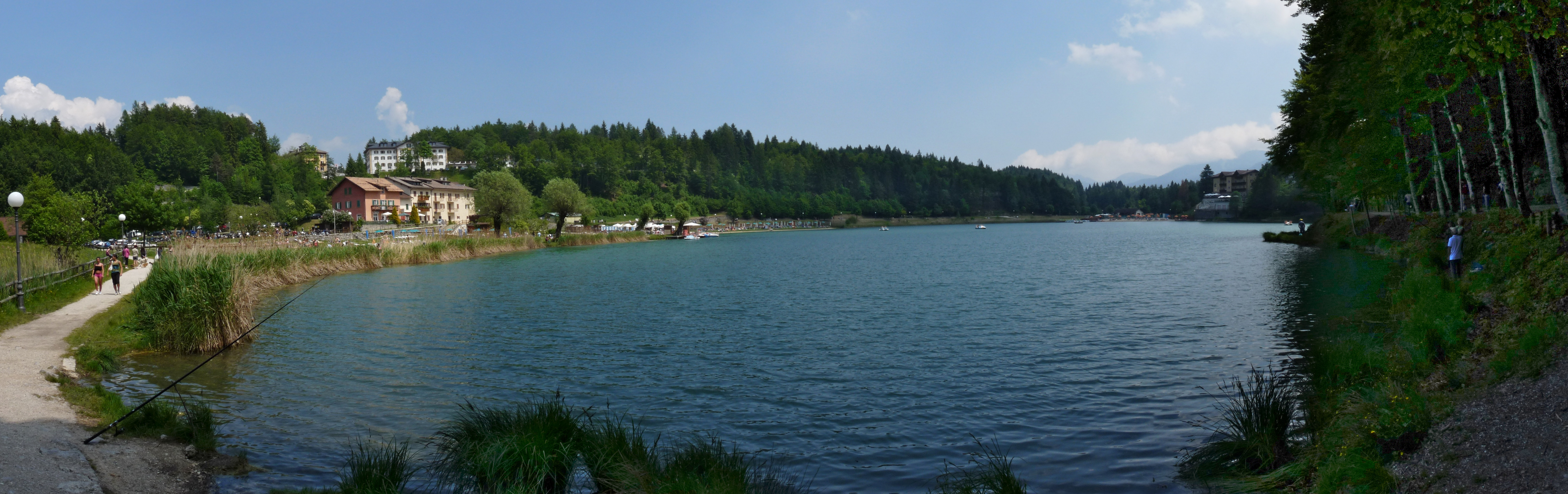
- The lake seen from the northern shore
- Interactive map of Lake Lavarone
- Location: Lavarone, Trento, Italy
- Coordinates: 45°56′24″N 11°15′36″E
- Type: Karstic
- Max. length: 0.4 km (0.25 mi)
- Max. width: 0.25 km (0.16 mi)
- Surface area: 0.064 km^{2} (0.025 sq mi)
- Average depth: 7.4 m (24 ft)
- Max. depth: 17 m (56 ft)
- Surface elevation: 1,079 m (3,540 ft)

Lake Lavarone is a small lake located in Lavarone, Trento, Italy at 1,079 meters above sea level. It has an area of 64,000 m² and a maximum depth of 17 meters.

Of karstic origin, it was created after the slow filling of a sinkhole. In 1972, some tree trunks were found still anchored with their roots to the bottom and dated using the carbon-14 method to 210 BC. The water accumulated in the sinkhole only after the soil became impermeable.

The lake’s water supply is provided by small surface springs. The waters drain through underground infiltrations and, in about an hour and a half, travel 3 km to the Centa valley, where they form the Vallempach waterfalls.

Due to the mild climate and the particular purity of its waters, Lake Lavarone is a significant tourist attraction for the Cimbrian highlands: it is equipped for bathing and fishing in summer and for ice skating during part of the winter period. In winter, it is also the site of a training course for under-ice rescue techniques, held since 1985 and organized by the Associazione Nazionale Istruttori Subacquei (ANIS).

According to a local legend, where the lake now stands, there was once a forest owned by two brothers who argued over its ownership. To punish them, God caused the forest to sink and filled the depression with water to eliminate the source of their dispute.

== See also ==
- Lavarone

== Bibliography ==
- Tomasi, Gino (2004). I trecento laghi del Trentino [The Three Hundred Lakes of Trentino] (in Italian). Trento: Artimedia-Temi. ISBN 978-88-85114-83-8.
