= Fort Sebastiano =

Austro-Hungarian fortification in the Southern Trentino

Coordinates: 45°54′56″N 11°13′44″E

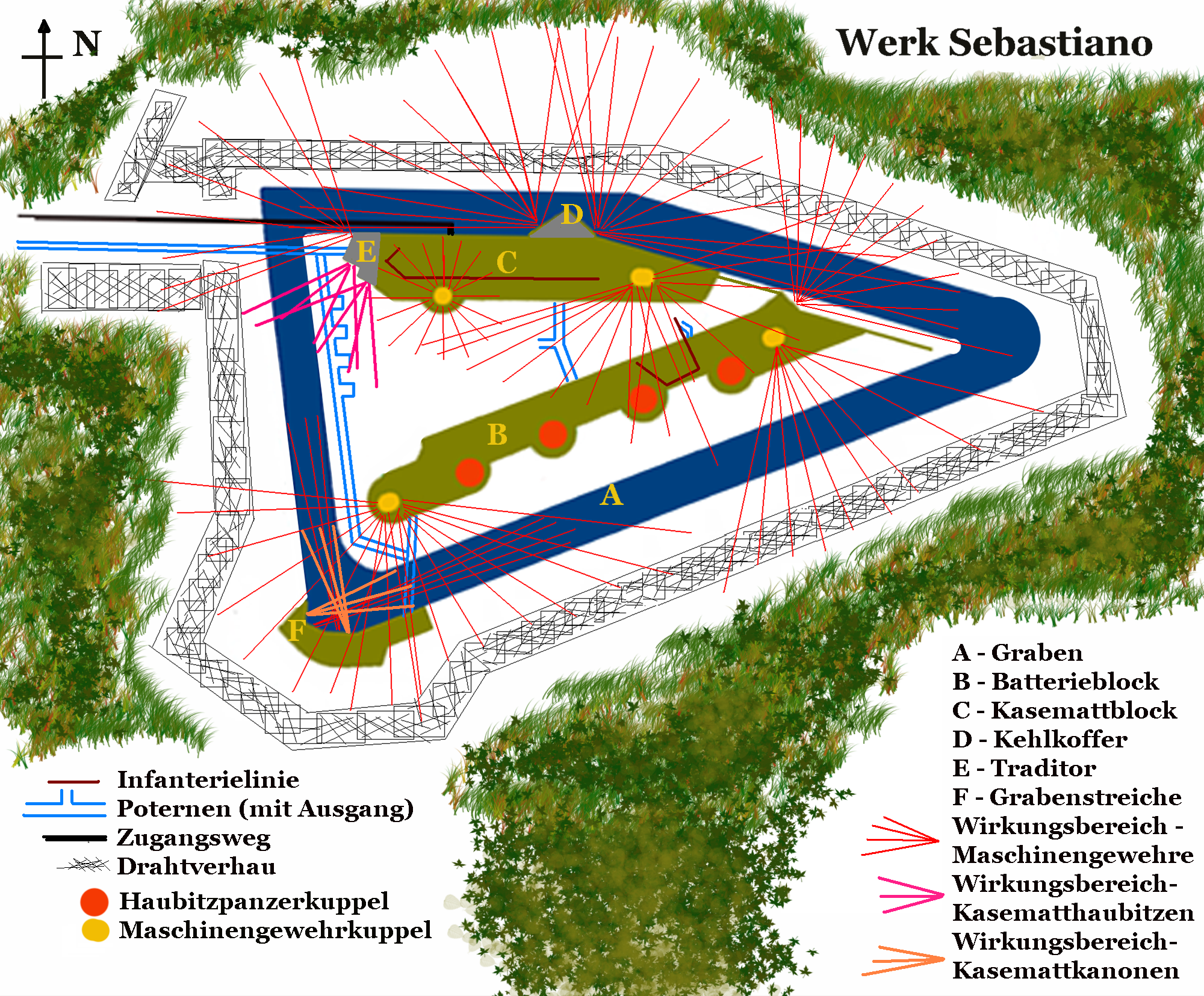
A diagram of which ways the guns of Sebastiano fired

Fort Sebastiano, also known as Fort Cherle, was an Austro-Hungarian fortification built between the municipalities of Lavarone and Folgaria. Sebastiano was built between 1909 and 1914, and was one of the newest and most up to date fortifications in the Austro-Hungarian Empire when Italy declared war in May 1915. Sebastiano was built at an altitude of 1,445m on the mountain of Malga Cherle. The building is in a giant triangle shape, with the side facing the Italians left uncovered by earth so that additional cannons could be fitted to cover the approaches of the fort.

== Armament and crews ==
- 4 10 cm howitzers in rotating armored domes
- 2 10 cm howitzers in a battery for flanking fire
- 2 6 cm Quick-firing guns in the flanking battery
- 28 Machine guns throughout the fort
- 150 artillerymen and 50 infantrymen for defense outside the fort.

== World War I ==
When Italy declared war on May 24, 1915, Fort Sebastiano had just been finished being built.

From 7-8pm on May 25, 1915, the fort was shelled by Italian 28 cm guns near the Italian Forte Compolongo. The next day, Sebastiano was hit by 9 28 cm shells. In 1915, Sebastiano fired its guns in support of the Austro-Hungarian Spring Offensive, which ultimately pushed the Italian batteries back out of range of Sebastiano. At the end of hostilities in Nov. 1918, the fort was occupied by Italian infantry, because the Austrians had quietly abandoned Sebastiano. Unlike some other forts of its group, Sebastiano was never attacked by Italian infantry.

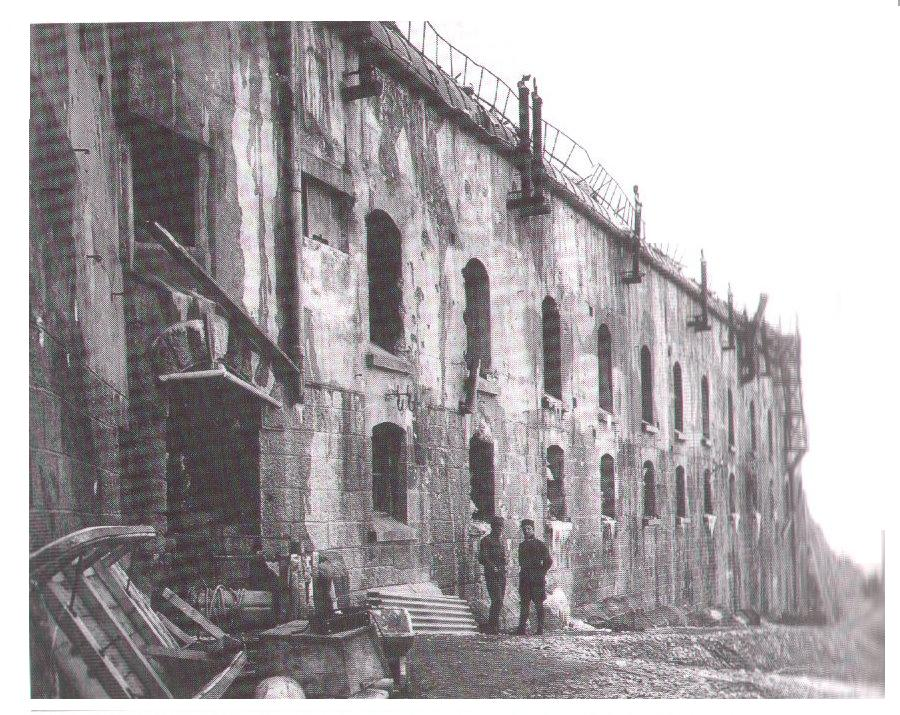
While a fair amount of debris is present, the fort is relatively unharmed in this photo.

== Post-war to today ==
Fort Sebastiano was decommissioned from the Royal Army on Dec. 8, 1927. As of Jan. 1, 1931, the fort was rented by the Municipality of Folgaria for 29 years. However, as of May 5, 1935, the fort has been owned by the Municipality of Folgaria. After the fort had been bought, the fort was reduced to what we can see today by salvagers who dynamited the fort to extract the steel within.
