= Busa Grande fortification =

Austro-Hungarian fortification in the Southern Trentino, Italy

Coordinates: 46.0356°N 11.2979°E

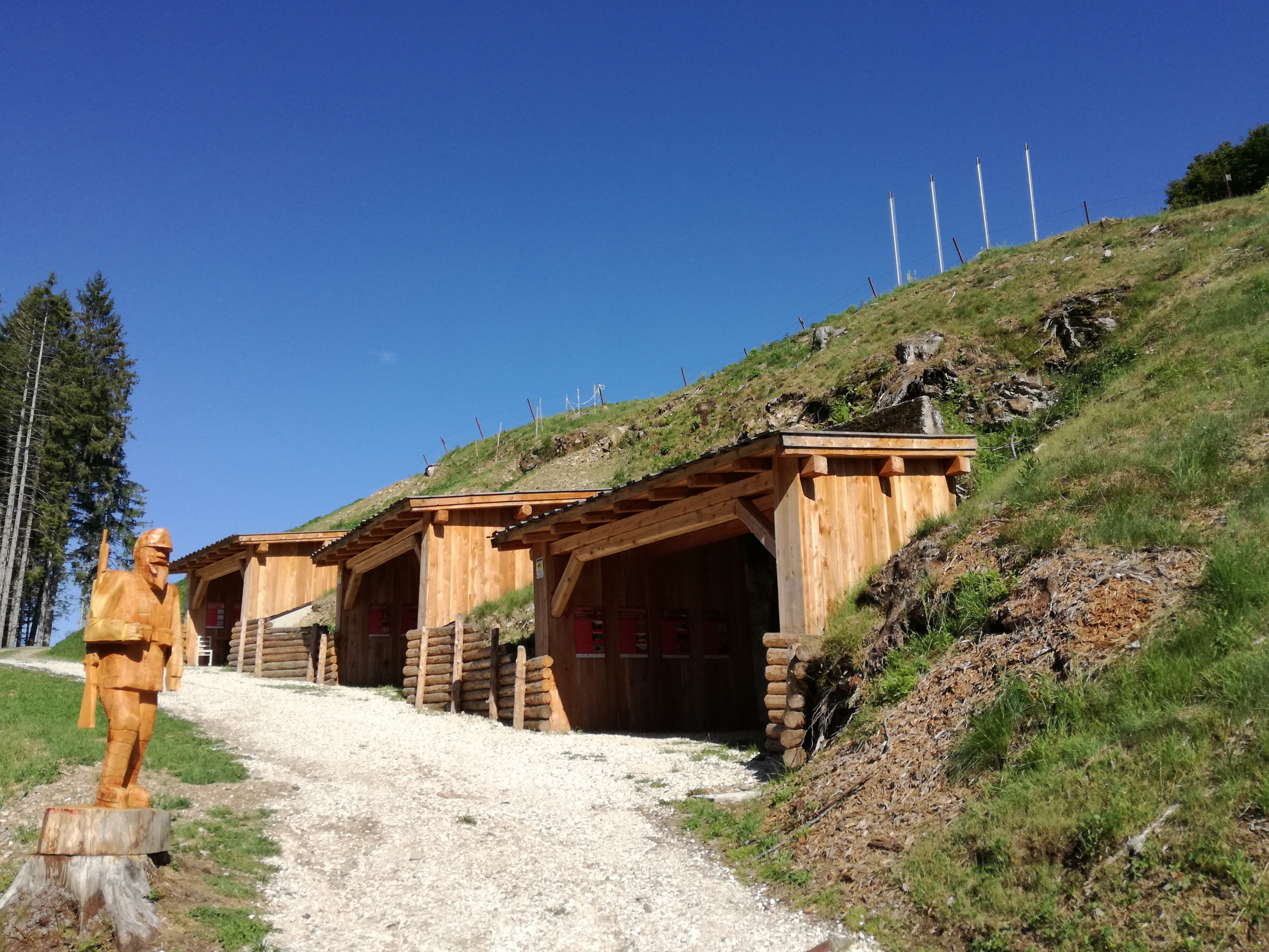
The entrance to the underground works.

Fort Busa Grande is an Austro-Hungarian fort built between March and May of 1915. The fort had the aim of retiring the antiquated forts of Col De Le Benne and Tenna, which were nearby. The work on the fort was completed very quickly due to the use of Russian prisoners of war. They disarmed the outdated fort of Col De Le Bene and transferred its arms to the newly constructed Busa Grande. The fort was built at the extreme range of the Italian heavy artillery batteries at Porta Manazzo and the Sella Valley. The fort housed a battery of howitzers in a shell-proof cave. 2 10cm M05 guns and the observation dome from De Benne were placed here after being removed from their locations.

Busa Grande was equipped with a large amount of artillery, with eight 9 cm QF guns emplaced in three field batteries. Later, four 12 cm guns were emplaced in field batteries nearby. Busa Grande was an Austro-Hungarian fortification with its own electricity, water, small field hospital, ammo supply, a kitchen, and a telephone exchange. Supply was not a problem because the supply road from Pergine was out of sight of the Italian artillery. Busa Grande was never hit by enemy artillery, but the remains of Italian 28 cm shells litter the approaches to the fort.

When the Austro-Hungarian Spring Offensive, also known as the Battle of Asiago, was launched, it pushed the front line out of range of the guns located at or nearby Busa Grande. Summarily, the fort was disarmed and its guns were moved to more active parts of the front line. Despite being disarmed, an anti-aircraft and spotlight battery was stationed at Busa Grande to protect Levico Terme.

== Post-war ==
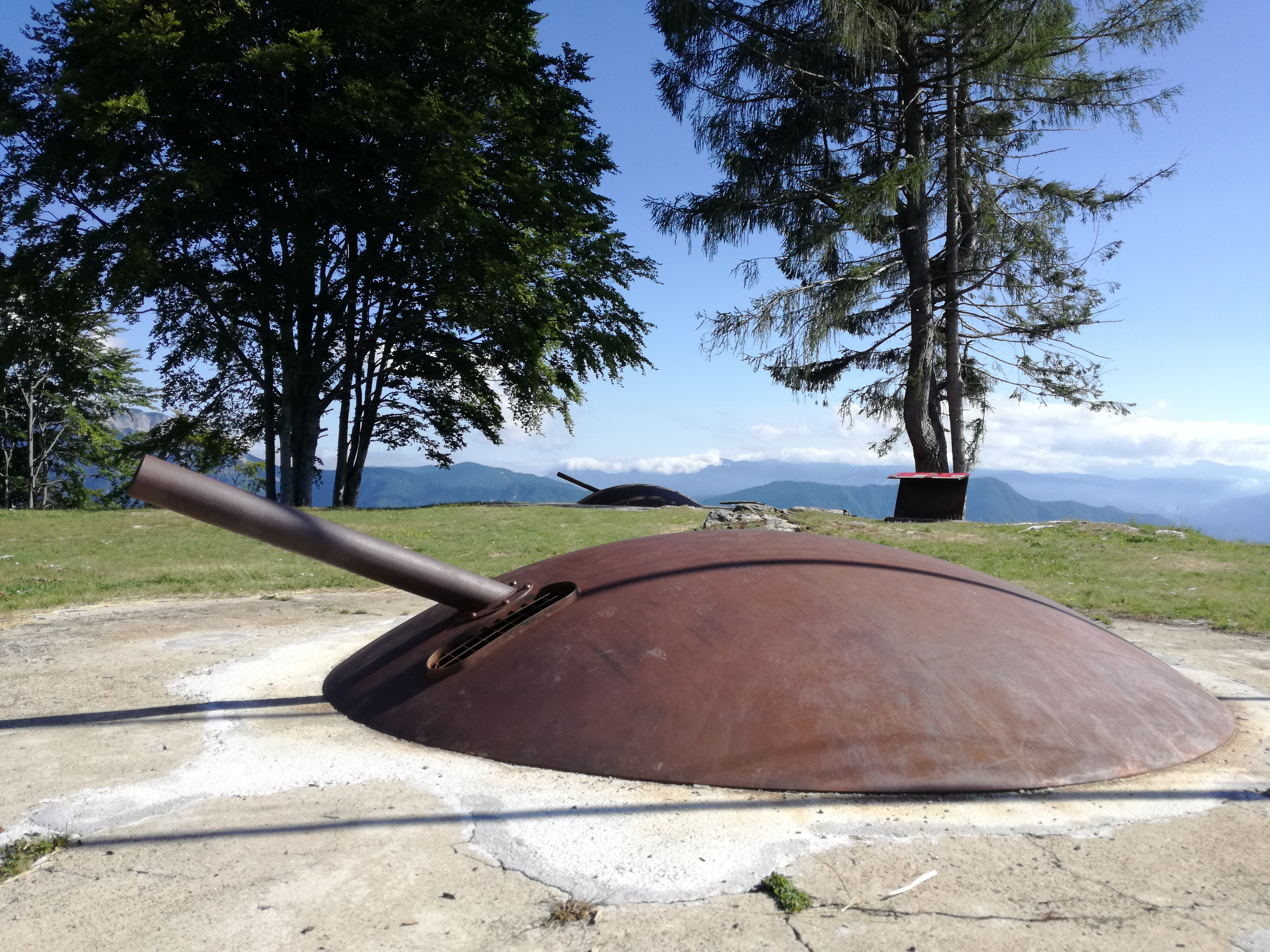
The new replacement howitzer domes where the original ones sat.

After the war the fort was looted by the locals and the internal components like the steel and wiring were taken out by the Italian authorities. The commune of Vignola-Falesina began restoring the fort in 2014, with renovations being finished in 2016. When the renovations were finished in Sept. 2016, the howitzer battery was opened to the public. It was later found out that the replacement armored domes were the wrong specifications and had to be replaced.
