= Valmorbia works =

Austro-Hungarian fort in the Trentino

Coordinates: 45.8263°N 11.0883°E

The Valmorbia Works, also known as Fort Pozzacchio, represented the last permanent fortification built by Austria-Hungary on the Italian front. Valmorbia is built at an altitude of 882 metres (2,894 ft) above sea level. The fort was partially built on the slopes of Monte Pasubio between 1909 and the outbreak of hostilities with Italy in May 1915. Like many other forts of the time, it was made mostly of rock and the rest concrete. Since water was hard to obtain, an intricate system for collecting water was built so that every drop went into a storage tank.

The fort has two levels connected by a concrete staircase; in addition, a third level was sketched out but never built. There is a road rising from the commune of Vallarsa and passing through two tunnels, one of which is equipped with a rearguard station for defending the access road. The rearguard had a heavy iron door that could block off the route to the fort. In 1913, a cable car station was built to facilitate the movement of construction supplies for the fort. A small-gauge railway was additionally built to rapidly move supplies up and down the mountain. Like all Austro-Hungarian fortifications constructed since the turn of the century, the fort was built to withstand indirect fire from howitzers and even 305 mm guns, the largest at the time. At the time that hostilities broke out only a few components of the fort were completed, most notably the moat surrounding the works. Additionally, two 10 cm cannons were supposed to be placed in rotating armored domes, but these were never installed or delivered.

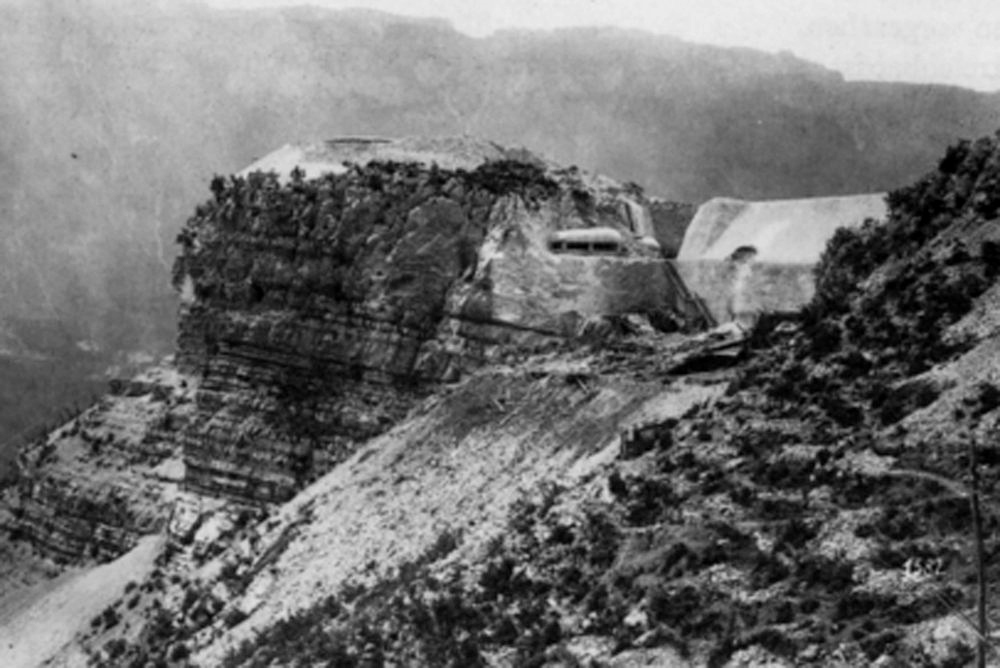
Most of the Work was built underground, and very few parts of the fort are above ground to minimize damage.

== World War I ==
At the end of May 1915, the Italian Alpini 6th regiment, Battalion “Vicenza”, occupied the nearby commune of Vallarsa and Monte Pasubio, which overlooks Valmorbia. At the same time, companies 56a and 57a of the Alpini regiment "Verona" took up positions on Monte Zugna alongside a mountain artillery battery. The fort was abandoned by the Austro-Hungarians on June 3, 1915, without much of a fight. The 80th Infantry Regiment of the "Rome" Brigade occupied Valmorbia until October 1915. As the front line moved to the north, the Italians relegated the fort to a supply depot. During the Italian occupation of the fort, Italian engineers made no attempt to arm Valmorbia, which made it weak in the coming battles. The Italians had the theory that they should not need to make a second line of defense because the front line should be the strongest. This theory was put to the test when the Austro-Hungarian 3rd and 11th armies smashed through the Italian lines and captured Valmorbia without a fight. The Austro-Hungarians held the fort for the remainder of the war. Between the nights of June 28 and 29, 1916, the Italians either neutralized or captured the sentries and captured several officers and non commissioned men living in shacks outside the fort. Then the Italians laid siege to the fort, although the siege was later broken with heavy casualties on both sides. The fort was abandoned in November 1918, with the suspension of hostilities.

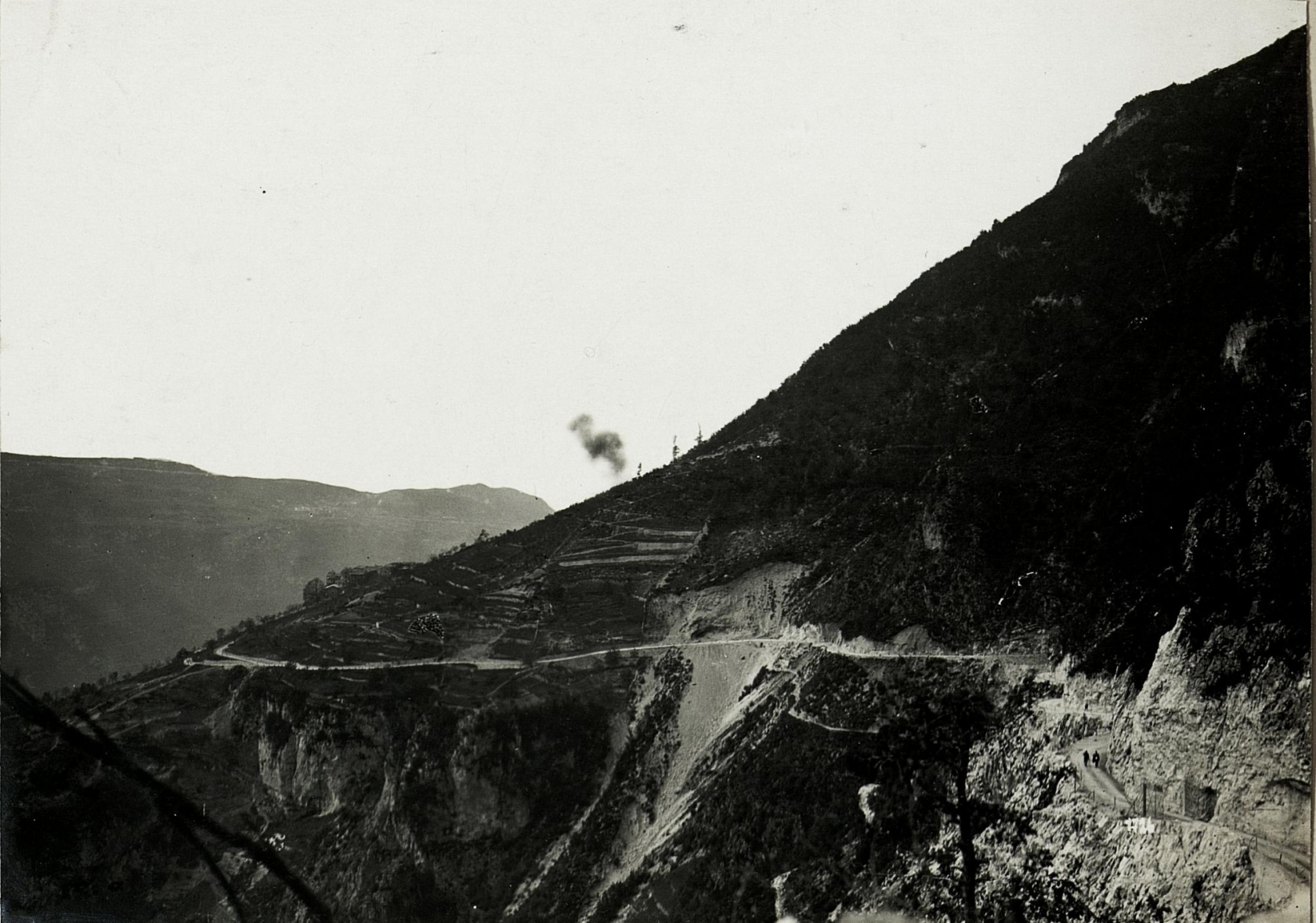
Valmorbia under fire from Italian 15cm guns, please note the 2 Austro-Hungarian soldiers walking nonchalantly in the lower right corner of the photo.

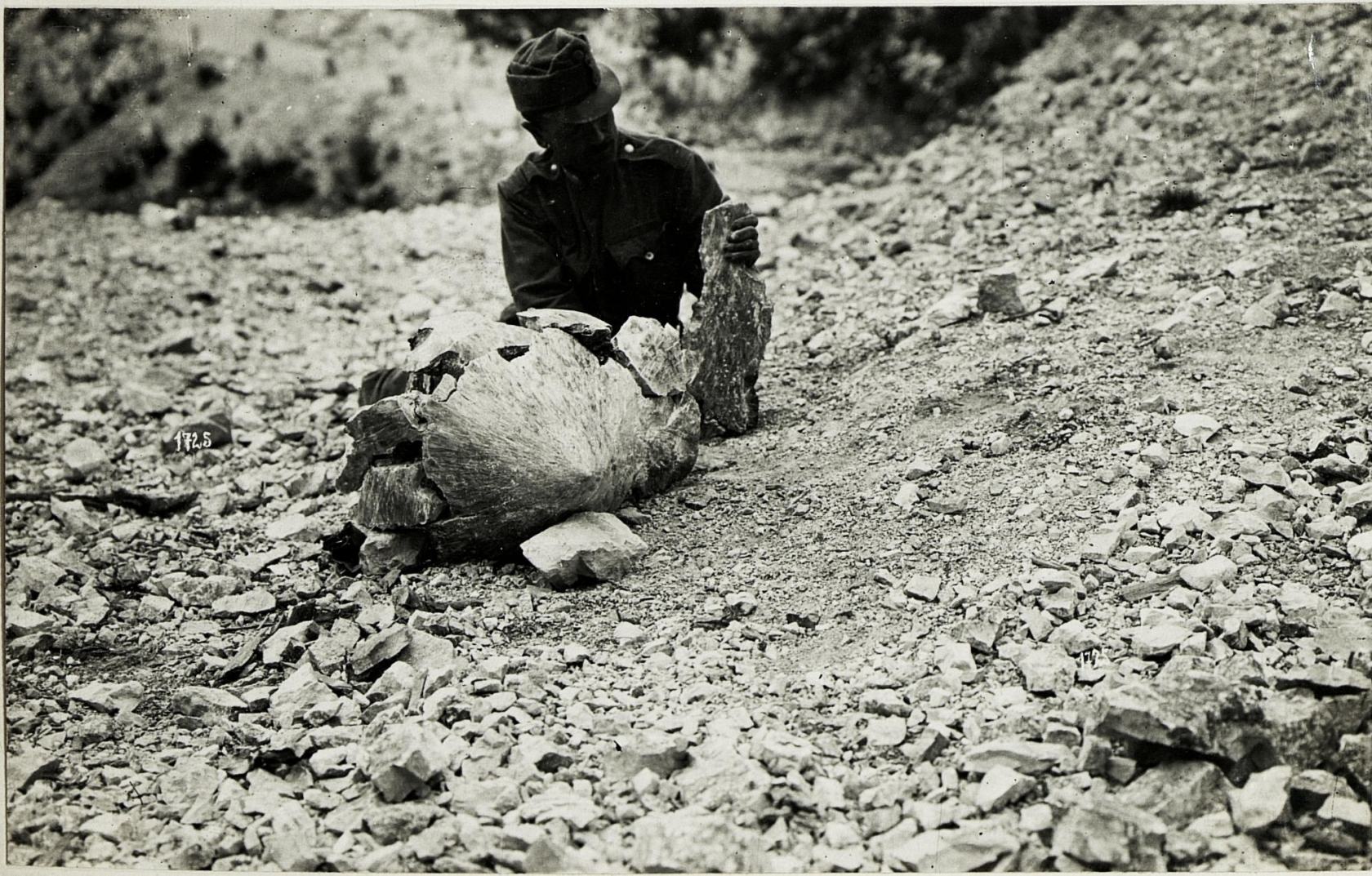
An Austro-Hungarian 42cm (16.5in) shell is examined by an Italian soldier.

== Armament (installed and not) ==
- Two 10 cm M9 guns, emplaced in Skoda armored rotating domes. Each had 30 cm of nickel armor and was 2.5 m wide. (Never installed)
- Six 75 mm guns (Never installed)
- A 25 cm spotlight (Never installed)
- Five 35 cm spotlights (Never installed)
- Two 90 cm spotlights in caves, protected by thick metal shields (Never installed)
- An observation dome (Never installed)
- Four 10 cm howitzers in casemates (Never installed)
- Ten 8 mm machine guns (Uninstalled in May 1915)

The spotlights were meant to be mounted on rails so that they could roll in and out of the fort. When Italy declared war in May 1915, the 10 cm armored domes and guns were en route to the fort. They made it as close as the railway station at Calliano, 20 kilometres away, before being shipped to Trento to be added to the defenses.

== Post-war ==
The fort was discharged from military ownership on August 12, 1927. In 1932, it was acquired by the peacetime government, where all of the metal was extracted. What remained of the fort was sold to a private individual. In 2005, a local municipality acquired the property and continued the renovation that had been started in 1998. The fort opened to public access on May 24, 2015.
