= Fort Serrada =

Fort in northern Italy

Coordinates: 45.8795°N 11.1883°E

Fort Serrada is an Austro-Hungarian fort built 3.8 km south of the municipality of Folgaria in northern Italy. It was the last of seven forts in the Lavarone-Folgaria group of fortifications. The fort's role was to block the road towards the Coe pass from the south. Serrada was so modern that it was ranked No. 5 in forts of the whole Austro-Hungarian Empire.

== Construction ==
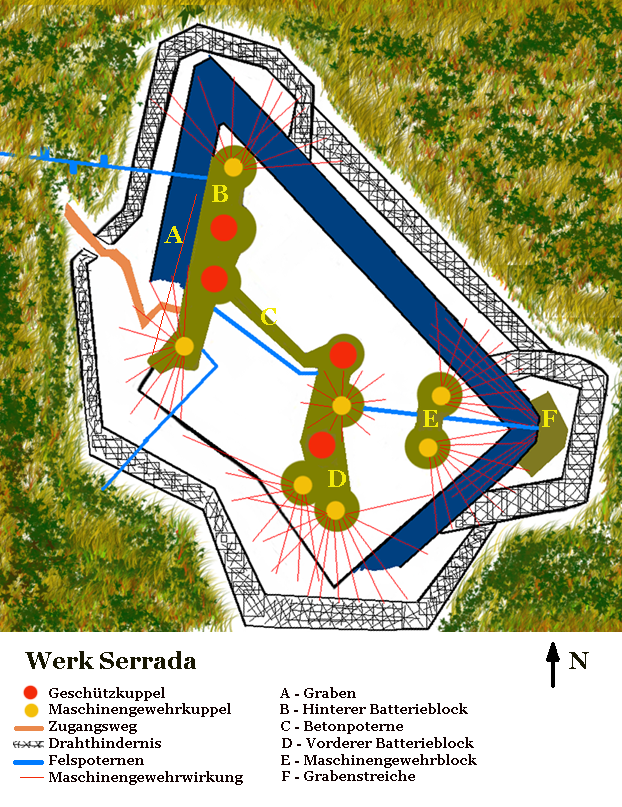
A firing diagram detailing the firing sectors of each gun

Fort Serrada was built between 1911 and September 12, 1914. Serrada was like the other forts in the Lavarone-Folgaria group, and unlike the previous ones of the so called "Vogl style", the guns were separated so that a single shell couldn't render the fort useless. The fort was also built in two blocks: the casemate block and the battery block, which were separate. They were built parallel to each other and were connected by an external postern. The separation decreased the chance of a shell hitting the fort in the event of a barrage.

The concrete postern was replaced when it was destroyed in June 1915, and a new one was drilled through solid rock. The armored machine guns were linked to an entrance in the fort via the trenches by an underground tunnel. The fort was surrounded by trenches on three sides, some of which were seven metres deep. The guns were emplaced in natural rock to give them extra protection from artillery. In addition, the ammunition magazines were drilled into the solid rock and were connected to the guns by shell elevators. The concrete ceiling was approximately 2.5 metres thick and was reinforced with steel I-beams above the casemates. Only a 30.5 cm shell could penetrate the reinforced ceilings. The fort cost 1,969,000 Crowns (Austro-Hungarian currency) to build.

== Trench caponier ==
The trench caponier was a two-storey building, with two 6 cm field guns on the first floor. There were also two armored casemates with two machine guns each on the second floor. There were also two 25 cm spotlights.

== Frontal machine gun block ==
There were two fixed armored MG domes with two Schwarzlose machine guns. Besides the crews, up to 20 additional men could be accommodated here, who went up to the top of the fort to defend from prepared positions. This is why this part of the complex had an emergency exit up to the top of the fort. The passage from the battery block to the trench caponier passed through this area.

== Frontal battery block ==
This area had two 10 cm Tower Howitzers (T.H.) mounted in armored domes with negative depressors, two fixed MG domes with two guns each, and a rotatable armored observation dome which could be equipped with a machine gun. When shelling permitted, a 60 cm spotlight could be set up on the roof of the battery block. This spotlight had the job of illuminating the road to Monte Maggio, among other things. The battery block had two floors; the bottom floor was primarily the meeting point of many posterns and tunnels leading out of the area. This was the entrance to the two machine-gun turrets, as well as an ammo magazine, a standby room, and a toilet.

== Rear battery and casemate block ==
This area mounted two 10 cm T.H. in domes with negative depressors, with each dome having a 35 cm spotlight. On each end of the block there were two armored fixed machine gun turrets with two guns each. In the rear of the fort there was an armored casemate with two machine guns and a 35 cm spotlight that could hit anything in the surrounding trenches. This area had four floors:

== Basement ==
- Three fuel depots
- One artillery ammo magazine
- One workshop
- A rechargeable battery room
- One engine room
- One barracks
- One defensible guard room
- A toilet
- A tomb for six caskets
- Two staircases to the first floor

== First floor ==
- A doctors office
- Infirmary
- Two supply rooms
- Three barracks
- One kitchen
- One officers' barracks
- A doctors/commanders room
- A fixed armored machine-gun casemate sporting two guns
- A toilet
- One ammo magazine for 10 cm howitzers
- Two ammo elevators
- Two staircases

== Second floor ==
- One barracks for the optical signal station to Monte Biaena and Monte Finonchio
- One barracks for the optical signal station to Monte Cornetto and Fort Sommo, with a telephone room
- Eight rooms for crew
- One trench casemate with weapons station, optical signal station and toilet
- One ammo magazine for 10 cm howitzers
- Two ammo elevators to guns
- Two staircases

== Top floor ==
- One 3-piece armored dome for three machine guns, with a 25 cm spotlight (left side)
- One 3-piece armored dome for four machine guns, with a 35 cm spotlight (right side)
- Two M.09 10 cm T.H.
- One ammo magazine for machine guns
- One ammo magazine for T.H.
- One postern with secure access to the top
- Two staircases

The two battery blocks were connected by an above-ground concrete postern; after this was destroyed, it was replaced by a 185 ft underground passageway. After the shelling of Forts Verle and Lusern, a covered entrance was made to the fort so supplies would be safer entering than over the clearly visible access roads. A 860-foot-long tunnel led from the access road to underneath Fort Serrada. This tunnel was also used for fresh air, because the original vent kept sucking in the gases from the exploding shells. To protect the crew from shelling, 13 caverns were drilled out of the rock as protection from 30.5 cm shells.

== Total armament ==
- Four 10 cm M09 howitzers in rotating armored domes
- Twenty-two 8 mm machine guns

== Crews ==
The wartime crew consisted of 4 officers and 227 enlisted men. The original troops meant to crew Serrada were on the Eastern Front when the war broke out, so second-rate troops were used to crew the fort until they arrived. The defense of the infantry works around the fort were entrusted to a marching battalion of the k.k. State Shooter Regiment "San Candido" No. III

== Combat operations ==
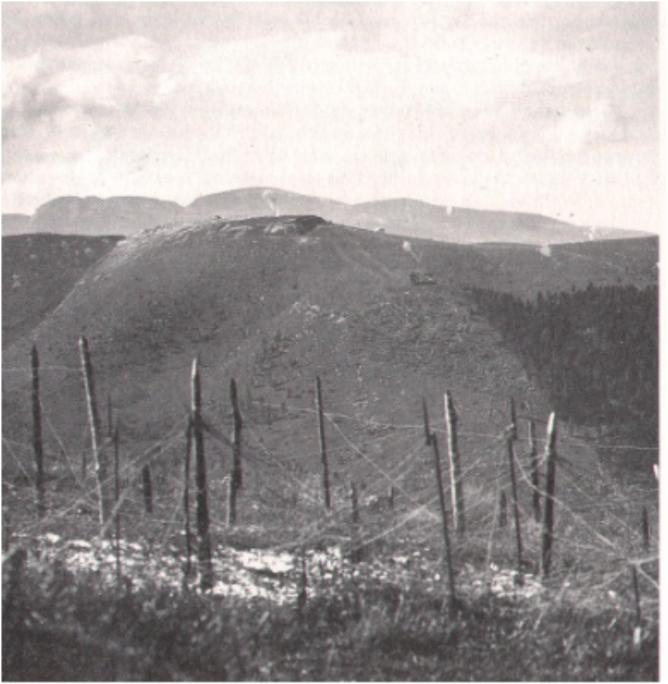
Fort Serrada under fire from Italian artillery batteries in May 1915.

At 4 am on May 25, 1915, a 28 cm gun on Monte Toraro fired at Serrada from a distance of 5.7 mi. From May to October 1915, the Italians fired 4,229 28 cm shells, by which Serrada was moderately damaged. However, the postern was destroyed on June 9, 1915. Despite the frequent shelling, the only shell holes in the fort were confined to the postern. The pre-armor of T.H. No. I was hit, but the shell was a dud. The dome of turret No. II was hit, but this only caused an 11-centimetre-deep dent. The rotating observation dome was hit and was inoperable for 4 days. Over the entire war, Serrada shot 26,103 10 cm shells. At the start of the shelling, the protection for the armored domes were placed outside the fort to deceive the Italians as to the location of the guns. Fort Serrada wasn't shelled as heavily as Forts Verle and Lusern, and did not incur as much damage because the massive 30.5 cm (12 in) mortars weren't used against it. The fort was also never attacked by Italian infantry.

== Post-war to today ==
In July 1931, the fort was used to test how to build sturdy fortifications that can withstand heavy artillery by the Italian Army. The findings were used in constructing the Alpine Wall, a series of fortifications built along the French, Swiss, Austrian, and Yugoslav borders. Despite the shelling in 1931, Fort Serrada was mostly intact because it wasn't shelled as intensely as Forts Lusern and Verle. In 1935 the fort was scrapped for steel using explosives, causing more damage than was suffered in the war. Despite this the fort was and is still in good condition and can be entered. The fort can be visited via cable car from Rifugio Biata Tonda on the Martinella, which is 5,300 ft above sea level.
