= Forte Verena =

Italian fortification in Northern Veneto, Italy

- Veneto, Italy
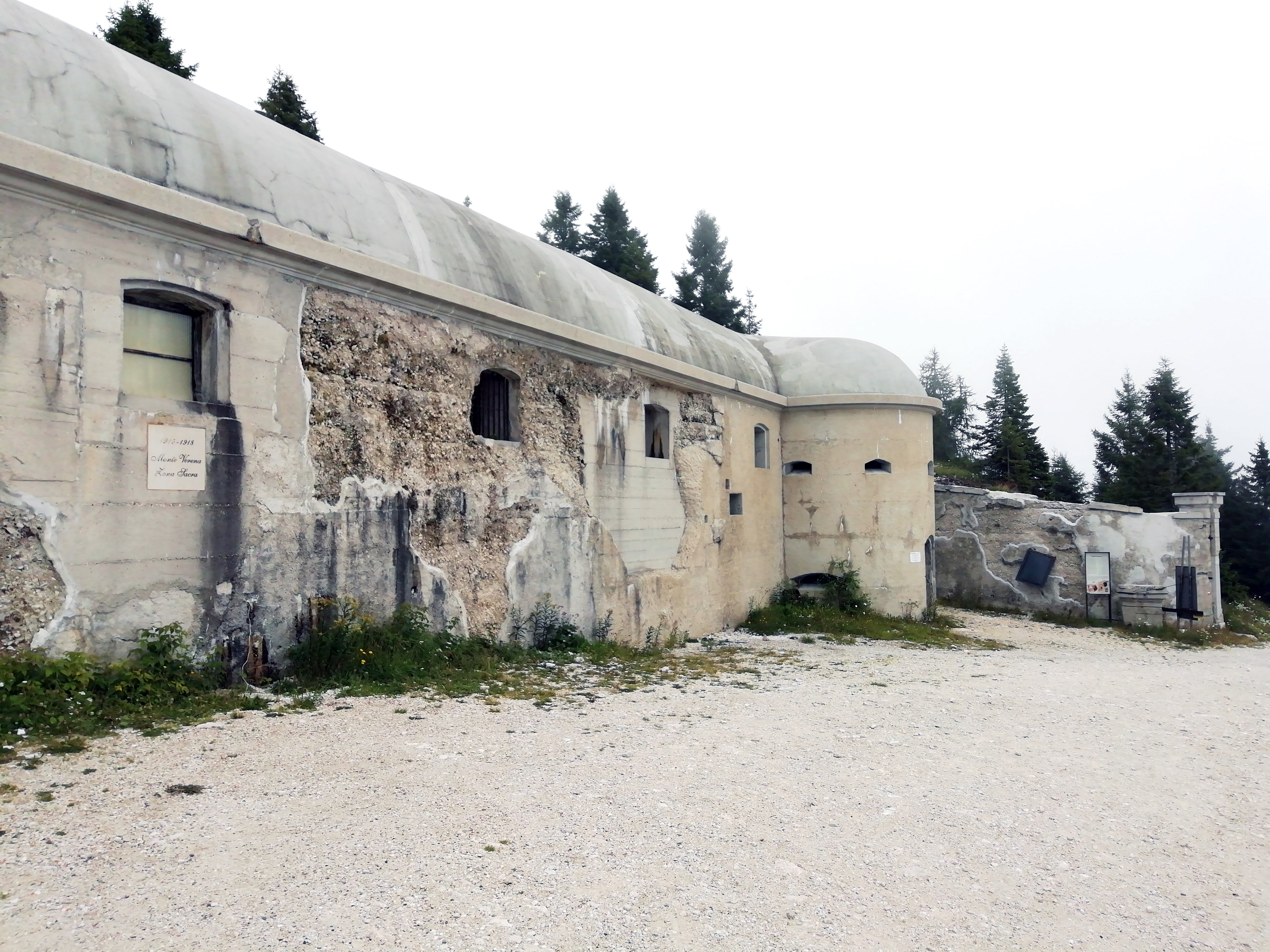
- View of Forte Verena today.

Location
- Coordinates: 45°55′50″N 11°24′47″E

Fort Verena (Italian: Forte Verena) was an Italian fortress built between 1910 and 1914 to defend the Italian border with the Austro-Hungarian Empire (along the border line that can currently be located between the province of Vicenza and Trentino) at an altitude of 2,019 metres (6,624 ft) on the summit of the mountain of the same name. The fortress is located in the municipal territory of Roana, and it overlooks the steep cliffs of the valley below, the Val d'Assa.

At 3:55 AM on May 24, 1915, the first two cannon shots were fired from Fort Verena at Fort Lusern by Italian forces, marking the entry of the Italian Royal Army into the war. On June 12, 1915, the fortress was hit and destroyed by a 305 mm Skoda shell that penetrated the structure and exploded inside. On May 22, 1916, during the Spring Offensive, the position was captured by Austro-Hungarian troops, who held it for the rest of the war.

== History ==
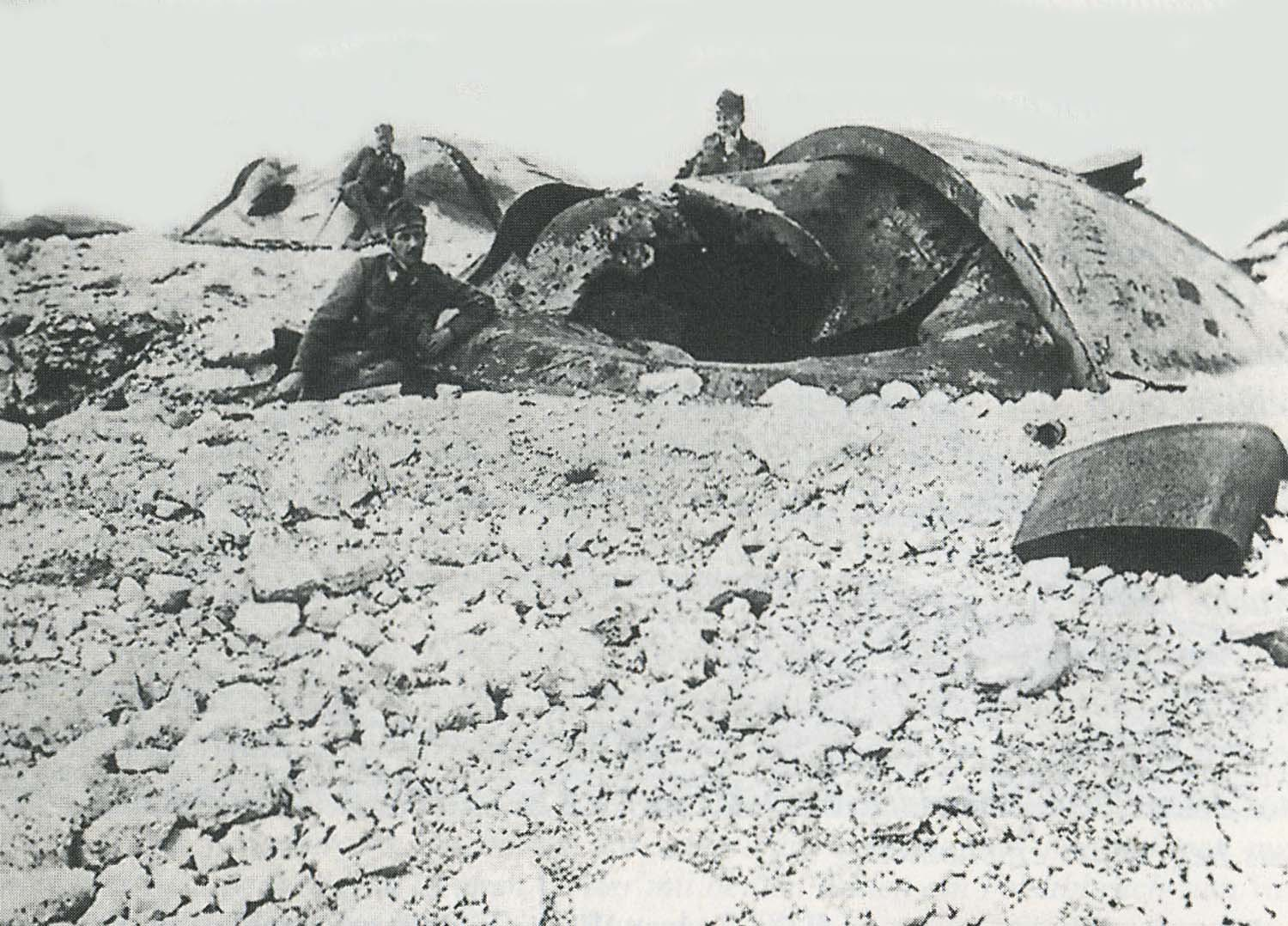
One of the domes that were destroyed

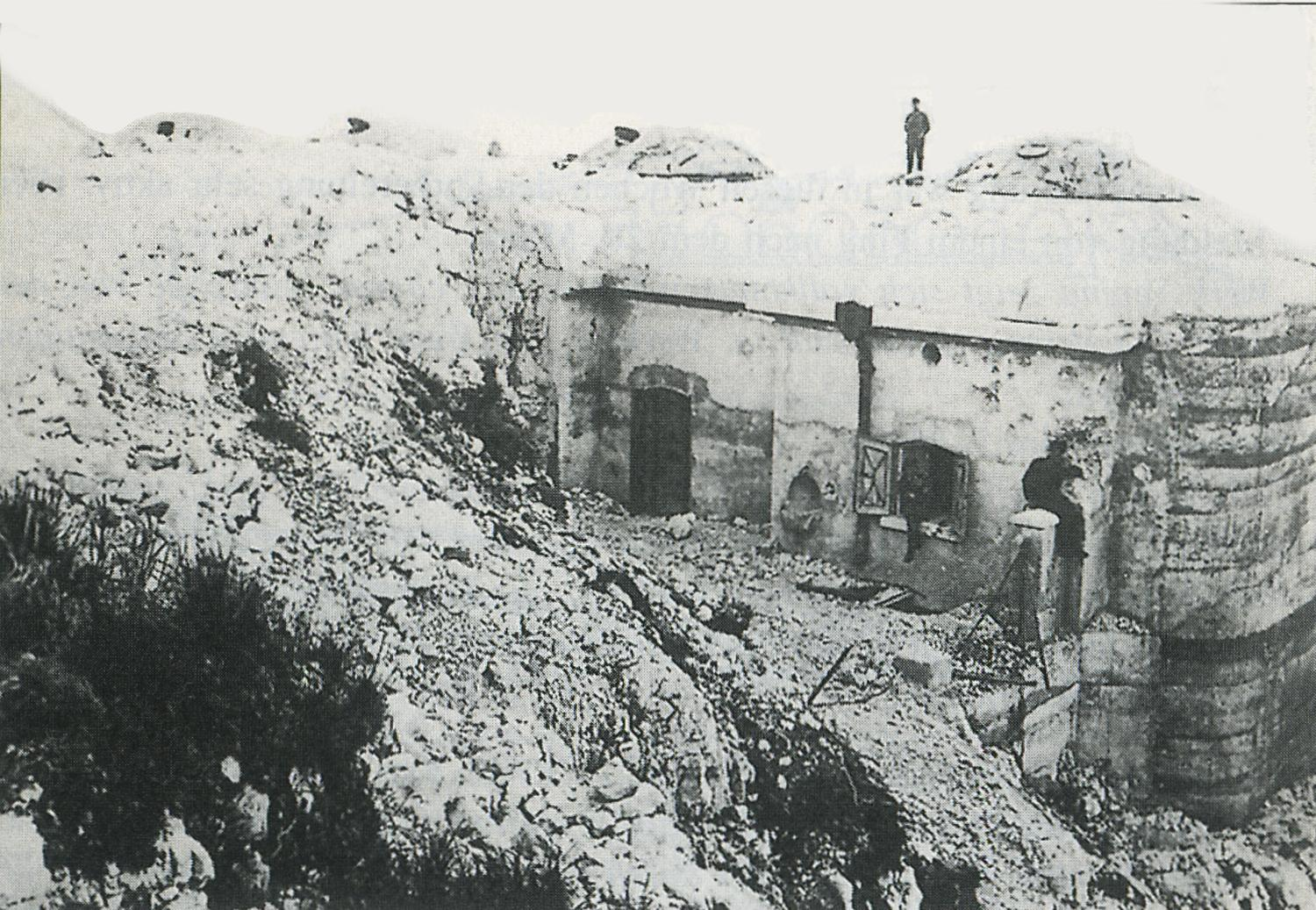
View of the remains of the fort

The structure was part of the Agno-Assa Barrier, Third Sector - Asiago; the construction itself appeared to be a strong and well-defended fortress, but in reality, it was built in a very short time with poor materials (for example, iron from wheelbarrows and cutlery was used as the metal to reinforce the cement of the fortress, leading to negative consequences for its sturdiness).

== The Great War ==
After marking the entry of the Royal Italian Army into the war, during the first two weeks of the conflict, Fort Verena, supported by a battery of 280 mm mortars placed on the nearby Civello peak, bombarded the Austro-Hungarian fortresses of Fort Verle, Fort Lusern, and Post Vezzena, causing significant damage. To eliminate this dangerous adversary – nicknamed the "dominant of the plateau" – the Austro-Hungarians prepared their Škoda 305 mm Vz. 1911 mortars, with 305 mm shells. On June 12, 1915, less than 20 days after the start of the conflict, a delayed-action 305 mm shell pierced the armor and exploded inside the powder magazine, killing Commander Umberto Trucchetti, two lieutenants, and 43 men. Photographic documents from the Austro-Hungarian Army (now preserved at the Austrian National Library in Vienna) attribute the destruction of the fortress to Battery 19, commanded by Hauptmann Bosse, stationed near Levico. Two plaques inside the fortress today commemorate the event. In the following days, two domes were destroyed, a third was blocked, and the casemates, barracks, and infirmary were hit and devastated. It was then decided to expose the cannons and use the fortress only as an observation post. In the post-war period, the Italian military command believed that the perforation of the armored dome was due to a crack in the covering. In reality, the fortress had been designed and built with consideration of the previous armament of Forts Verle and Lusern which consisted of 100 mm howitzers, unable to effectively reach the fortress. The entire defense design had been based on this armament, which was therefore inadequate against the new 305 mm mortars.

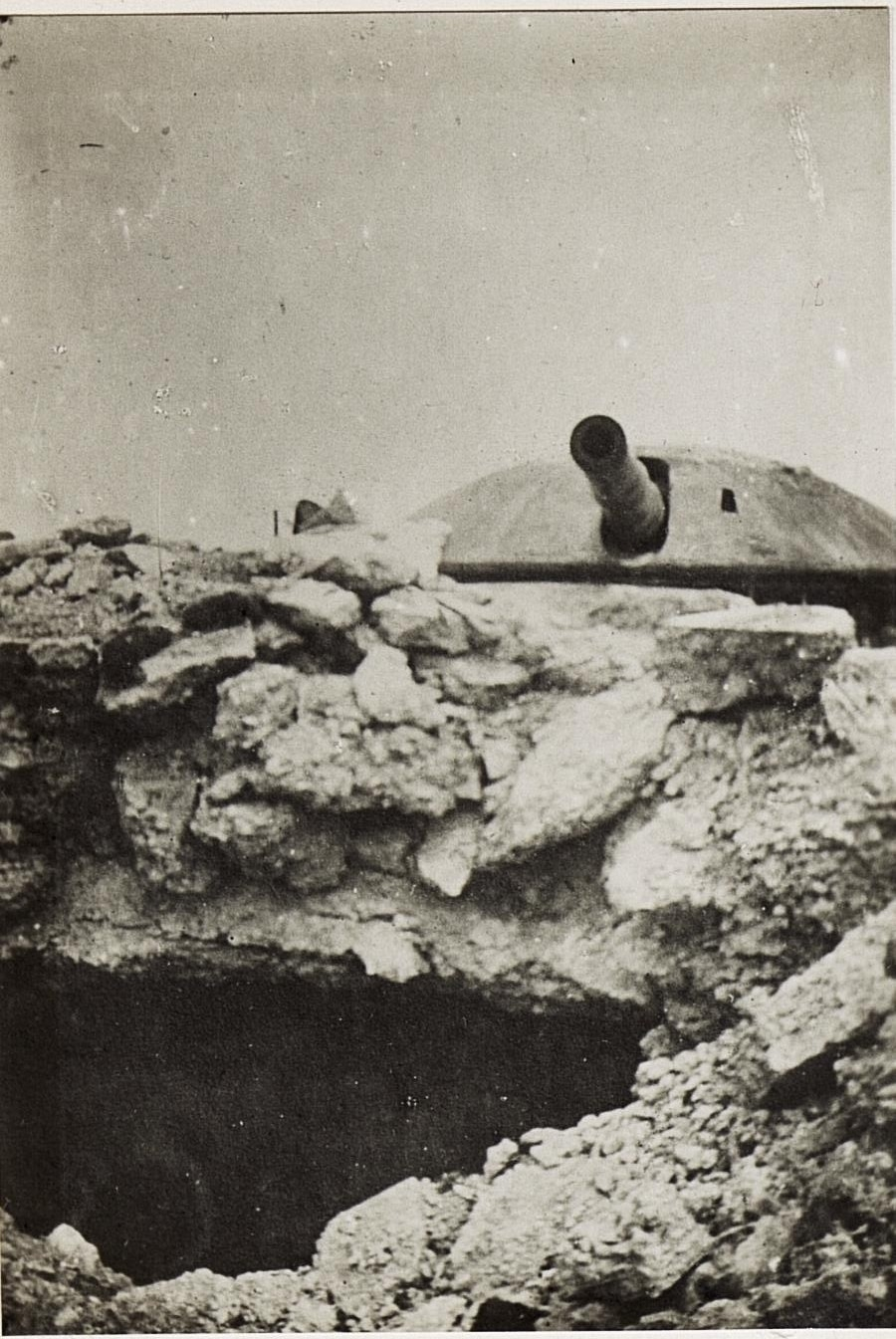
Damage to Fort Verena

On May 22, 1916, during the May Offensive, the fortress was occupied by Austro-Hungarian troops (who celebrated its capture by firing numerous tracer rounds), and it remained in their hands for the rest of the war. The armament consisted of four 149mm Schneider steel cannons in rotating armored domes 160mm thick (Schneider-type installation), and for close defense, four machine guns in casemates and two 75mm cannon batteries located nearby.

The thickness of the domes was just over half that of the enemy's domes: therefore, they were inadequate to withstand hits from large-caliber artillery.

The significant altitude at which the fortress was located, along with the open spaces in front of it, provided a considerable advantage for targeting visibility. However, this also made the artillery shells highly affected by strong wind gusts, which reduced their accuracy.

== Armor ==
At the time, the fortress had thick walls, which might have suggested intrinsic stability. However, the material used to build them was not reinforced concrete with iron beams (as used in the Austro-Hungarian forts of the plateaus), but a low-quality cement conglomerate mixed with rubble and other materials of poor mechanical value. This material made the thick walls lack mechanical resistance, but it gave them the required thickness according to the standards of the time. It was, therefore, a fortress built on a budget.
