= Lavarone =

Lavarone Lafraun
- Comune
- Comune di Lavarone
- Location within Italy Location within Trentino-Alto Adige/Südtirol
- Coordinates: 45°56′N 11°16′E
- Country: Italy
- Region: Trentino-Alto Adige/Südtirol
- Province: Trentino (TN)
- Frazioni: Chiesa, Cappella, Gionghi, Masetti, Villanova, Longhi, Magrè, Slaghenaufi, Bertoldi, Nicolussi, Piccoli, Oseli, Gasperi, Lanzino, Albertini, Rocchetti, Malga Laghetto, Stengheli, Azzolini, Masi di Sotto

Government
  - Mayor: Claudio Stenghele (Civic List)

Area
  - Total: 26.3 km^{2} (10.2 sq mi)
- Elevation: 1,200 m (3,900 ft)

Population (2026)
  - Total: 1,205
  - Density: 45.8/km^{2} (119/sq mi)
- Demonym: Lavaronesi
- Time zone: UTC+1 (CET)
  - Summer (DST): UTC+2 (CEST)
- Postal code: 38040
- Dialing code: 0464
- ISTAT code: 022102
- Patron saint: Saint Florian
- Website: Official website

Lavarone (in the local dialect Lavaronese "Lavarón", in Cimbrian "Lavròu", in German, outdated "Lafraun") is an Italian municipality with 1,194 inhabitants in the autonomous province of Trento. It is part of the "Magnifica Comunità degli Altipiani Cimbri," whose administrative seat is in the Gionghi district. Historically, the municipality of Lavarone has friendly ties with the Austrian town of Braunau am Inn and the Italian town of Prato.

== Geography ==
The municipality of Lavarone is located on the plateau of the same name in the province of Trento at about 1,200 meters above sea level. It borders the municipalities of Caldonazzo, Folgaria, Luserna, and to the south, the province of Vicenza. The municipality includes 19 different settlements and belongs to the "Magnifica Comunità degli Altipiani Cimbri."

== Lago di Lavarone ==
Within the municipality, there is a small lake, which Sigmund Freud often visited when he spent his holidays in Lavarone in 1904, 1906, 1907, and 1923. In the summer, the lake is suitable for swimming, and in the winter, it can be used for ice skating. Since 1985, a course on ice rescue techniques has been held annually by the ANIS (National Diving Instructors Association).

== Origin of the Name ==
The name Lavarone could have several origins. Some theories suggest it comes from a pre-Celtic or Roman origin, possibly from "làvara," meaning "flat stone slab." Another theory links it to the Latin term "fossa luparia" ("wolf trap"), from which "lovèra" and "lovàra" could have evolved. Other suggestions include an origin from "lappa" (rag) or from the Celtic root "lab" ("flooded"). There is also a theory that the name derives from "Liebefrau," related to a legend about the lake's origin.

== History ==
The first signs of human settlement in the area come from old smelting furnaces and debris found in the Millegrobbe area. There are unconfirmed theories that the region was inhabited as early as the 19th century B.C.

The first written mention of Lavarone dates back to 1184 in a papal document, where Pope Lucius III placed the possessions of the Bishop of Feltre under his protection. During the Roman, Frankish, and Lombard occupations, Lavarone was part of the Roman province and later the border of the Holy Roman Empire.

== The Cimbrian Colonization ==
In the 12th and 13th centuries, Bavarian settlers arrived in the region. These colonists were mainly engaged in coal production and timber harvesting and lived in scattered settlements, which shaped the urban development of the area. Many settlers spoke German, which is still reflected in many place names today.

== World War I ==
Lavarone's strategic location on the border made it an important military point during World War I. The region was turned into a system of fortifications, connected to nearby forts in Folgaria. Remains from this period, such as the "Forte Belvedere Gschwent," are now preserved as museums.

== Symbolism ==
Lavarone's coat of arms was officially recognized on May 19, 1930. It consists of two fields: in the first, a silver "M" on a red background; in the second, a wavy line in silver and green.

== Monuments and Sights ==
Religious buildings include:

The Church of San Floriano in Chiesa The Church of Santa Maria Assunta in Cappella The Church of Madonna della Salette in Piccoli The Church of Madonna Pellegrina in Slaghenaufi

== Society ==
The population of Lavarone is predominantly Italian-speaking, but there is still a small percentage of Cimbrian speakers, a German dialect.

== Economy ==
The economy of Lavarone is primarily based on summer and winter tourism. The area offers about 10,000 overnight accommodations, including hotels, residences, and private apartments. Agriculture, particularly cheese production, also plays an important role, with the "Vezzena" cheese holding a protected designation of origin (PDO).

== Sports ==
Lavarone offers a variety of recreational activities in the summer, such as hiking and mountain biking, especially along the old wartime lines. In the winter, there is a large ski area, the Lavarone Ski Center, known for alpine skiing and snowboarding activities. The area features numerous slopes and a snowpark for snowboarders.

== Demographic evolution ==
Historical population

Year	Pop.	±%
1861	?	—
1871	?	—
1881	?	—
1901	?	—
1911	?	—

Year	Pop.	±%
1921	1,664	—
1931	1,558	−6.4%
1936	1,478	−5.1%
1951	1,468	−0.7%
1961	1,320	−10.1%

Year	Pop.	±%
1971	1,178	−10.8%
1981	1,151	−2.3%
1991	1,092	−5.1%
2001	1,084	−0.7%

Source: Data from ISTAT
