= White War =

High-altitude mountain warfare in the Italian front of World War I

- Part of Italian front (World War I)
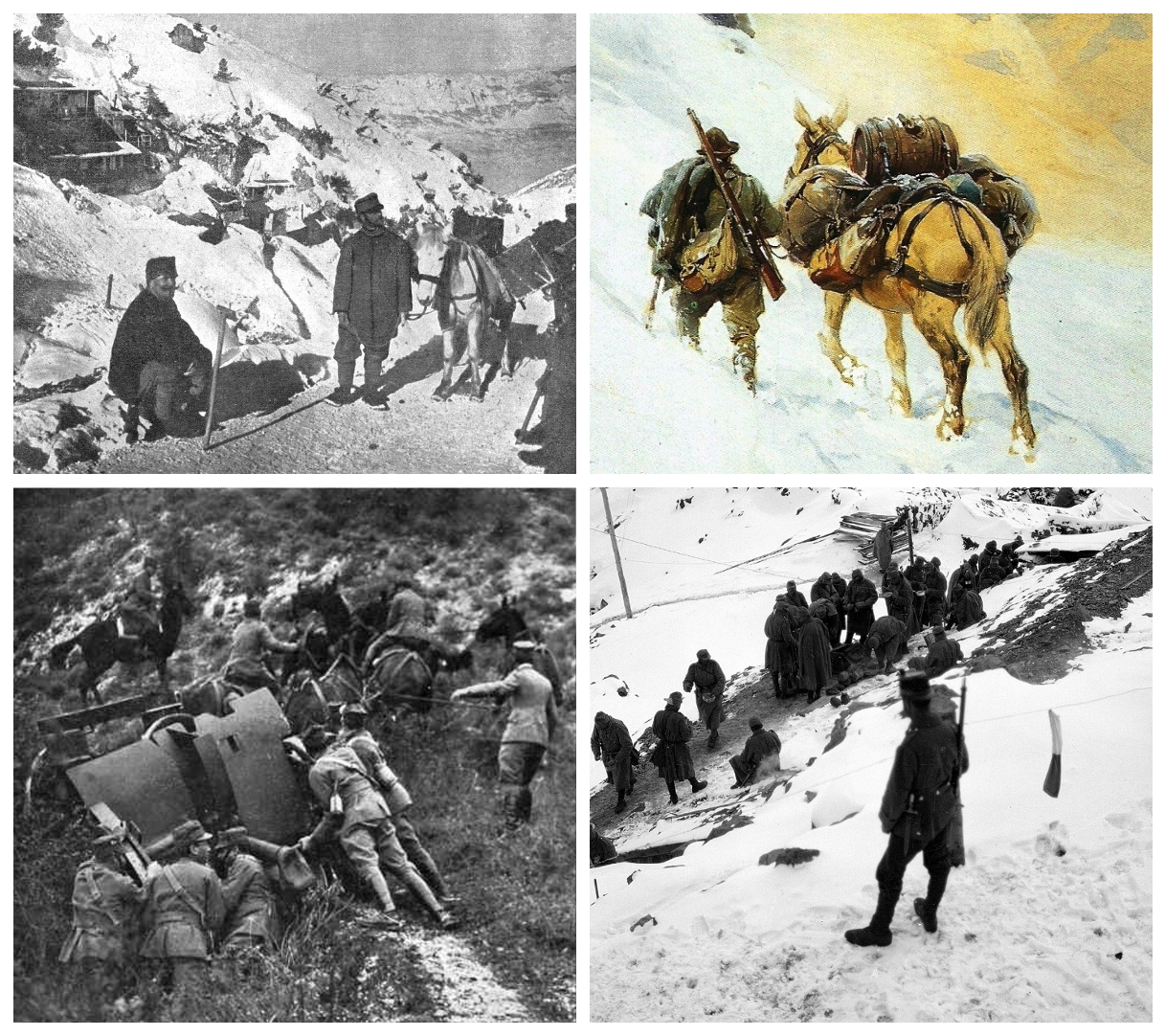
- Clockwise from above: Austrian barracks in East Tyrol; Alpine with Mule painting by Achille Beltrame from 1916; Austrian infantrymen waiting for the ration in the sector of Dreisprachenspitze; difficult transport of an Italian artillery piece at high altitude
Date	May 24, 1915 – November 4, 1918
Location	Southern Rhaetian Alps, Dolomites
Result	Italian victory

Belligerents
Italy	Austria-Hungary; Germany

Commanders and leaders
(Kingdom of Italy) Luigi Cadorna (Kingdom of Italy) Armando Diaz	(Austria-Hungary) Conrad von Hötzendorf (Austria-Hungary) Arz von Straußenburg

Strength
Two armies for about 100,000–120,000 men	April 1915: about 32,400 Austro-Hungarians defending the Tyrol + 13 battalions of the German Alpenkorps arrived on May 26, 1915

Casualties and losses
- c. 150,000–180,000 overall deaths, only one third of which were caused by combat

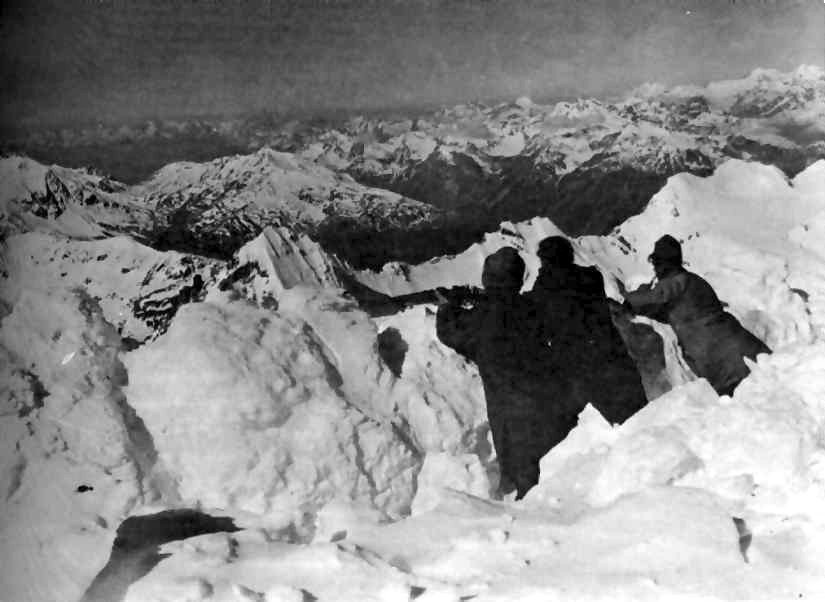
Austro-Hungarian trench at the peak of Ortler, the highest trench in the First World War (3,850 m (12,630 ft))

The White War (Italian: Guerra Bianca, German: Gebirgskrieg, Hungarian: Fehér Háború) is the name given to the fighting in the high-altitude Alpine sector of the Italian front during the First World War, principally in the Dolomites, the Ortles-Cevedale Alps and the Adamello-Presanella Alps. More than two-thirds of this conflict zone lies at an altitude above 2,000 m (6,600 ft)), rising to 3,905 m (12,812 ft) at Mount Ortler. In 1917 New York World correspondent E. Alexander Powell wrote: "On no front, not on the sun-scorched plains of Mesopotamia, nor in the frozen Mazurian marshes, nor in the blood-soaked mud of Flanders, does the fighting man lead so arduous an existence as up here on the roof of the world."

== Geography of the front ==
=== The front line ===
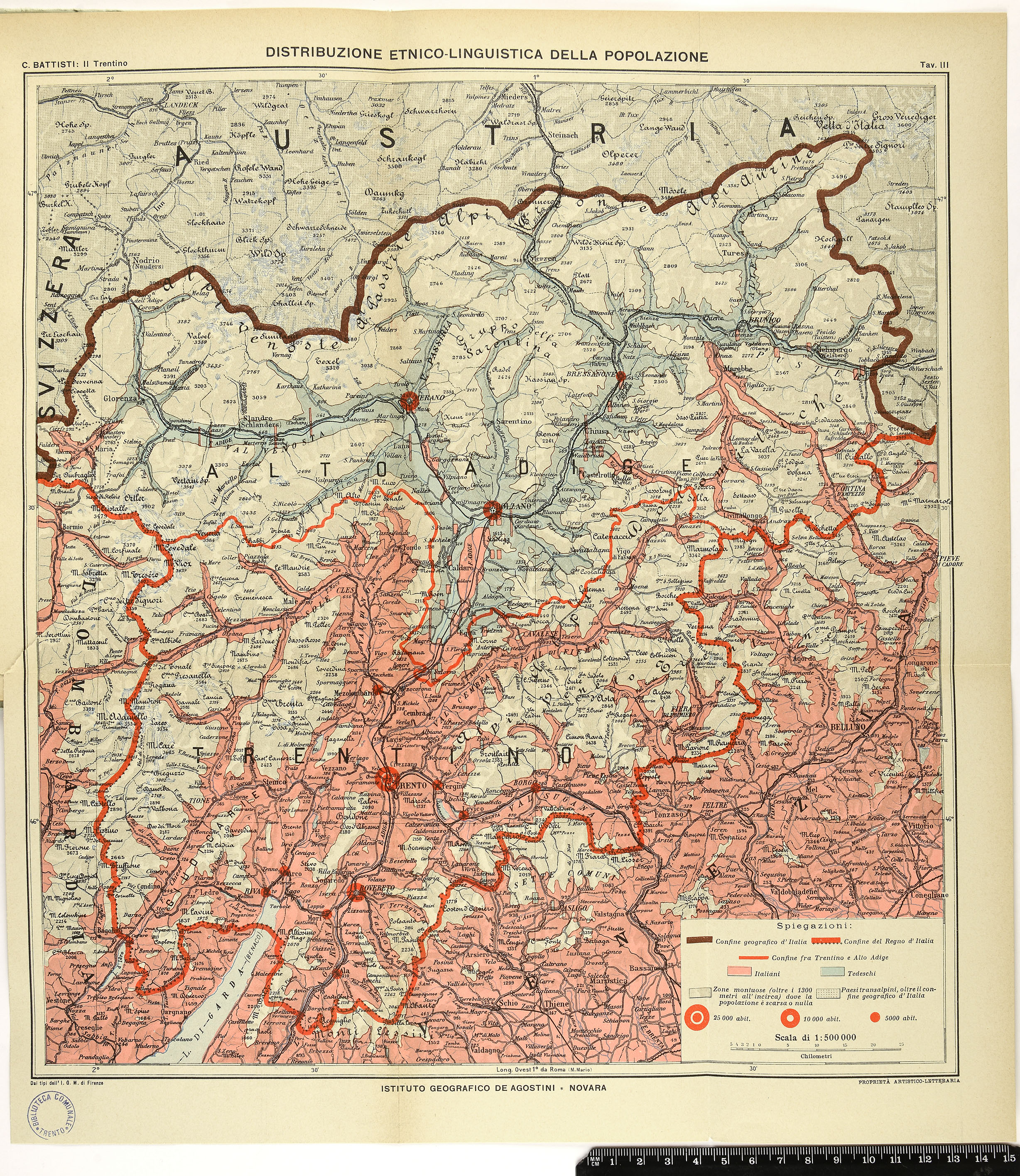
Map showing the border as it ran through the various mountain peaks

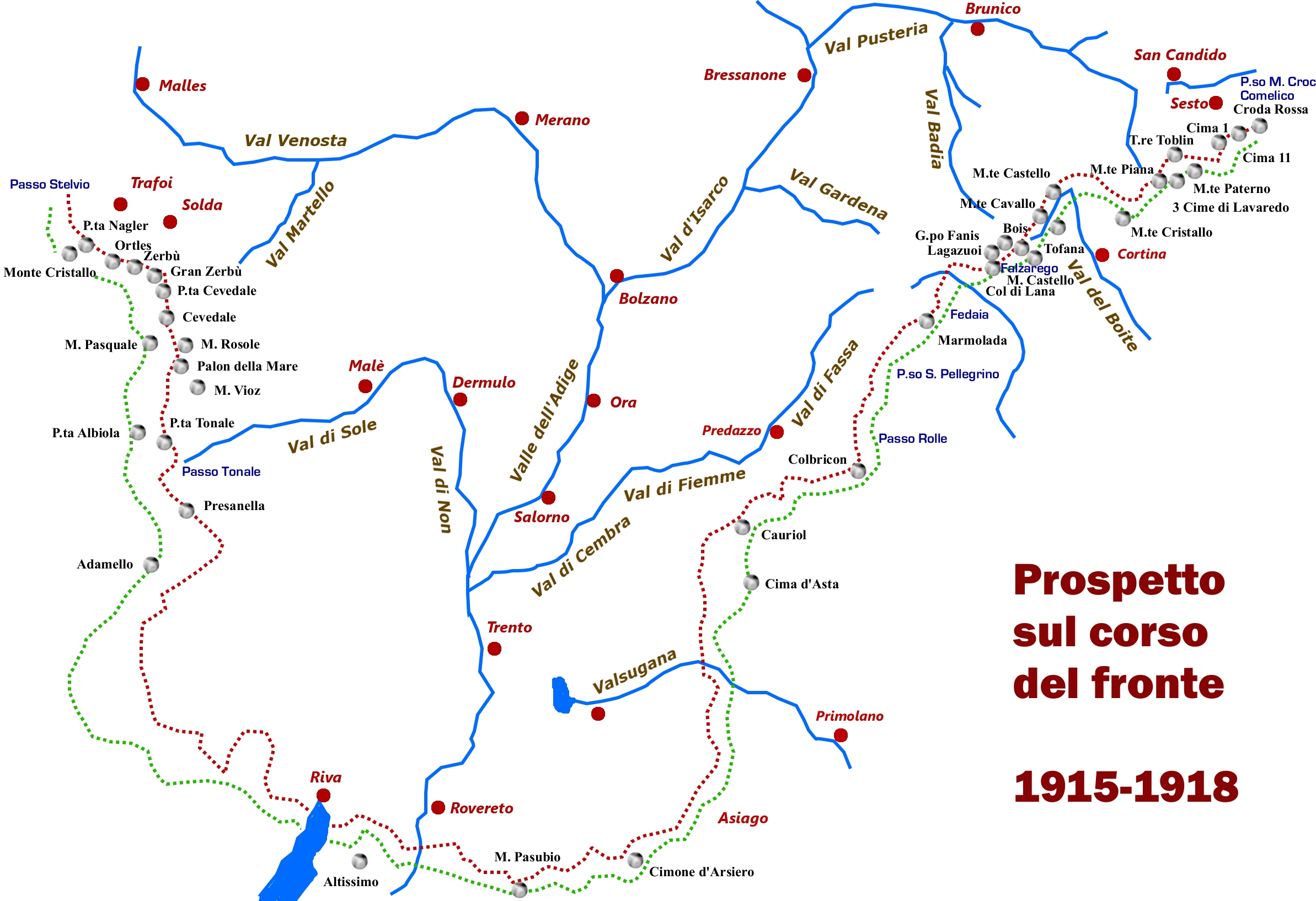
Alpine front, 1915–1917

At the outbreak of the war, the border between Italy and Austria-Hungary was as determined at the Treaty of Vienna (1866) at the conclusion of the Third Italian War of Independence. One section along this border, the Trentino, offered major advantages to Austria-Hungary. Extending southwards towards the River Po, it potentially allowed Austro-Hungarian forces to strike towards the lower Adige and Mincio, cutting off Veneto and Friuli-Venezia from the rest of Italy. Another section, much smaller, favoured Italy around the Kreuzberg Pass and the headwaters of the Drava. In practical terms however, the road and rail systems did not allow the Italian commander Luigi Cadorna to mass his forces here, so instead he concentrated on the Isonzo front further east, where he hoped to make a decisive breakthrough.

From Bovec on the upper Isonzo to the Swiss border at the Stelvio Pass stretched around 400 km of border at an altitude above 2,000m. Halfway along this border, between the Trentino and the Kreuzberg, rose the Dolomites, that offered little strategic advantage to either side. Between Switzerland and Lake Garda the Ortler, and the Adamello-Presanella Alps controlled the Stelvio Pass and the Tonale Pass. From here the Austro-Hungarians could have broken through to threaten the industrial cities of Lombardy, while the Italians could have penetrated deep into the Tyrol. In fact, neither side developed major plans for this sector; once the passes were closed, both sides maintained a static posture.

=== Logistical challenges ===
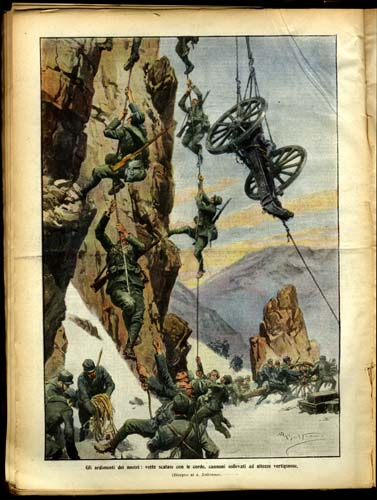
Italian soldiers haul their cannon up a mountainside

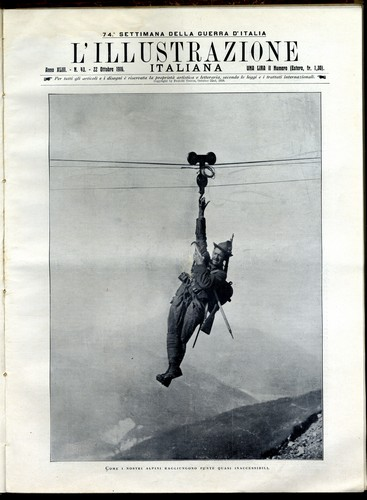
Italian soldier using a cableway to reach extreme positions

The major challenge for both armies was to sustain modern warfare in such a hostile environment. The difficult terrain meant supplies had to be brought up on the backs of pack animals or of the men themselves, including heavy artillery and munitions. As the conflict developed a network of roads, mule tracks and pathways was established, reaching even the most remote places. Eventually, cableways were built too, and this building work itself was difficult, dangerous and exhausting.

In the High Alps, temperatures vary widely: above 2,500 meters, temperatures below zero are normal even in summer. In winter, during the war, temperatures as low as -35° were recorded. All year round the weather can change rapidly and storms are common. Finally, the winters of 1916 and 1917 brought some of the heaviest snows of the century, with the mountainsides often under 8 metres of snow, three times the annual average. This made it extremely difficult for the troops to stay at high altitudes, forcing the men to continually dig and clear the snow because of the risk of avalanches. Heinz Lichem von Löwenbourg stated: "On the basis of unanimous reports from fighters of all nations, the rough rule applies that in 1915–1918, on the mountain front, two thirds of the dead were victims of the elements (avalanches, frostbite, landslides, cold, exhaustion) and only one third victims of direct military action."

Servicing the troops on the front line required enormous manpower. To maintain a garrison of 100 men on a 3,000m peak, 900 porters were required, working in relays.

== Military forces ==
=== Kingdom of Italy ===
On the western edge of the front, deployed from the Stelvio Pass to the Cereda Pass, Italy positioned the 1st Army under General Roberto Brusati based in Verona, spread over an arc roughly 200 km long as the crow flies or about 300 km on the ground. The III and V Corps were deployed under the command of Generals Camerana and Aliprindi, and mixed with the troops of the fortress of Verona, under the command of General Gobbo. The III Corps occupied the western side of the Trentino salient, from Stelvio to Lake Garda. The 6th Division was deployed on the border while the 5th was the reserve of the III Corps. To the south, between Garda and the Lessinico plateau, were the troops of the fortress of Verona, while the V Corps with the 9th, 34th and 15th divisions was positioned at the Passo Tre Croci and the Cereda Pass, defending the Trentino salient with the 35th Reserve Division near Brescia.

The 4th Army was deployed on the Dolomites sector under General Luigi Nava, based in Vittorio Veneto, which its forces from the Cereda Pass to Mount Peralba, over about 75 km as the crow flies, and about double the distance on the ground. The Cordevole sector, between the Pale di San Martino and the Rocchetta di Pelmo, was garrisoned by the IX Corps under the command of General Marini with the 17th and 18th Divisions serving on the front or in reserve. The Cadore sector, between the Valle del Boite and the sources of the Piave, came under I Corps of General Ottavio Ragni, with the 2nd and 10th Divisions deployed close to the border and the 1st Division in reserve. Unlike the Cordevole sector, however, the troops of the Cadore sector could count on the substantial fixed defenses of the Cadore-Maè Fortress.

=== Austro-Hungarian Empire ===
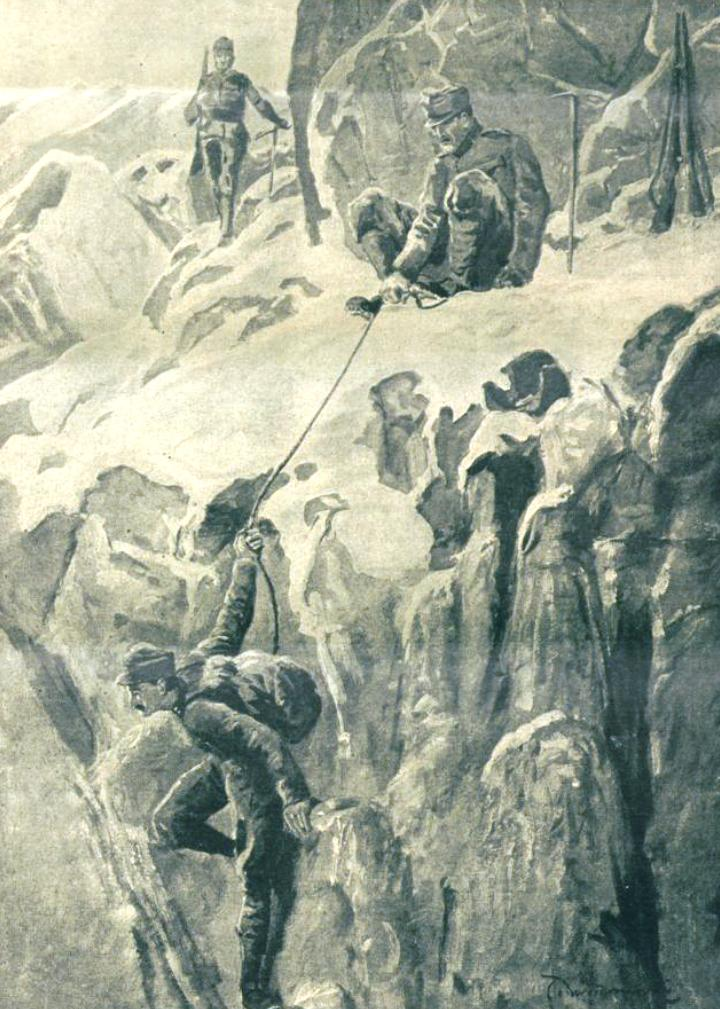
An Austrian patrol in the highest mountains of the Tyrol

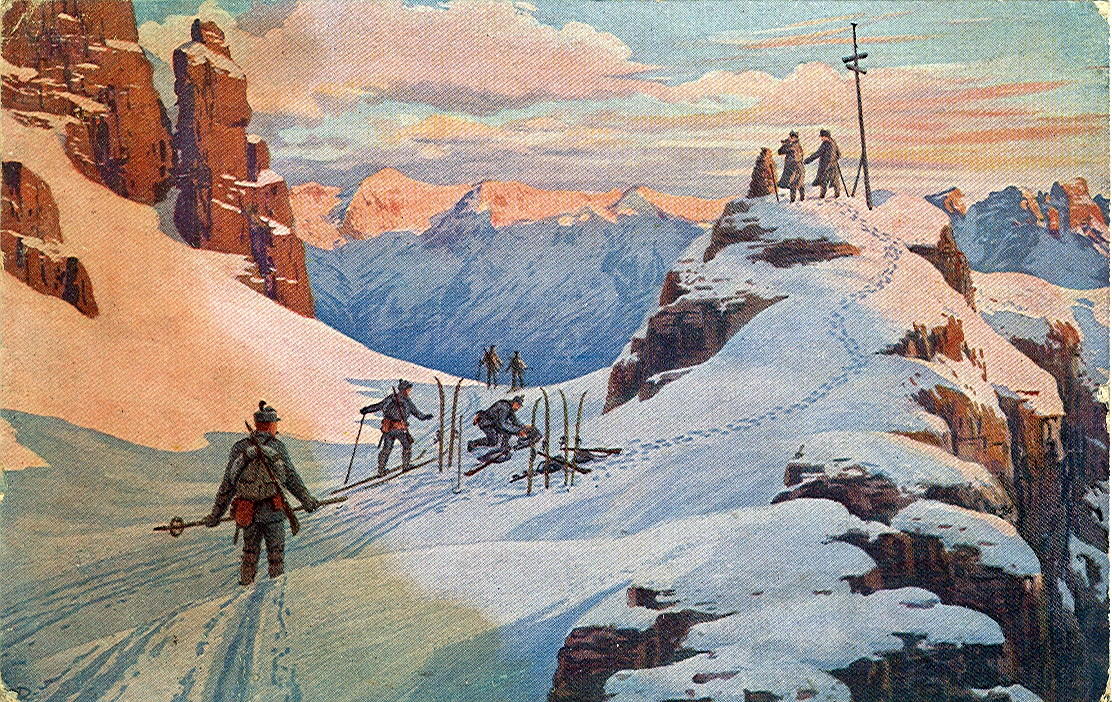
The war in the Tyrol

On the Austro-Hungarian side, General Viktor Dankl von Krasnik took command of the defense of Tyrol at the start of hostilities, based in Innsbruck. His field of operations stretched from the Stelvio Pass to the Croda Nera, located on the Carnic watershed just a little east of Forcella Dignas. This meant it was roughly facing the 1st and 4th Italian Armies. The region was divided into five sectors, called ‘rayons’. part of General Scholz's 90th Division, composed of eleven battalions, was assigned to sectors I and II, from the Stelvio to Presèna, with support from the fort at Gomagoi on the Stelvio route and modern artillery placed to defend the Passo del Tonale.

The III sector ran from the Adamello to the Pale di San Martino, and was the responsibility of the 91st Division made up of about thirty battalions, under the General Können-Horack, while one brigade controlled the garrison of the strongholds of Riva del Garda and Trento under General Guseck. This defensive system around Trento was of great strategic importance, and was divided into four sub-sectors, Lodaro, Lavarone, Rovereto and Pergine Valsugana, which had modern fortifications and various defensive works. The IV sector, from the Pale di San Martino to Mount Padonit was held by the 90th Division, with a mountain brigade of seven battalions. The V sector, from Mount Padon to the Croda Nera, was held by a mountain brigade of nine battalions. The massing of the Italian 4th Army meant that on May 27 this sector was removed from the 90th Division and made partially autonomous under the command of General Ludwig Goiginger and with three reinforcing battalions until the arrival of the German Alpenkorps, whose commander Konrad Krafft von Dellmensingen assumed command of the Tyrol and the responsibility of the IV and V sectors. He retained this until 14 October, when, having withdrawn the Alpenkorps from Alto Adige, he handed over to General Roth von Limanowa.

=== Balance of forces ===
Despite their numerical superiority, the Italian forces did not take the offensive on this front. The Italian commanders lacked intelligence about the strength of Austro-Hungarian numbers, had no detailed plans for a campaign and were also risk-averse.

The Austro-Hungarians were equally unprepared to take the offensive. In the decades before the war resources had been directed mainly to Galicia on the Russian front, and in 1915 the objective was simply to hold off any Italian invasion. As chief of staff, Conrad had also neglected the defence of the Dolomites in favor of a strengthening his position on the Asiago plateau, as a base from which to attack the Veneto. As a result, the defences that opposed the Italian 4th Army were second-rate compared to those of Trentino. In the first days of the war, instead of trying to maintain old strongholds Commander Goiginger had his men retreat and distributed the artillery around the surrounding mountains. By spreading their guns over isolated positions on the slopes and peaks, the Austrians exploited the Dolomite terrain very effectively, securing every possible advantage in an attempt to confine the Italians to the lower valleys and prevent them from accessing the strategic passes.

=== Fortifications ===
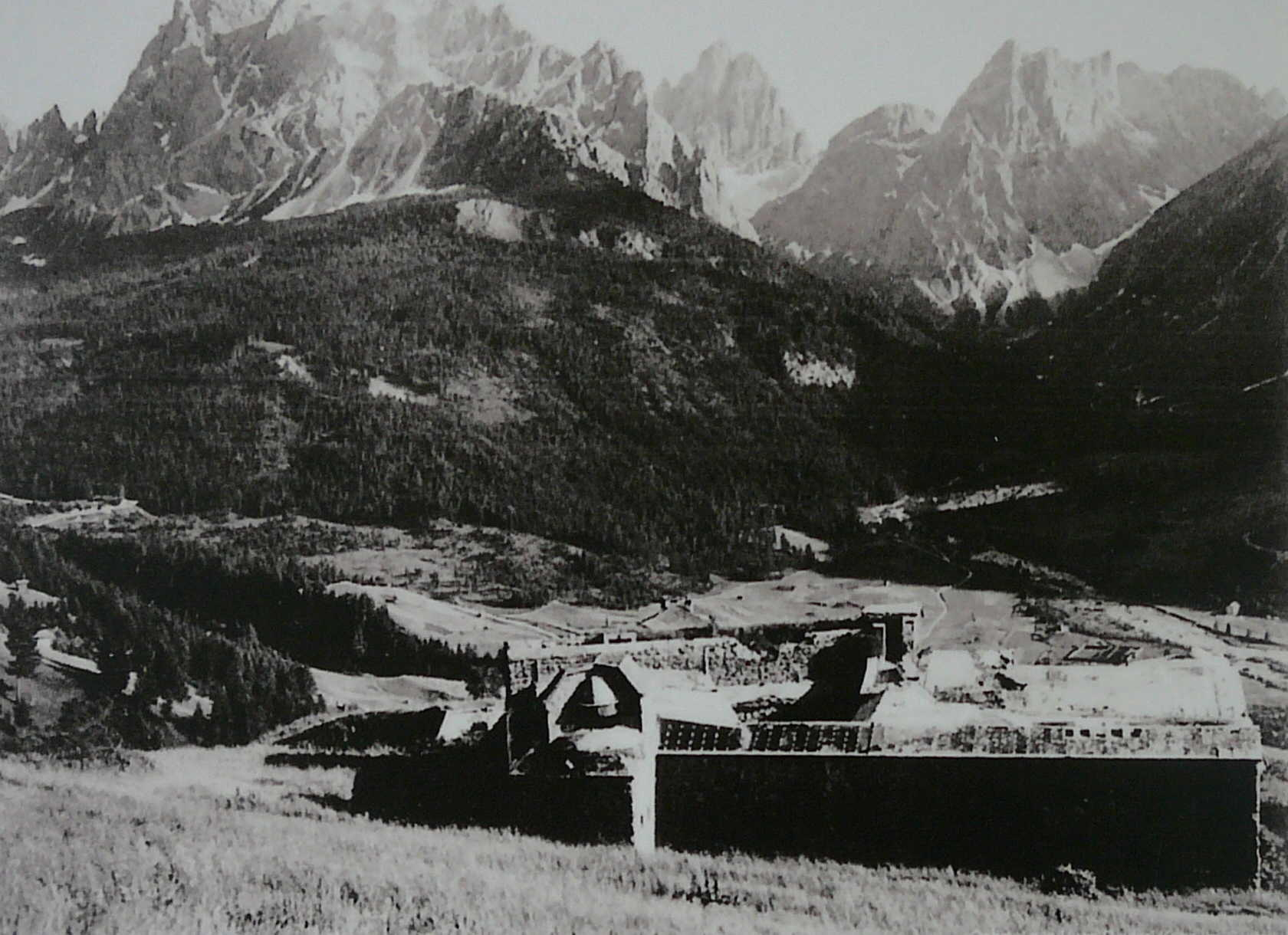
The Austrian fortress of Mitterberg near Sexten/Sesto

The peacetime defence doctrine of Austria-Hungary assumed that not an inch of land was to be conceded to an invader, and on this basis fortifications had been built up right on the border itself. However at the beginning of the hostilities the Austrians did not have sufficient forces to be able to maintain them. They therefore withdrew to defensive positions behind the border that gave them the advantage of high ground wherever possible and shortened their defensive lines from around 500 km to about 400 km. In contrast the Italians followed the practice of locating their fortifications well behind the border, meaning they had no role in the fighting in the Dolomites. An Austrian advance near Agordo would have been met at the fort of Listolade, while the Cadore was defended by the Chiusa di Venàs and the fort of Monte Rite, as well as by numerous concealed artillery positions. On the Austrian side, Ampezzo and the Cadore Dolomites area were defended by the Prato Piazza (Plätzwiese works) and Landro, which had been complemented with modern structures in the surrounding area (Col Rosson, Alpe di Specie, Col di Specie, Rautkofel). The forts of Haideck and Mitterberg (monte di Mezzo) in val di Sesto were intended to prevent any descent from the Monte Croce di Comelico pass towards Val Pusteria but they had not been modernised. To make up for this, Mount Dentro di Sesto was used as a fixed location for large calibre artillery.

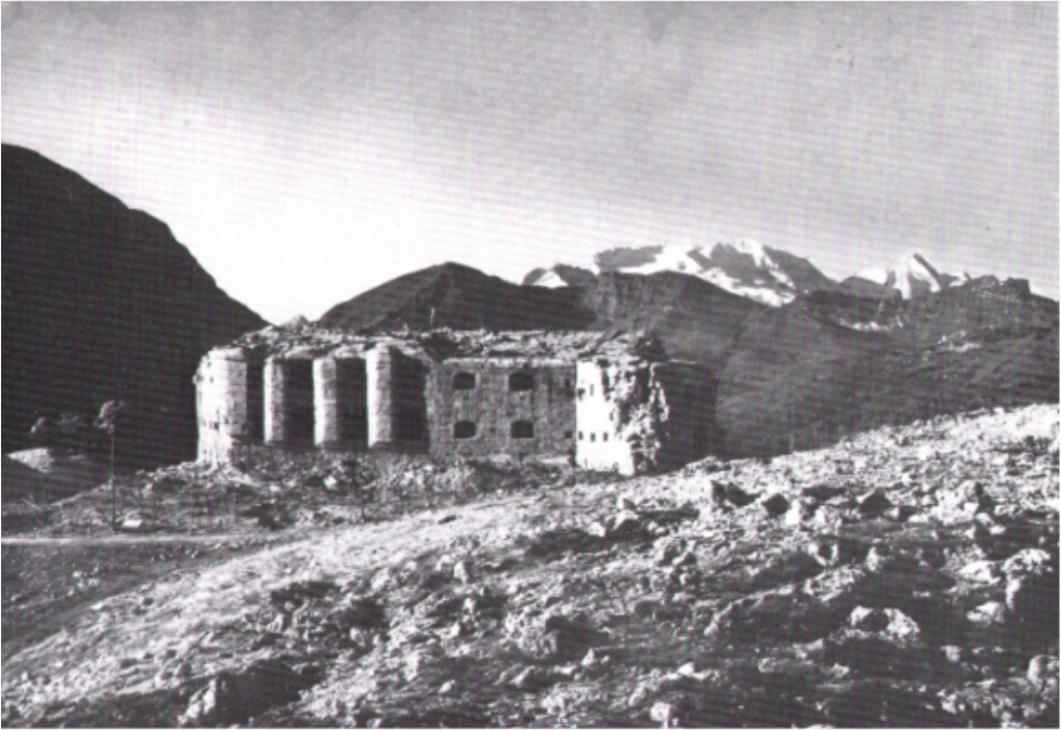
Forte Tre Sassi in 1916, half-destroyed by Italian artillery

The pass between the Ampezzo basin and the Val Badia was controlled by Forte Tre Sassi on the stony ground of the Valparola Pass, while the Livinallongo del Col di Lana was blocked upstream of Pieve by Forte Corte and Ruaz roadblock. Finally, near Moena stood Forte Someda, guarding the Fassa Valley and the mouth of the San Pellegrino valley, a few kilometres from the front. All these forts were of modest size, much less impressive than the large fortresses on the Trentino highlands and in the Adige valley. At the beginning of the war they were partially decommissioned because they were outdated and inadequate to resist modern artillery. Their guns were moved to more favourable positions less detectable by the enemy; the buildings were highly visible and at times the Austro-Hungarians continued to pretend that they were occupied in order to divert Italian fire towards useless targets.

Both armies, from the beginning of the conflict, began the constant work of excavating caves, tunnels, trenches, walkways, shelters and underground depots, which led to the creation of entire underground towns relatively safe from enemy fire. Monte Piana and Col di Lana were notable examples of such structures, with impressive defensive systems. Other examples can be found at the Sass de Stria with its tunnels and trenches, and Lagazuoi, more excavated than any other mountain in the Dolomites; within it, a bloody battle was fought with mines.

== The Dolomites sector ==
=== Conca d'Ampezzo and Som Pouses ===
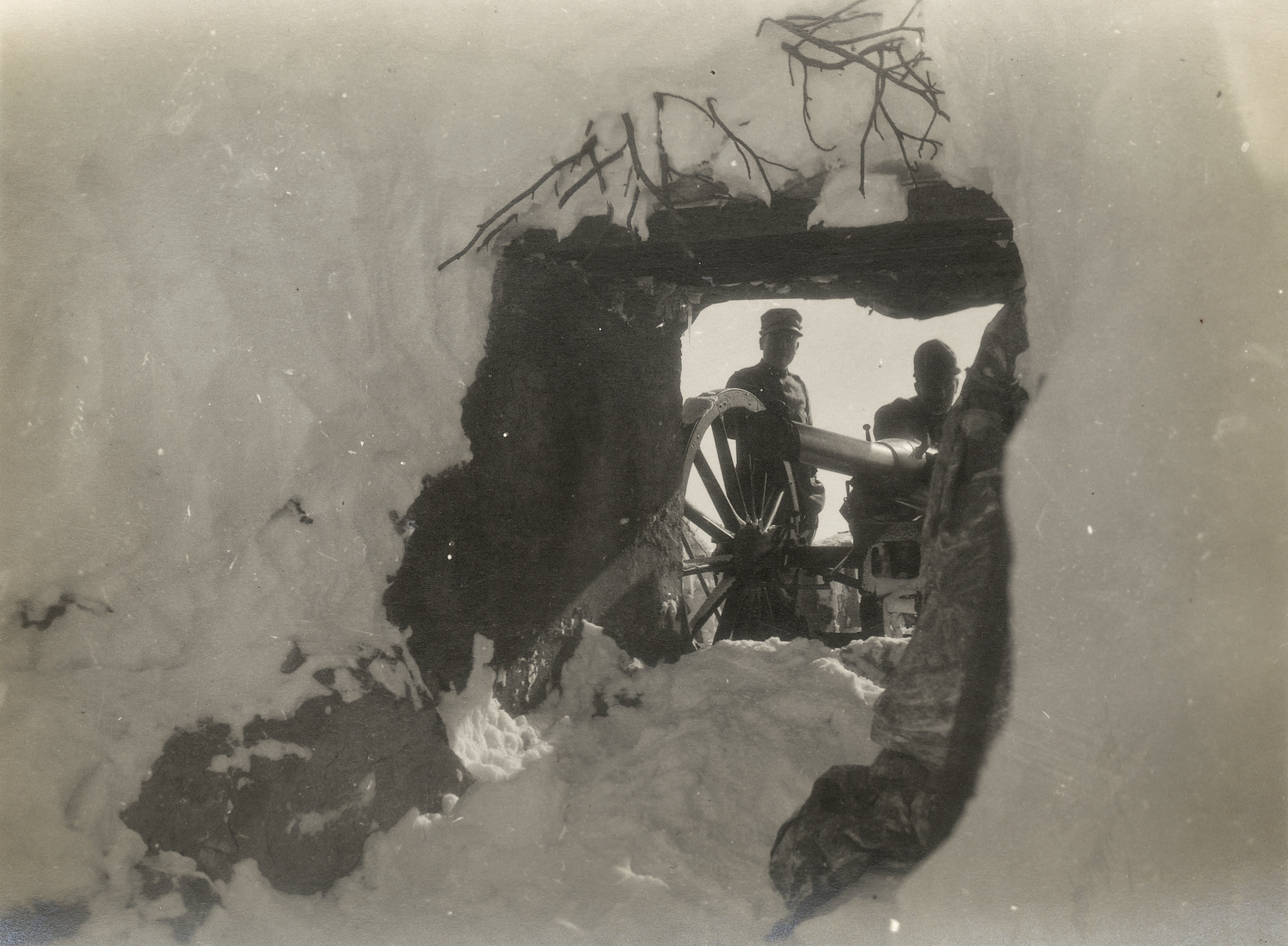
Soldiers maneuver a cannon in the snow

The war reached Cortina d'Ampezzo on July 31, 1914 with the conscription of men between 21 and 42 into the armed forces of Austria-Hungary. In November of the same year twenty-year-olds were also called up, and in May 1915, when Italy also entered the conflict, the draft was extended to men aged up to 50. Ladin speakers, Italian speakers from Trentino and German speakers from Tyrol were grouped into three regiments of Landesschützen and four of Kaiserjäger, hurriedly transferred to the Eastern Front.

On the eve of the hostilities, General Nava, commander of the Italian 4th Army, ordered that the first objectives on the Cadore front were: taking of possession of the entire massif of Monte Piana and the Cortina d'Ampezzo basin, both in the operational area of the 1st Army Corps of General Ragni.

In Cortina the gendarmes, the financial police, the few Standschützen present and the elderly or veterans repatriated for illness or injuries, retreated behind Som Pouses to reinforce the defences that closed the Conca to the north. Although he had declared taking the Conca d'Ampezzo as his priority, General Nava, worried about strong resistance and ambushes from the woods, delayed in issuing orders, advising the commanders of the army corps to operate with great caution; so May 24 passed quietly. Only a few Italian exploratory patrols crossed the border, reaching Passo Tre Croci and the Cinque Torri without encountering the enemy, and only on 27 May did a patrol descend to Cortina, finding it completely free of defenders. The town was finally occupied on the 29th by two Italian columns.

Cortina became the seat of the Italian command as well as of hospitals and a resting place for the troops returning from the fighting in the sector; the whole basin was frequently subjected to fire from Austrian artillery, but the bombardments were never particularly intense and scarcely affected the town of Cortina. To avoid further distress to the population however, in 1916 the Italian commanders moved away, and life in Cortina went on quietly until November 5, 1917, when the Austro-Hungarians, following the rout of Caporetto, took possession of it once again. The last winter of the war also coincided with the hardest period for the civilian population, with the terrible food shortage that hit the Habsburg Empire, compelling the Austro-Hungarian troops to seize the few provisions the inhabitants had in occupied places.

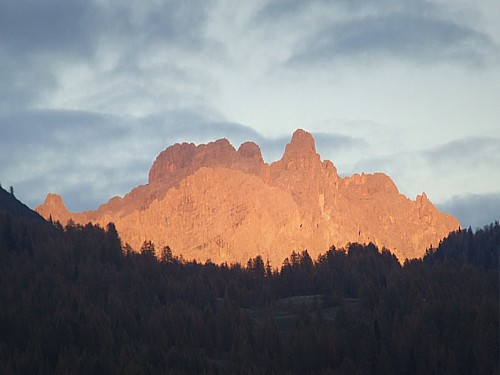
Pomagagnon

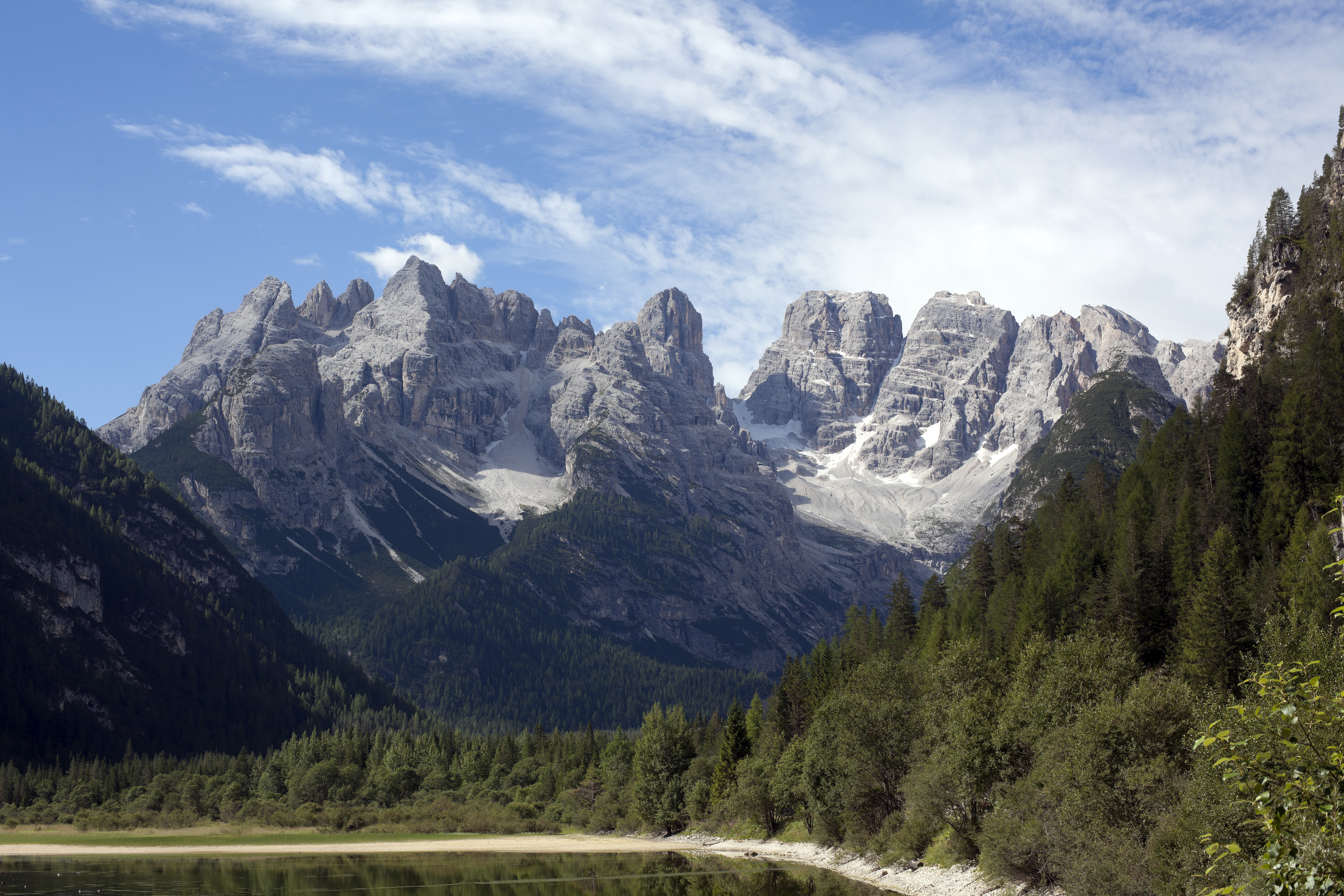
Monte Cristallo

Once Cortina was taken it was immediately clear that it could not be held securely without also taking the commanding heights above it – the Tofane to the north-west and Pomagagnon and Monte Cristallo to the northeast as well as the northern head of the basin itself – Val Travenanzes, Val Fanes and Val Acqua di Campocroce. Another objective strategic objective to be achieved was the occupation of the Alemagna road between Cortina and Carbonin. Thus at the end of May 1915 Italian troops advanced the "line of investment": Col Drusciè-Cadin-Staolin, a line from which the attack on the Som Pouses defense line would be attempted.

The action planned by the Italian command anticipated attacking the Austrian defences with three assault columns, supported by field artillery and batteries of howitzers, 149mm guns and 210mm mortars placed on the hills surrounding Cortina. The first column on the western flank, with companies of Alpine troops, fought fiercely during the night of 8 and 9 June at Ponte Alto, which it occupied. From here it carried out various attacks against the Fanes barrage and towards the Val Travenanzes as it tried an enveloping maneuver around the Tofane group, in conjunction with other attacks on the Lagazuoi and against the Castelletto delle Tofane. The Italian offensive continued until June 16 with poor results; the Austro-Hungarians were well entrenched in Val Travenanzes and benefited from the terrain, so eventually the Italian command broke off the attacks. The central column, strong with two infantry battalions, aimed directly at the Som Pouses barrage, strongly fortified and with excellent defensive positions starting from the trench in the Acqua di Campo Croce valley up to the crest of the Ciadenes-I Zuoghi which encloses the Gotres valley. On 9 June a rapid enveloping action allowed the Italians to occupy Podestagno, a wooded cliff overlooking the Alemagna road. The Austro-Hungarian defences could not be breached in this sector however and on the evening of 14 June the Italian command suspended any further attempt to advance. No less unfortunate was the eastern column, which on 7 June, bypassing the Pamagognon, descended along the Val Grande and reached the Alemagna road near the locality of Ospitale. From here, going up the Gotres valley, the attack proceeded as far as the end of the valley, at the Lerosa fork, along wide meadows where the Austro-Hungarians were well entrenched. Divided into three assault groups, the Italians attacked on 9 June, but once they arrived on the wide plateau they were met with heavy fire from automatic weapons that cost large numbers and the loss of more than fifty prisoners, until the attack here was also suspended.

This series of attacks did not obtain the desired objectives, but allowed the Italians to position themselves along a more advanced and more advantageous line that went from Ponte Alto to Rio Felizon, in the locality of Rufiedo. The Italian command failed to exploit the political advantage of capturing some Bavarian Jägers at Ponte Alto, which unequivocally demonstrated the presence of German troops deployed offensively, despite the fact that Italy was not still at war with Germany. These attacks were followed by exactly one year of truce, and in June 1916 the Italians attempted a new assault, this time concentrated against the Croda dell'Ancona and the coston del Forame. Taking these positions would have allowed the Italians to descend into Val Felizon towards Carbonin and in Val Acqua di Campo Croce, from where they would have seriously threatened the Austro-Hungarians’ positions in the Conca d'Ampezzo. To prevent this, the Austro-Hungarians further fortified their positions, and on 7 June they were ready to face the Italian troops who began their attack up the Alemagna road. Despite the determination of the Italian soldiers, on the evening of June 22, after a last vain and bloody attempt at the Som Pouses, the order was given to suspend the attacks, which had cost the attackers 324 dead, 2826 wounded and 85 missing. After this attack the positions remained unchanged until the Italian retreat in the autumn of 1917.

=== Monte Piana ===
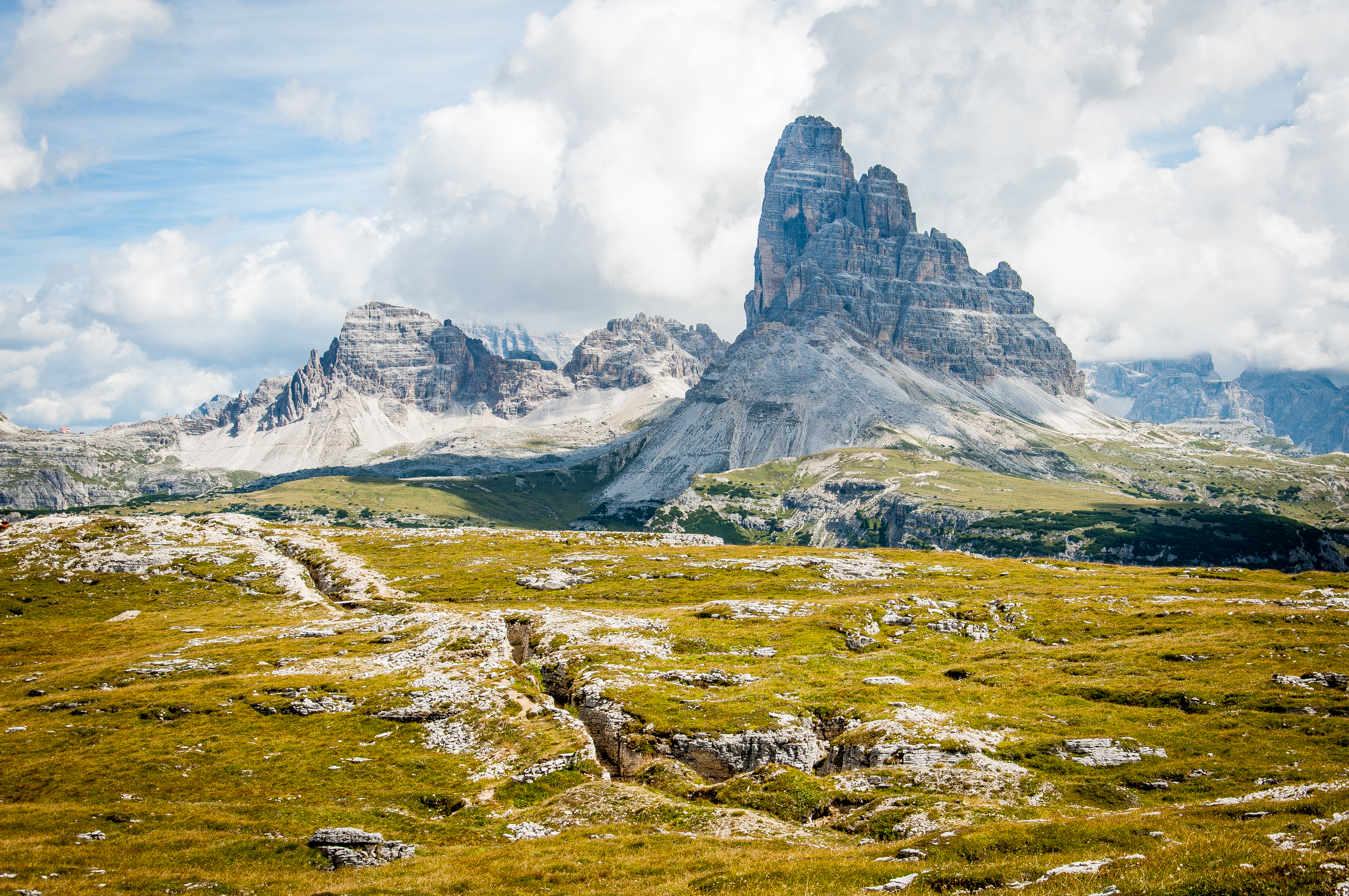
Trench on Monte Piana, looking towards the Tre Cime di Lavaredo

The borders of 1866 had given the advantage of ground to the Austro-Hungarians almost everywhere, but on Monte Piana the border favored Italy. Except for the northern end, the plateau that formed the upper part of the mountain was in Italian hands, and formed a wedge between the Rienza and the Landro valleys, pointing towards Dobbiaco. Before the war the Austrians had tried to reduce the threat from this position by fortifying Mount Rudo (Rautkofel) with several batteries that dominated the entire summit of Monte Piana. During the first days of the war small Italian patrols reconnoitred daily near the Austrian trenches, from where however they were chased back on 7 June 1915, the day the Austro-Hungarians started their first major action on the plateau. Goiginger gave orders for an attack carried out by two companies of Landesschützen and some units of Standschützen. Coming up at night from Carbonin, they attacked and wiped out the Italian garrison at Piramide Carducci, roughly in the middle of the plateau, where the Austrians had initially been based. Advancing up to the Italian lines the Austro-Hungarians were eventually forced to retreat by artillery and rifle fire, returning in the evening to the positions of Piramide Carducci and Forcella dei Castrati. Sporadic fighting and artillery fire continued until 11 June, when there was a lull for over a month, during which positions stabilized.

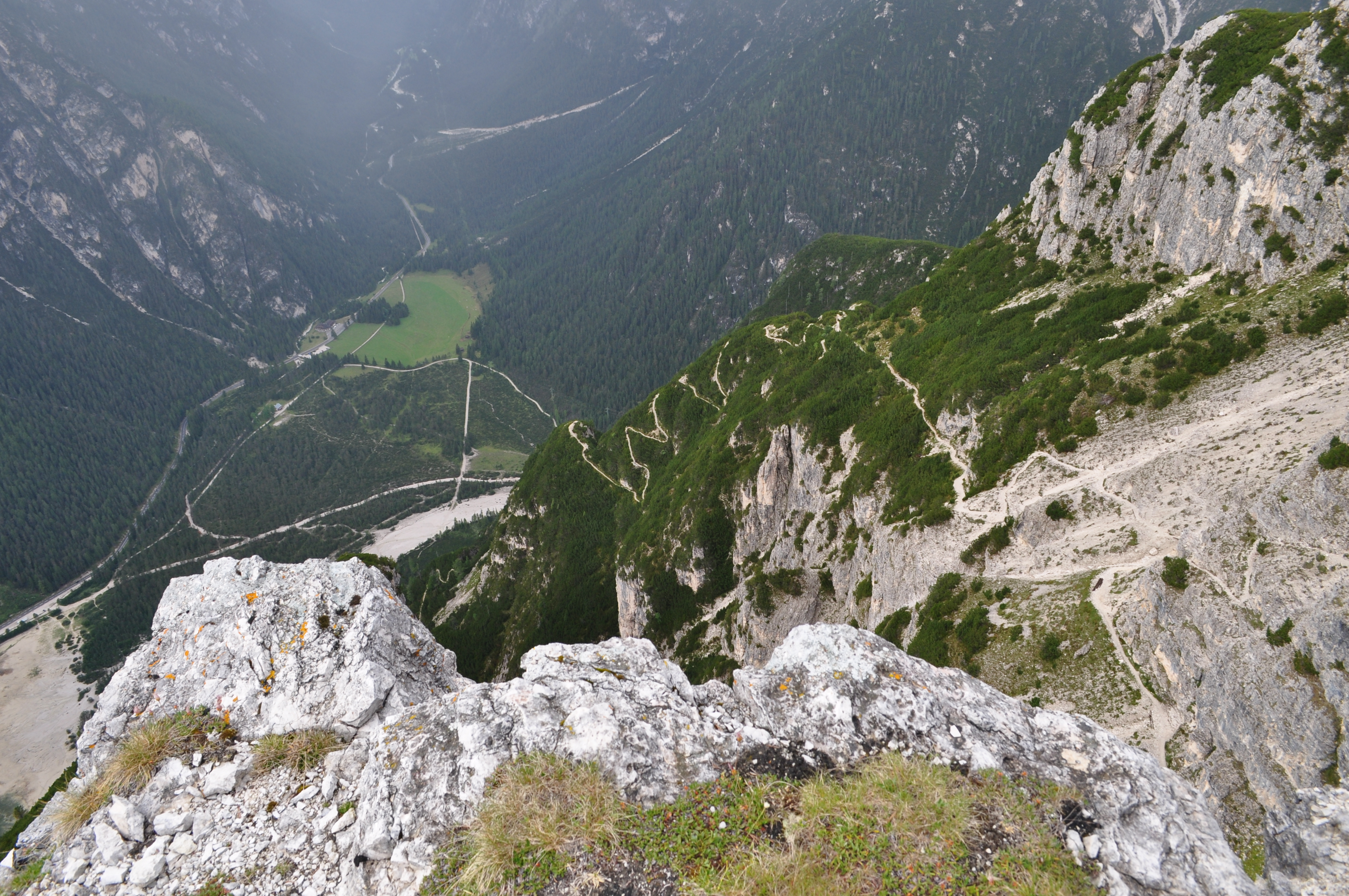
The supply route on the north side on Monte Piana

The Italians decided to wait for the arrival of additional artillery and built up overwhelming numerical superiority and it was not until July 15 that General Ottavio Ragni launched the attack on enemy positions. For five days there were attacks in three directions, which managed to drive the Austro-Hungarians back off the southern plateau and conquer Forcella dei Castrati, but did not take the strategic northern edge of the mountain. On the last day of the attack, July 20, the Italians reported 104 dead, 578 wounded and 151 missing, most of whom had been blown to pieces by enemy artillery. Assaults and counterattacks followed until September, when both sides stopped to prepare for the first winter of the war. The winter was particularly hard for the Austro-Hungarians in their precarious position, lacking water or fuel and supplied only by slow columns of porters ascending from Landro along a steep path targeted by Italian artillery. These months were mainly used to excavate covered trenches, tunnels and caves in the shelter of the northern edge; the paths on the western side were widened, and partly retraced in more sheltered positions, while at the end of November a cableway was erected that kept the Austrian-Hungarian line supplied for the next two years.

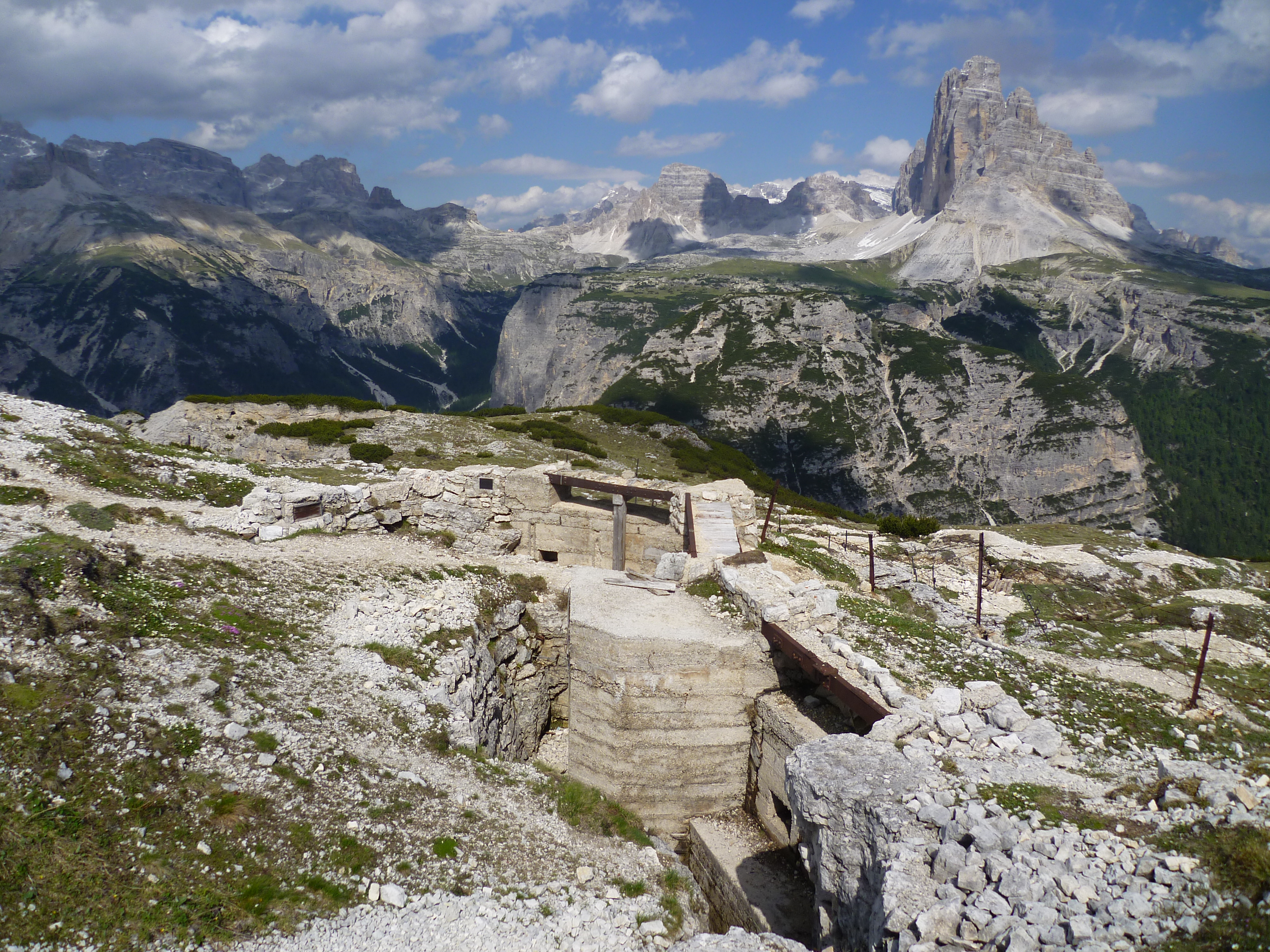
Monte Piana trenches

1916 saw a progressive strengthening of positions, especially on the Austro-Hungarian side, where the entire summit became a network of fortified defensive works. Soldiers led a mostly underground life in covered trenches, connecting tunnels and caves equipped for different functions. The Italians, with larger forces but weaker positions, continued their slow advance on the northern plateau. In August they managed to take the so-called "Fosso degli Alpini", a long depression on the eastern edge of the plateau, delimited by a grassy hill known to the Austro-Hungarians as "Kuppe K". This position was important because it tied the Austro-Hungarians down on another side of the mountain, and allowed the Italians to protect the ascent route along the Castrati valley, from which they could directly attack enemy lines. So at the end of August a short but fierce battle began for "Kuppe K", which was taken and lost several times, until the Italians managed to hold it.

Throughout that winter and the spring of 1917 the war of attrition continued, with bombings, clashes between patrols, attempts to infiltrate enemy lines and the excavation of mine tunnels, by both sides. The last major attack was carried out by the Austro-Hungarians on 22 October – just two days before the breakthrough of Caporetto – to divert Italian attention from the movement of troops along the Val Pusteria. Modest initial conquests were soon halted by the Italian artillery, which drove the attackers back to their starting positions. This was the last important action on Monte Piana.

=== Monte Cristallo ===
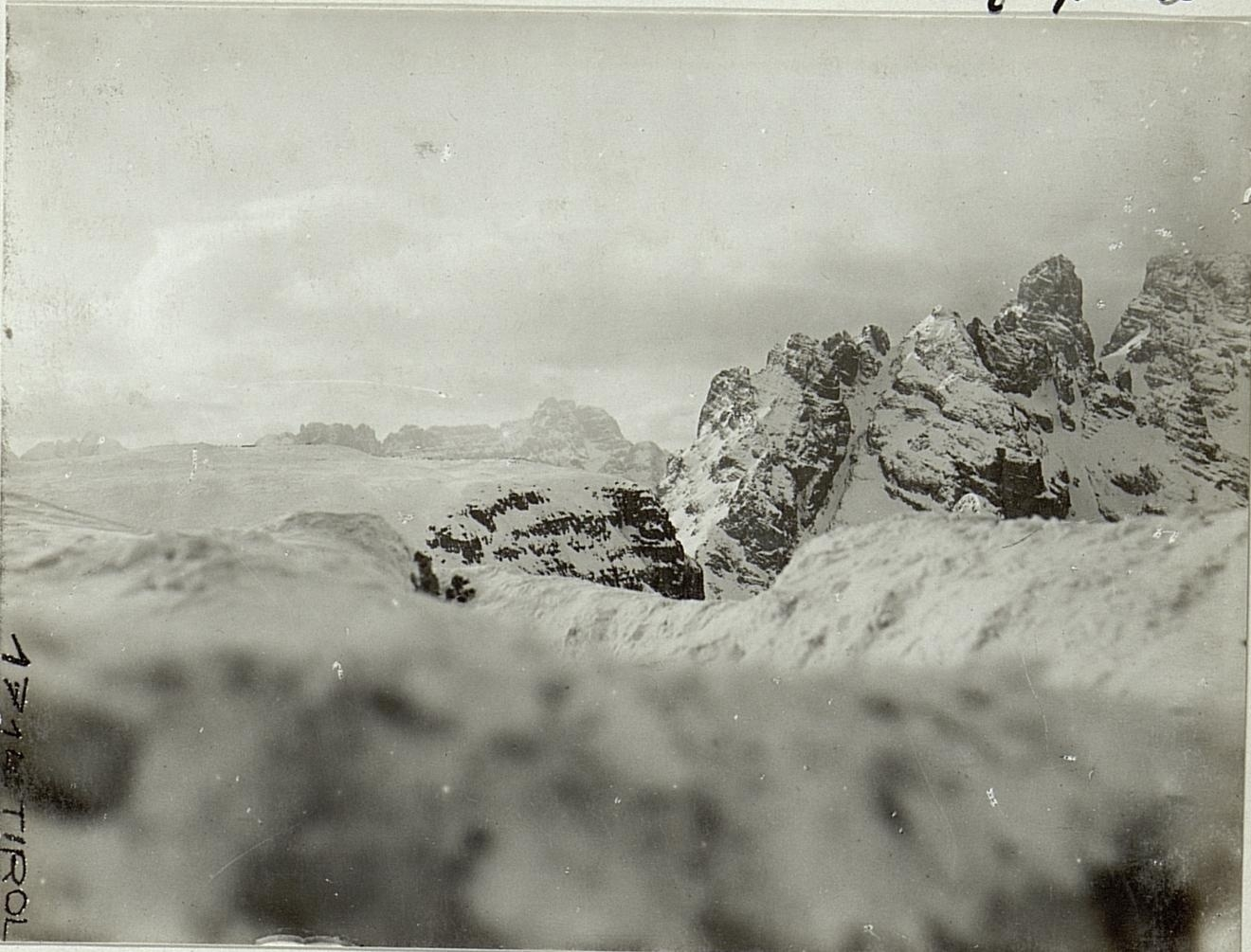
Monte Cristallo

The Cristallo Group lies between the Val Grande, the Misurina basin, the Val Popena and road from Rifugio Ospitale to Carbonin. At its centre stand the peaks of Cristallo itself at 3221m and Piz Popena at 3152m. The Cristallo subgroup had been occupied by the Italians in the early days of the war. For their part the Austro-Hungarians garrisoned the peaks that looked down towards the Ospitale - Carbonin road, the Forame at Forcella Verde and Forcella Gialla and the Costabella chain. The north-facing summit of the Rauhkofel/Cima Fumo was fortified and a line of trenches stretched from the slopes below it across the Val Popena, connecting it with Monte Piana.

In early August 1915 the Italians began attacking the Austro-Hungarian positions in the heights. Between 9 and 11 August Alpini units, strongly opposed by artillery and machine gun fire, began the assault on Forame and managed to take it on the night of 13th. Another column took the high peak of Cristallo, forcing the Austro-Hungarians back to Cresta del Costabella and Rauchkofel. After bringing artillery up onto the peak the Italians began to bombard these positions on 26 August. This was followed by another attack in from 11–26 September, but hampered by fog, snow and freezing temperatures, the Italians could not force the Austro-Hungarians off the mountain once and for all, and little ground changed hands. Another costly Italian attack between 20 and 26 October saw a group of volunteers try to outmanoeuvre the Austro-Hungarians by climbing over the glacier in camouflage, but they were detected and repulsed after several days of determined fighting.

In most sectors there were no major engagements after October each year at the latest, as the troops concentrated in preparing themselves to survive the winter. Unusually the IVth Army Command decided that the firm settled snow and the clear air of November favoured an infantry advance and the use of artillery. Having failed to take the high ground of Forame they decided to try a surprise attack immediately to the west, down the Val Felizon. When the attack began on 26 November it was plain that the Austro-Hungarians had been expecting it, and they cut down the advancing soldiers with machine gun fire as they struggled through snow 70 cm deep. By the evening when it was evident the attack had failed the brigade command requested permission to withdraw, but the 2nd Division command refused and at 20:45 ordered the action resumed the following morning. At dawn on 27 November, after an hour of artillery barrage to prepare for this assault, the XXXXVIII Bersaglieri should have resumed action. However the temperature was -20° and many of the soldiers had died of cold, with the survivors unable to advance. Nothing moved until at 14:30 Division ordered the action to stop. In two days the Italians had 897 casualties. Among the Bersaglieri 2 officers had died in action while five froze to death; among the men 29 had died in action, 111 were wounded, 20 missing and 318 had frozen to death. This was the last action of 1915 in this sector.

In the summer of 1916 the Italians mounted fresh attacks on the Austro-Hungarian positions on the Forame heights to the west of Rauhkofel. The plan was for a group of volunteers to work their way behind Austro-Hungarian lines at night and attack at dawn, when the main Italian forces would advance out of their trenches. Early in the morning of 29 August this plan was executed. Surprised, the Austro-Hungarians retreated leaving the Italians in control on the first ridge of the Forame, before progress halted. Between 4 and 6 September the Italians tried to push their way down the valley between Forame and Costa Bella, but constant Austrian fire stopped them advancing. Then, in a surprise counterattack in 13 September, the Austro-Hungarians retook the peak of Forame, and quickly hoisted up artillery and mortars to ensure they could not be removed again.

=== Croda Rossa di Sesto ===
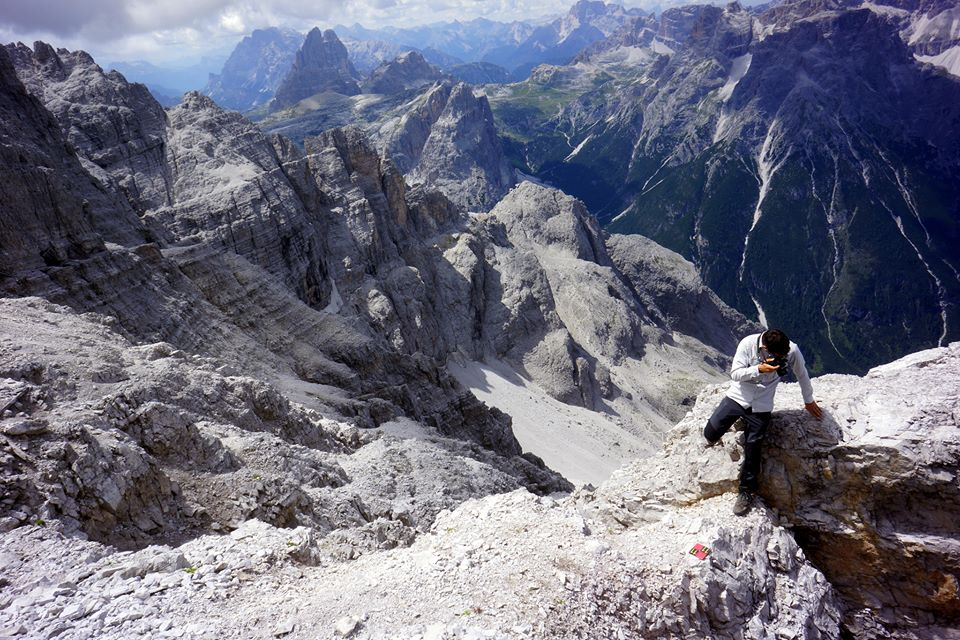
Archaeologist studying the remains of WW1 positions on the Croda Rossa

At the eastern edge of the 4th Italian Army sector, the Croda Rossa di Sesto was occupied by Austro-Hungarian troops on the Sesto side. From here they could control the pass of Monte Croce di Comelico, Cima Undici, the Zsigmondy crest and it:Monte Popera. The Austro-Hungarians had one of the best guides in the area, Sepp Innerkofler, and, from July, support from the German Alpenkorps who hoisted two mountain guns onto the northern slope of the summit, to strike at a possible Italian advance from the Monte Croce pass. Nevertheless the early months of the war were calm, mainly because snow made the peaks above 3,000m impassable. On 7 July Italian artillery destroyed the Zsigmondy refuge, and in August Italian troops occupied the upper Fiscalina valley, pushing up to the Zsigmondy ridge. Despite enormous difficulties they succeeded in taking the 3,042m summit of Monte Popera. Their attention then shifted towards the Sentinella Pass.

In August and September 1915 the Italians mounted a number of probing attacks at the Sentinella Pass, but autumn weather brought fighting to a standstill, with both sides leaving only small garrisons in position. It was the Italians who took the initiative in February 1916 with a new plan of attack which required Cima Undici to be occupied. The men chosen for the assault were the expert alpine troops of the "Cadore" and "Fenestrelle" battalions. On January 30 left they set off from the Zsigmondy ridge. Moving only at night or in bad weather over extreme terrain they advanced slowly through the heavy snowfalls and frequent avalanches of February and March. With the arrival of good weather, they had reached two narrow ravines called "Da Col" and "Dal Canton", from where they could attack the Sentinella pass. On the night of 15 and 16 March thirty-six men led by three officers attacked the pass. Achieving complete surprise, they encountered no resistance.

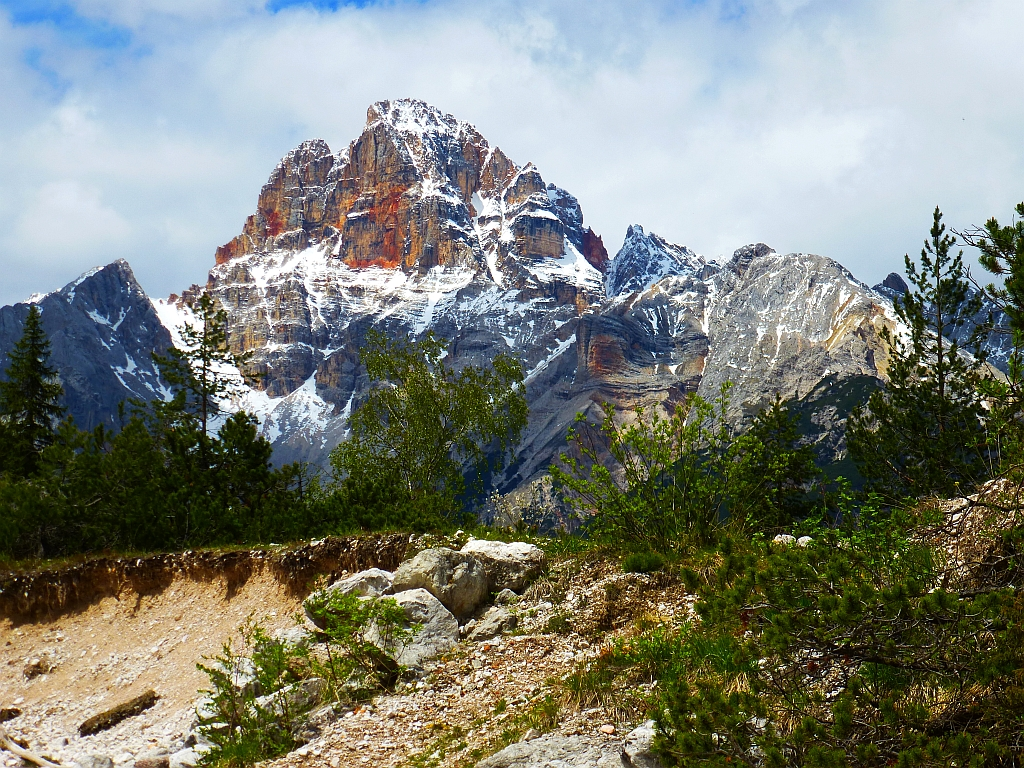
Croda Rossa

However taking the Sentinella Pass would not give the Italians any advantage as long as the Austrians controlled the Croda Rossa. The Austro-Hungarians began reinforcing their positions, under continuous fire from the Italian artillery in the Sentinella valley and on the Dito plateau. The Austro-Hungarian garrison increased from 20 to 150 men, and the whole summit was made impregnable. From June 16, the day of the last and failed Italian assault on the Croda, positions remained unchanged until November 1917, and the battle for the Croda Rossa turned into a daily routine of reconnaissance, with occasional small clashes. The harsh winter brought death to many in both sides on this section of the front, from avalanches, hunger, cold and disease.

With the front lines unchanging after March 1916 the only significant action was from the giant 280mm and 305mm Italian howitzers positioned around the Misurina basin and on the Comelico side of the Monte Croce Pass. Their shots were guided by observers on the top of the Cristallino di Misurina, on the Popera and on the flanks of Cima Undici from where the view extended to Dobbiaco and San Candido. It was the towns of Moso and Sesto that suffered most from the Italian howitzers. Moso was evacuated by the Austrians and almost completely destroyed by the Italians to prevent the enemy from using it to store supplies. Sesto was not initially evacuated, leading to many civilian casualties as the Italians struck at lodgings, warehouses and telephone services. The bombardment of the villages to the rear of the Austro-Hungarian lines continued until 1917, when the artillery was withdrawn following the breakthrough of Caporetto.

=== Tre cime di Lavaredo and Sasso di Sesto ===
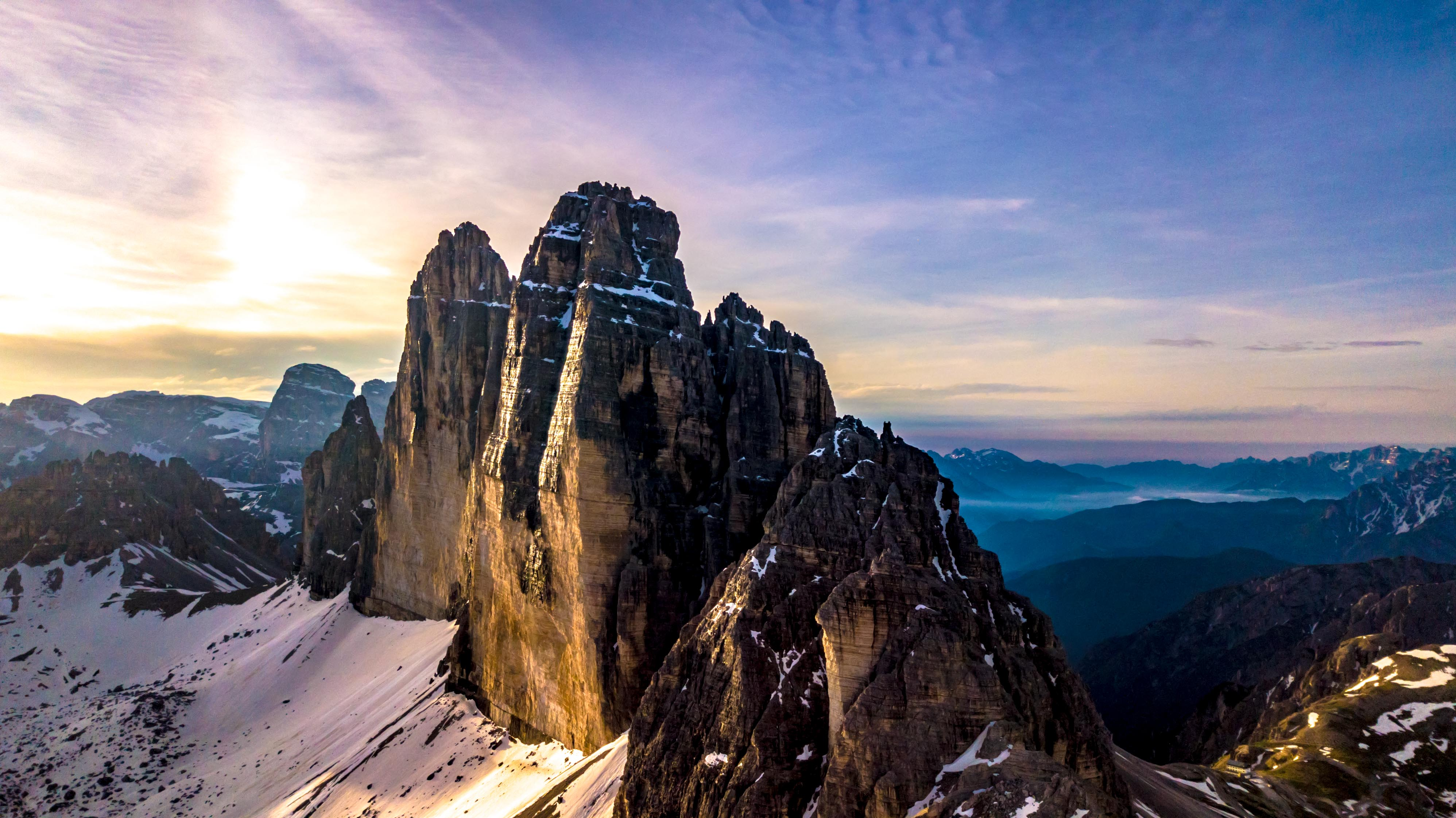
Tre Cime di Lavaredo

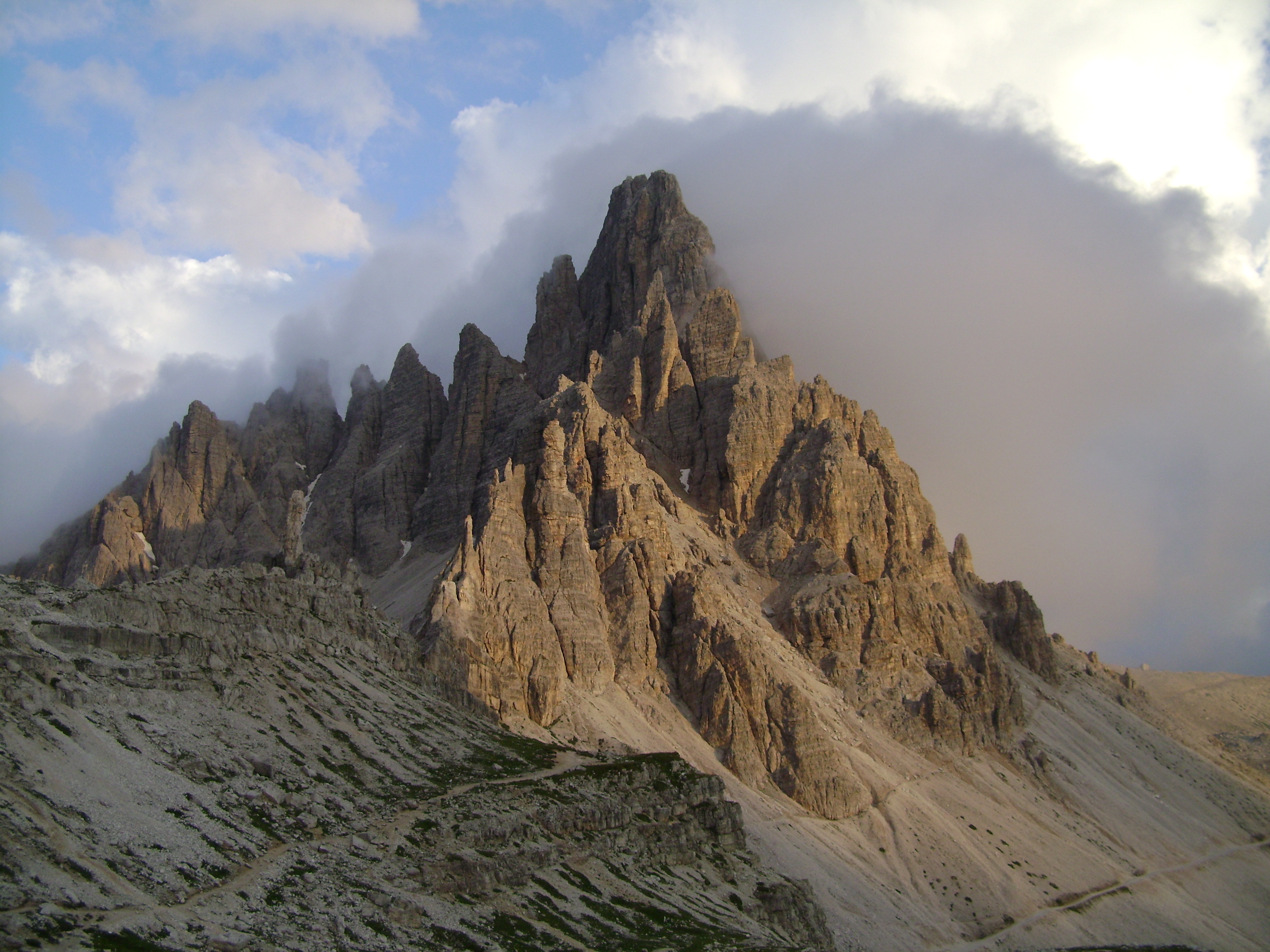
Monte Paterno

Fighting in the Lavaredo area was less intense and of less strategic importance than on other parts of the front. However because of the popularity of the Tre Cime and surrounding areas with climbers and skiers meant that attention to events there was very great. Added to this, the death of the famous guide Sepp Innerkofler, who had accompanied clients from all over Europe, added greatly to the interest.

Fighting started on the morning of May 24, 1915, with Italian cannon in Torre degli Scarpieri and Monte Rudo firing towards Monte Piana, to which the Austro-Hungarians responded by hitting the Italian positions of Forcella Lavaredo and Forcella Col di Mezzo. Here shrapnel struck two Alpini of the 67th Company and caused the first death on the Dolomite front. Over the following days there were clashes between patrols and small groups of soldiers trying to climb up and occupy small portions of rocky ground, but perhaps the most famous action was the Austro-Hungarian offensive on July 4, 1915 where Innerkofler lost his life. Together with some Standschützen he attempted to occupy the Passaporto fork to cut off the Italian supplies for the Paterno. The assault failed but the Austro-Hungarian commander Goiginger decided to attempt other strikes in the Tre Cime area on the evening of the same day. On the night of July 5 a group of Standschützen attacked the Mezzo Pass, but was repulsed by two groups of Alpine troops, while a dawn attack on the Arghena fork was repelled by an infantry unit, temporarily putting an end to the Austro-Hungarian initiatives in the Lavaredo sector.

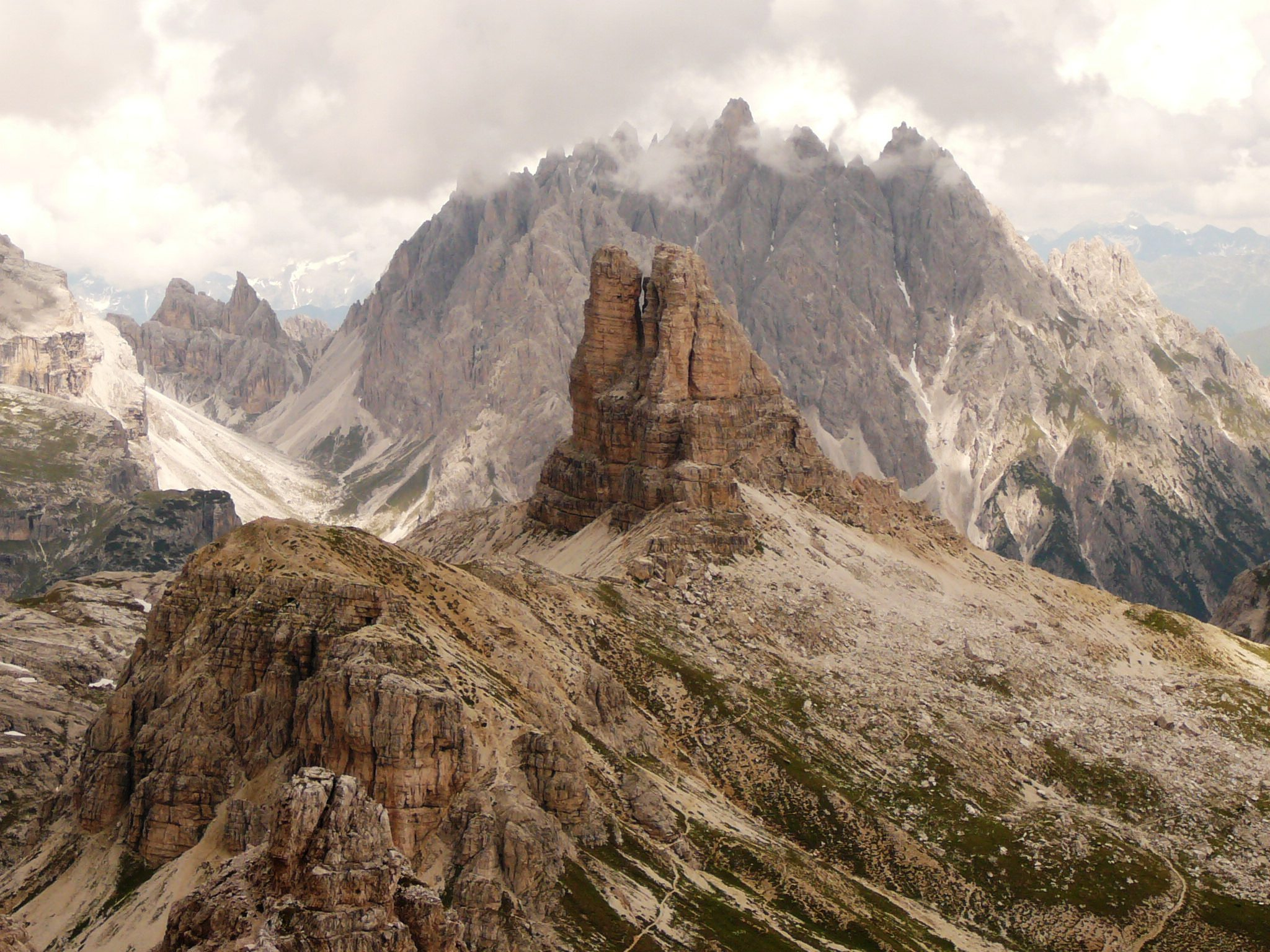
Torre di Toblin

The most notable event of the war in Lavaredo was an inconclusive attack by the Italians when the command of the I Corps decided to force its way into the Val Fiscalina and the Val Campo di Dentro. Six battalions of infantry were massed behind the Tre Cime with the support of two battalions of mountain guns. The attack began on 14 August with an advance towards the Toblin fork on three different routes: from the Col di Mezzo fork, the Lavaredo fork and the Pian di Cengia fork. The last column was the first to achieve success with the conquest of the Alpe dei Piani basin, while the other two columns struggled to advance, hampered by their artillery. After three days of fierce fighting the Italians managed to take the Toblin fork and the Sasso di Sesto, but not Torre Toblin, so the Austrians were still able to block the road towards the fork of San Candido and then towards the Val Pusteria. Later Italian attempts failed but the Italians managed to move the front about 12 kilometers, significantly improving their defensive line. The positions of the two sides were very close here: between the Sasso di Sesto and Torre di Toblin they were separated by just a few hundred meters and this contributed to making that small sector much disputed, although after 30 October, there was no further major action in the Lavaredo area.

The winter of 1916–1917 was unusually hard, as early as late August, when snow fell it did not melt. By November some positions were effectively isolated by the weather, with cableways and men themselves often affected by avalanches. Both armies excavated an extensive maze of tunnels and shelters in the rock and ice to improve the safety of their soldiers. In early 1917 the Austrians began to work on an assault tunnel under the snow. Work lasted two months, and on 21 April sixty soldiers, emerged little more than two metres from the enemy lines, attacking the trenches with hand grenades. The defenders were taken completely by surprise and many prisoners were captured while they slept. Although the Austro-Hungarians quickly captured the trenches, the Italians organised a counterattack from caves dug into the rock. At dawn, the Italian artillery began to strike the attackers, while two platoons were sent to reinforce the men hidden in the Sasso di Sesto tunnels. On the morning of April 22 the counterattack began and by the early afternoon the position was again in Italian hands. With this episode, major fighting in the shadow of the Tre Cime also ended.

=== Falzarego Pass ===
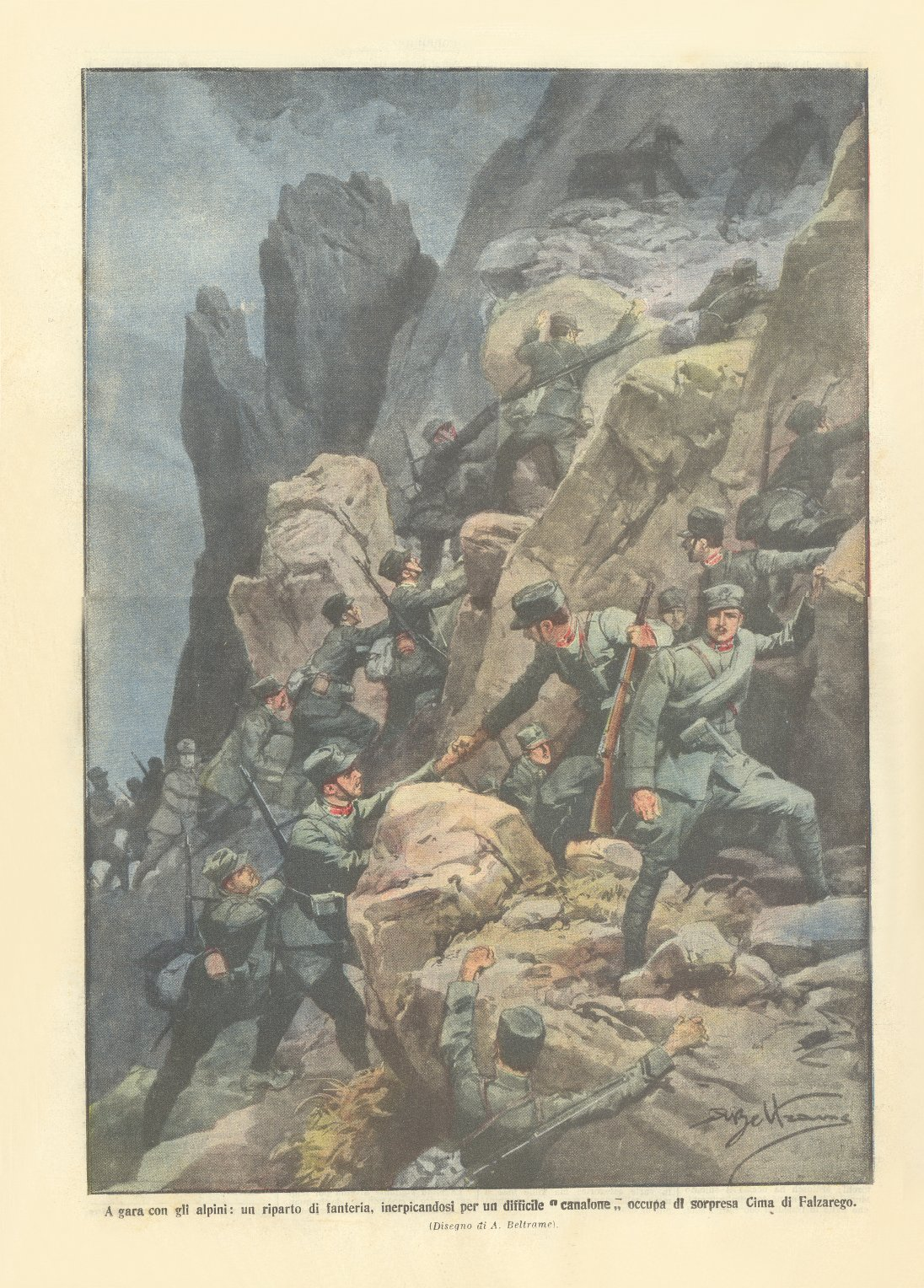
Italian infantry climbing up a difficult ravine unexpectedly occupies Cima di Falzarego.

The slowness of the Italian advance to secure Cortina d’Ampezzo allowed the Austrians to fortify and effectively seal off the routes to the north towards the Puster Valley. Unable to make any progress here, the Italians turned their attention westwards to the Falzarego Pass between the Sass de Stria and the Cinque Torri. If they could take this and then gain control of the Col di Lana, they could dominate the eastern Tyrolean highlands and prepare to attack up the Val Badia towards Bruneck.

On the 15th of June, furious fighting took place for the 2,477m spike-like Sasso di Stria which had been fortified by the Austro-Hungarians. The Italian attack was disorganised and easily repelled, and for the next two years small pieces of ground around the Pass were won and lost by both sides without either gaining any clear advantage. The Italians decided to focus on dislodging the Austrians from various high points around the eastern entrance to the Pass, particularly the rocky outcrop called the Casteletto on the Tofana di Rozes. The fighting to secure thus became so intense that the Austrians called it the “Schreckenstein” – “The rock of horror.

Unable to push the Austro-Hungarians off the Casteletto, in 1916 the Italians decided to dig a 500m gallery from their positions to the foot of the outcrop and use 35 tons of gelignite to destroy it. The Austro-Hungarians responded by countermining but the Italians were so confident of success that General Cadorna and King Victor Emmanuel were invited to observe the detonation of the mine followed by the rapid assault by Italian troops held ready in another tunnel to swarm out after the explosion. The attack on 11 July was only partially successful. Many Italian soldiers were killed by carbon monoxide from the explosion as they rushed downhill, while others were killed by falling rocks. They managed to take the south side of the Casteletto but did not manage to drive the Austrians off completely for another three months.

Taking the Casteletto turned out not to give the Italians a decisive advantage and they still could not force their way through the Falzarego Pass. Their next attempt was to reach the top of the Piccolo Lagazuoi, digging an over 1 km long tunnel system with a vertical drop of 500m. This also failed, but on 20 June 1917 the Italians succeeded in using 32 tons of dynamite to blow up the 2668m high summit of Piccolo Lagazuoi. Despite heavy losses the Austro-Hungarians were still able to hold the attackers off with machine gun fire. There was little movement in this sector following this until the general withdrawal after Caporetto.

=== Col di Lana ===
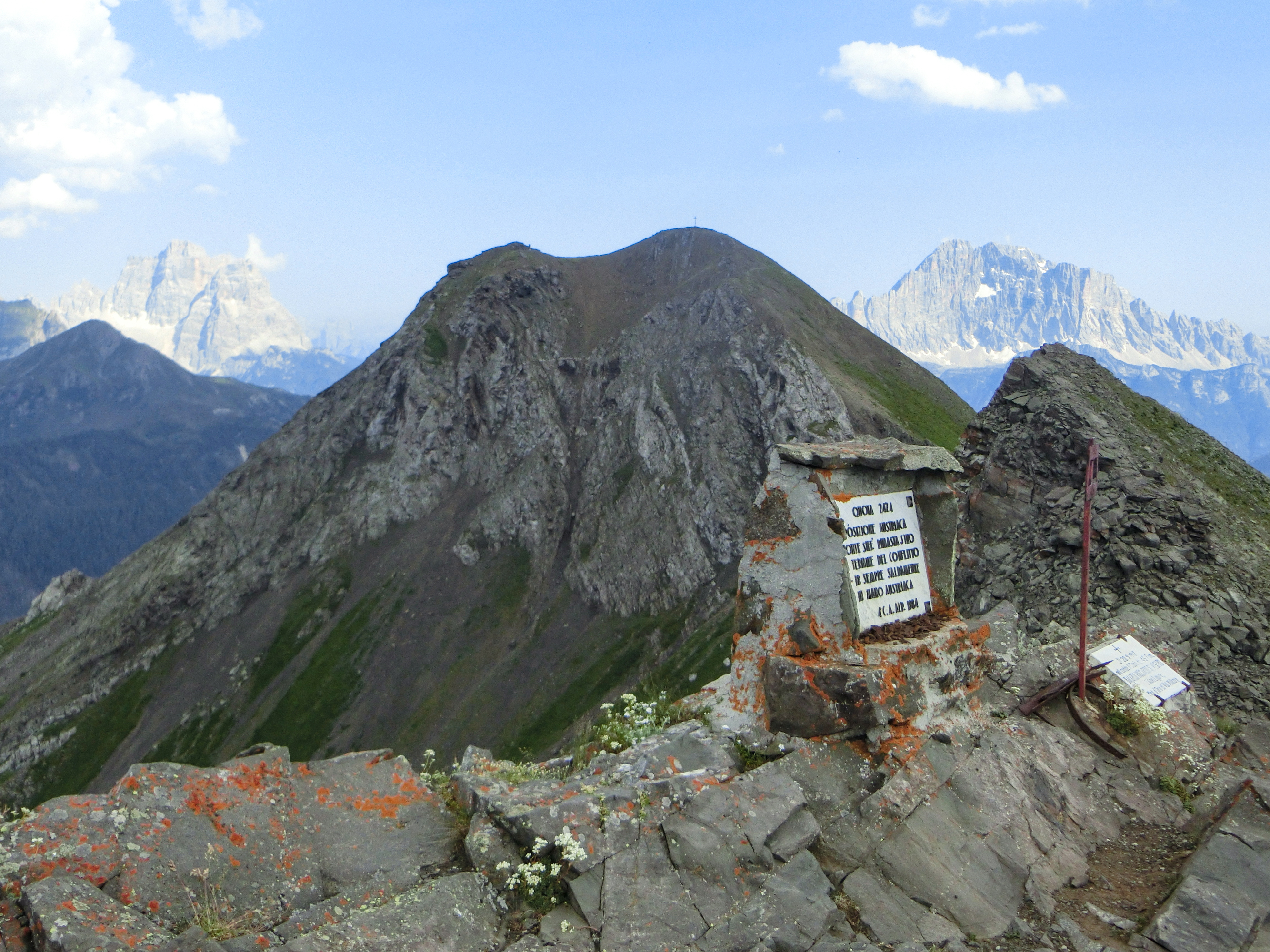
Marker for the Austrian positions on Col di Lana

The Col di Lana is one of the least striking mountains in the Dolomites in its appearance, but its location meant it was hotly disputed by the two armies. The mountain dominated all road traffic moving between the Pordoi Pass and the Falzarego Pass, connecting Cortina d’Ampezzo with Canazei and the tens to the west. It was protected to the west by Forte La Corte and on the northern side, at the foot of Mount Lagazuoi, by Forte Tre Sassi.

The first action took place on 8 June 1915 when Italian batteries on Monte Padon and Col Toront bombarded the La Corte and Tre Sassi forts as well as Austro-Hungarian infantry positions. The attack was repeated a week later, and expanded to strike at Livinallongo del Col di Lana. If the assault had begun earlier the weak Austro-Hungarian presence might have been easily dislodged, but between May and a June the Austrians had fortified the Costone di Salesei and the Costone di Agai, meaning that it would take a frontal attack on Col de Lana to push them out. On 15 June, some Italian patrols sent towards the enemy positions were easily neutralized, and this was followed by series of bloody frontal attacks that achieved nothing. The Italians launched ten further attacks against Col di Lana and five against the adjoining Mount Sief until General Rossi called a halt on 20 July to await reinforcements.

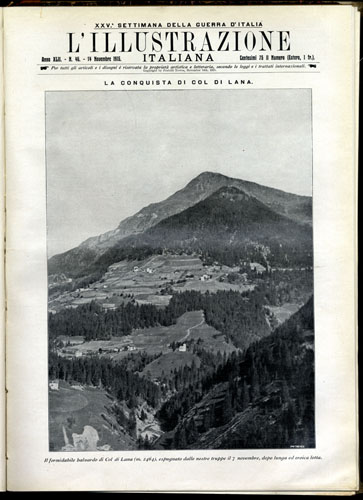
Italian magazine cover celebrating the short-lived taking of the Col di Lana, 1915

Despite this pause in infantry attacks the Italian artillery continued to bombard the La Corte and Tre Sassi forts. By the beginning of August, Tre Sassi was practically a pile of rubble, and this prompted the Italians to renew their attacks on 2 August. They were repulsed again. Smaller attacks on the Costone di Salesei and the Costone di Agai were also broken up by Austro-Hungarian artillery. A major new frontal assault was launched on 21 October, in which the Italians outnumbered the defenders ten to one. Trench by trench, at great cost, the Austro-Hungarians were dislodged from their positions and on 7 November the 60th Infantry Regiment of the Brigade "Calabria" finally conquered the summit. However it fell back into Austro-Hungarian hands on the same day thanks to the Landesschützen of Captain Konstantin Valentini, and the Italians withdrew just below the summit, only 80 meters from the Austro-Hungarian trenches.

Throughout the winter the Austro-Hungarians dug an intricate system of covered tunnels and walkways that protected the soldiers from Italian artillery. On 1 January, the Austro-Hungarians started the mine war with an explosion on the Lagazuoi, and, picking up the idea, in mid-January the Italians began work on a mine tunnel just below the summit. On April 17, 5020 kilograms of explosives devastated the summit of Col di Lana, killing 110 Austro-Hungarians instantly, while the rest of the garrison was taken prisoner by the I Battalion, 59th Infantry Regiment of the Brigade "Calabria".

While the Italians dug in and fortified Col di Lana the Austro-Hungarians did likewise on Sief, each side making it effectively impossible for the other’s soldiers to attack across the intervening ground. Warfare therefore moved underground. The initiative was taken by the Austro-Hungarians, who in June 1916 began work on a mine that was intended to destroy the Italian garrison on the Dente del Sief, which they had just conquered. The Italians realized this maneuver late and only in March 1917 did they begin a counter-mine tunnel. This however proved too short, and they destroyed part of their own lines and created a crater between the two armies. The Austro-Hungarians proceeded with their work and on October 27, 45,000 kilograms of explosives tore the mountain to pieces, creating an 80-meter crater and killing 64 Italians. Shortly afterwards, after Caporetto, the Italians fell back to the line of the Piave and Monte Grappa, leaving the mountain in Austro-Hungarian hands and thousands of bodies of fallen men.

=== Marmolada glacier ===
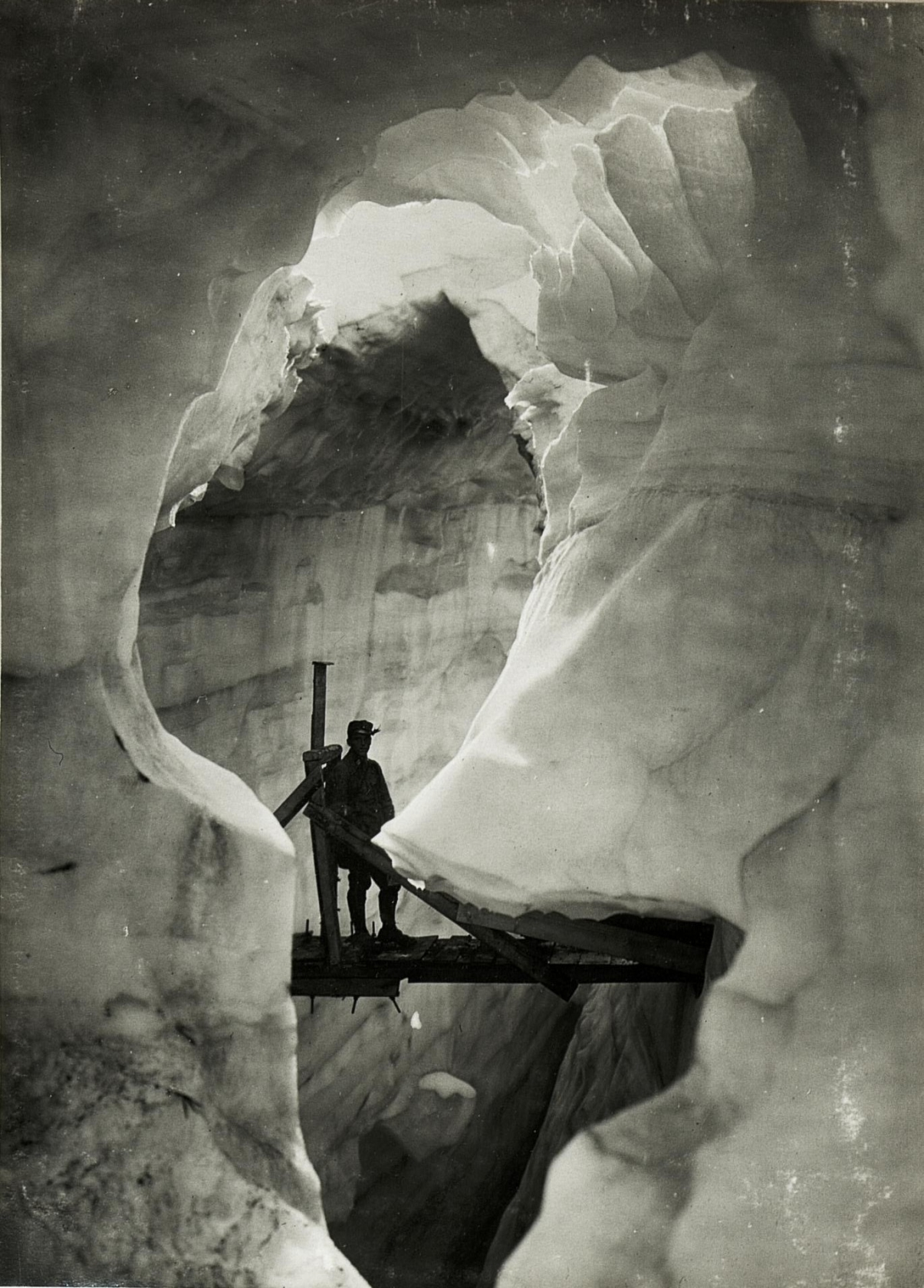
The so-called “Bridge of Sighs” in the Austrian tunnels under the Marmolada glacier

During the whole of 1915 neither of the two armies attempted to occupy the Marmolada massif that divided the fighters. Apart from some skirmishes between enemy patrols, who had pushed themselves up onto the Marmolada di Punta Penia at 3344m, the sector remained calm until the spring of 1916, when Austro-Hungarian units occupied a number of strongpoints facing the glacier. This move threatened the Italians on Col di Lana, so they occupied the eastern part of the Piz Serauta, fortifying themselves and installing a cableway. From then on, both sides worked intensively to reinforce their positions and protect themselves from the elements and enemy artillery. The Austrians established their central supply point under the tongue of the glacier on the Gran Poz at 2300 meters, at the uppermost point of the cableway, and from there porters took supplies to the positions at "Forcella della Marmolada", "3259", "Twelve", "Eleven", "2800" and "slot S". Using ecrasite first, and then brute strength, they dug numerous tunnels inside the glacier to shelter from the Italian artillery firing down on them. The works continued throughout the winter of 1916 until the construction of what was called "the city under the ice" was complete. This was a network of barracks, kitchens, field hospitals, storerooms and gun emplacements under the ice connected by 12 km of tunnels.

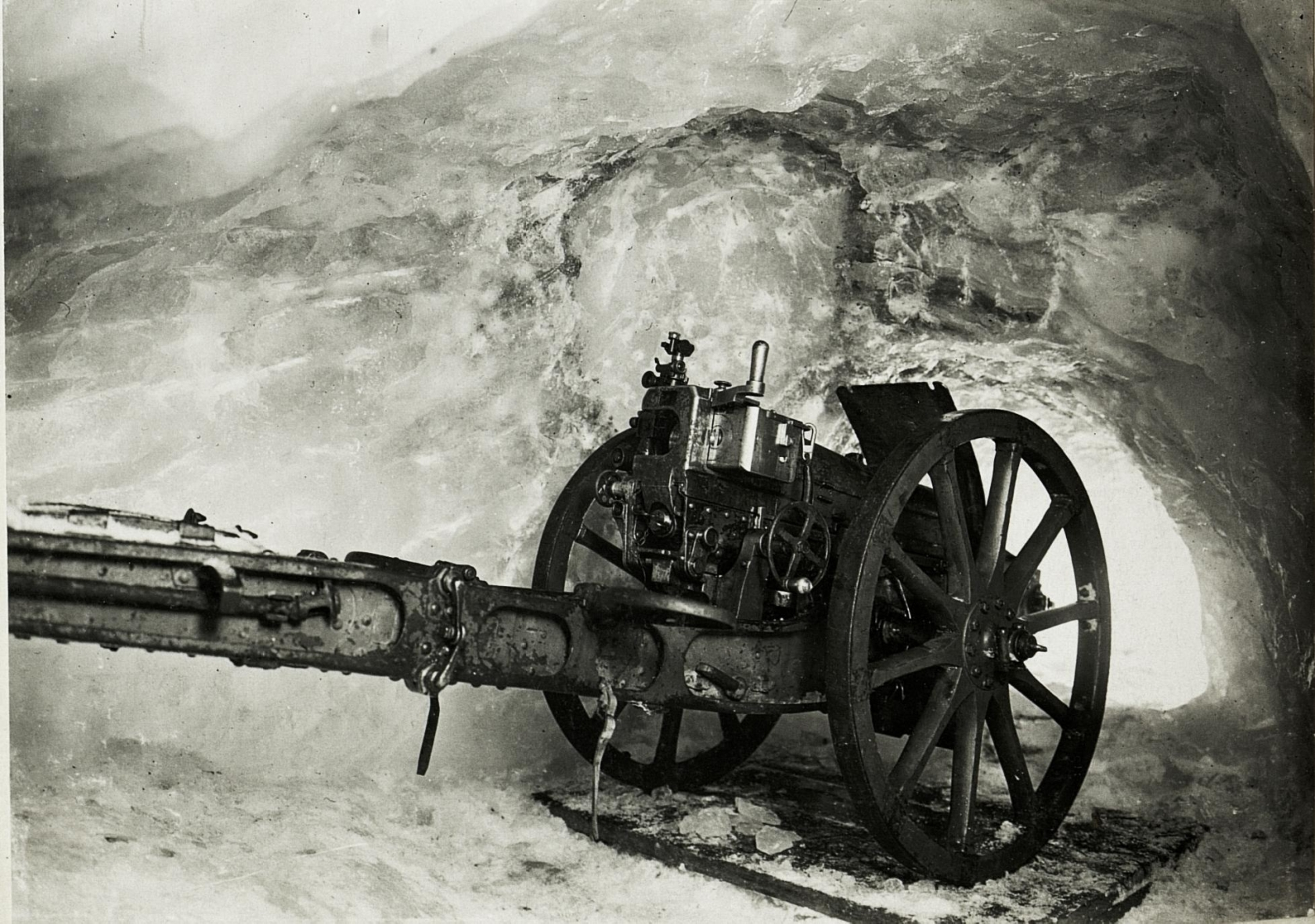
Austrian gun inside an ice cave at position "32" on Marmolada

The conflict proceeded as a work of mining and countermining through rock and ice. The Austrians managed to create a large enough hole from which they could direct artillery fire towards the Italians. But the Italians, after learning that they were under fire, accelerated the countermining work, and thanks to the help of drilling machines in a short time they managed to reach under the enemy positions, which were blown up in several points, eliminating the danger of artillery attack.

The Italians could bring much greater numbers and more regular supplies to the Marmolada, so the Austro-Hungarians were on the defensive, digging more and more shelters in the ice and rock in order to hold their positions. Other than mining and countermining, and artillery and grenade attacks there was no movement on this front until the Italians abandoned their positions after Caporetto.

== The Adamello-Presanella sector ==
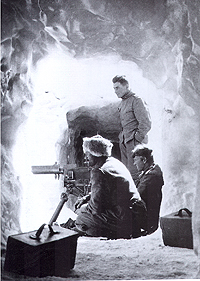
Alpini machine-gunners in the corno di Cavento, facing Adamello.

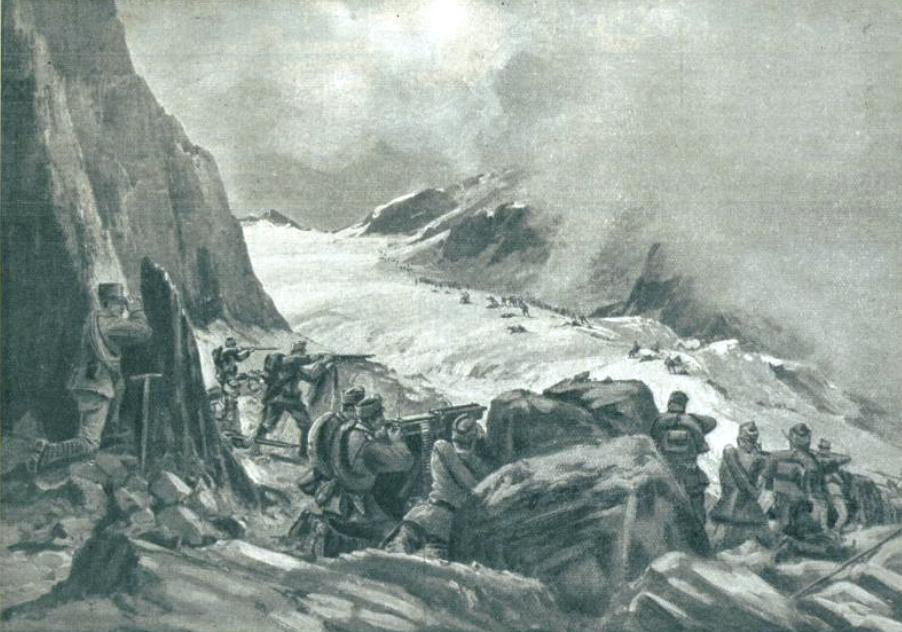
Austrian forces repel an attack on the Presanella glacier

The first action in this sector was a surprise Italian attack on 9 June 1915 by the ""Morbegno battalion" on the Presena glacier at the north end of the Adamello: however they were detected and forced back by sniper fire. On 5 July the Austro-Hungarians responded with a surprise attack on the Italian garrison of Lago di Campo at the southern end. Despite heavy losses the Italians managed to repel the attack, forcing their opponents to retreat to their starting positions. On July 15 the Austrians pressed a new attack on the Giuseppe Garibaldi refuge but the defenders managed, once again, to resist. On 25 August the Italians renewed their attack in the north; this time the Alpini attacked the creste di Monticelli at night and surprised the Austro-Hungarians; once they had the ridge, fortification works began immediately. However further Italian attacks on the Presena glacier on 14 September and on 30 October failed before winter set in and fighting became impossible.

The following spring hostilities resumed on 12 April, when the Alpini at the Giuseppe Garibaldi refuge successfully attacked the Austrian defensive line between Lobbia Alta and Monte Fumo. A further attack was launched between 29 and 30 April, towards the Cavento Pass. For the first time in this area, heavy artillery was used to support the infantry. Despite the lack of winter camouflage that forced them to fight in grey-green uniforms, the Italians managed to take the Austro-Hungarian positions on the crozzon del Diavolo between 1 and 4 May. After this the front more or less came to a standstill. To bring light supplies such as food and wine up to their front lines, the Italians changed from using mules to using dogs, as they were faster and needed less food.

The front remained calm through most of 1917. The main operation was the Italian seizure of the Corno di Cavento in 15 June 15. On 27 September Austro-Hungarian attacked the town of Ponte di Legno with incendiary bombs and shells, destroying it and forcing its inhabitants to flee.

Because this sector was at the western limits of the front, Italian troops were not withdrawn after the defeat at Caporetto as they were in the Dolomites and elsewhere, and fighting continued into 1918. The main operation of the year in this sector, known as the "White Battle", took place between 25 and 28 May. Seven battalions of Italian troops together with Arditi, machine gunners and around 200 pieces of artillery attacked and took the Presena glacier and nearby peaks.

On 13 June the Austro-Hungarians launched a last attack to try to break the Italian lines. They threw all their remaining forces into the “Avalanche Offensive” in the hope of trying to create a Caporetto-style breakthrough in the Alps. Without German support however they made no headway and the attack foundered in its first day.

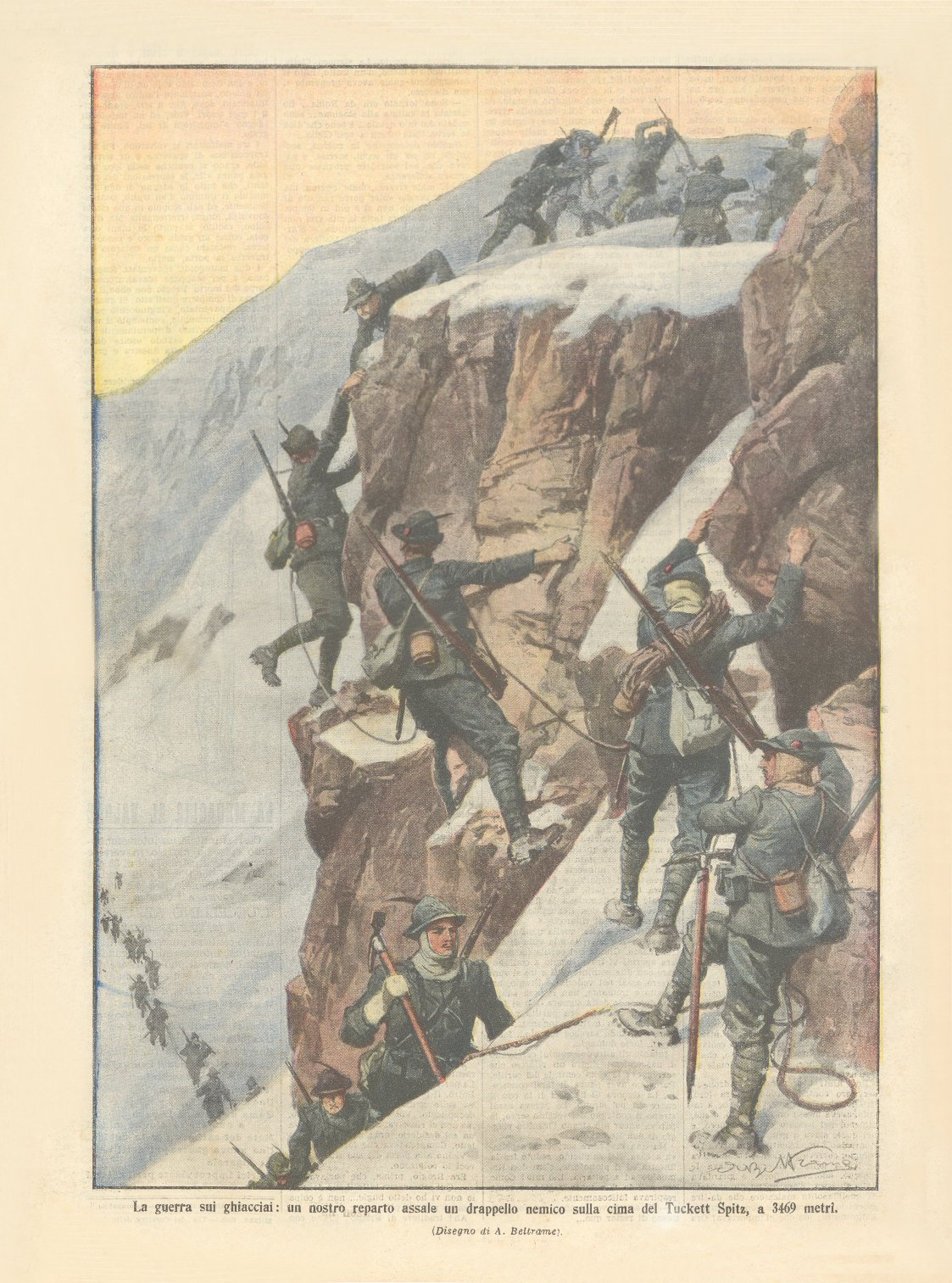
Italian units attack an Austrian squad on the top of Tuckettspitze, at 3469 meters in the Ortles-Cevedale sector.

Exactly one year after losing the Corno di Cavento, on June 15, the Austro-Hungarians managed to regain it by digging a tunnel in the glacier, but the Italians were able to eject them again on July 19 and hold it thereafter. In another attack on 13 August the Alpini managed to regain the Torrione d'Albiolo, lost at the beginning of the war in 1915.

On 1 November 1918 the final Italian attack came, this time on the Tonale Pass. The Austrians were no longer able to resist. Whole units surrendered and the Italian army was able to advance rapidly into the entire Val di Sole and on to Trento. This brought the war in Adamello to an end.

== The Ortles-Cevedale sector ==
Austrian soldiers in their trenches on Piz da las Trais Linguas in the Ortles-Cevedale sector.

The Ortles-Cevedale peaks, on average 500m higher than those in the other two sectors, offered the most extreme conditions of all the Alpine battlefields. The ground here was also unusually hard, making the building of trenches and tunnels extremely difficult. These conditions made it almost impossible for either side to mount a decisive attack in the other, so the front was relatively static here. The major conflict here was the Battle of San Matteo, which took place in August 1918 on Punta San Matteo (3,678 meters). This was the highest altitude fighting seen anywhere in the First World War.

== Capture of Trento ==
With the Italian victory at the battle of Vittorio Veneto, General Tassoni's 7th Army began the last high mountain campaign: the III Alpine group passed the Stelvio Pass and descended on Trafoi, while other Alpine units crossed the Gavia Pass and the Passo del Tonale and reached Peio and Fucine; from Adamello the Italian troops marched on Pinzolo, with the final objective of Merano and Bolzano. Along the Sarca valley, the 4th Division reached Tione and continued towards Trento; Without encountering much resistance, the Pavia brigade pushed its vanguards up to Arco, upstream from Riva del Garda. On the afternoon of 3 November the troops of the 1st Army reached Trento: the first departments to enter the city were at 3.15pm the cavalrymen of the "Alessandria" cavalry regiment, the Arditi of the XXIV assault department, the Alpini of the IV group; later the troops of the Pistoia brigade also arrived.

== Prisoners of war ==
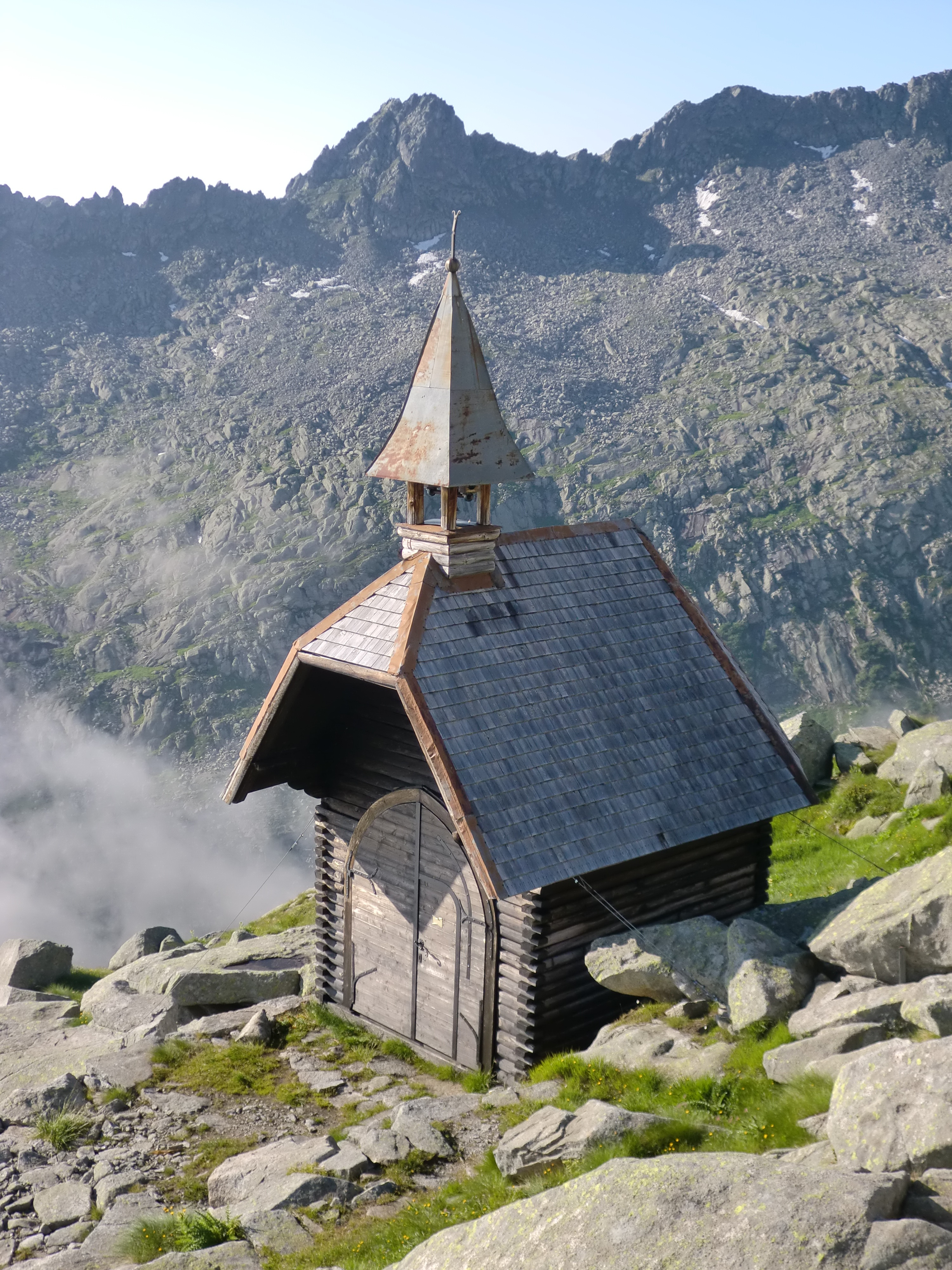
Orthodox church built by Russian prisoners of war, rifugio Carè Alto

The effort of maintaining a solid front line in such extreme conditions was enormous and required enormous reserves of labour. For this reason, the Austro-Hungarian command compelled the local inhabitants of the valleys behind the front line – including women and children – to work for them.

As these were not sufficient, the Austrians also drafted in prisoners of war captured on the eastern front, although the Hague Convention of 1907 prohibited this. These men were made to do the hardest and riskiest jobs, such as the construction of cableways and trails. They were also used away from the front line, in the valleys doing agricultural work, taking the place of those who had had to leave for the front. In 1915 there were around 27,000 prisoners in the Tyrol, but after this the count of both the living and the dead was soon lost.

These men tried to escape every day, sometimes providing intelligence to the Italian Alpini who were only a few hundred metres away. At the Carè Alto refuge in Adamello, Russian prisoners built an Orthodox church which still stands today.

== See also ==
- Alpini and Mountain Artillery formations in World War I
- Heldenkampf in Schnee und Eis (propaganda film)
- Mines on the Italian front (World War I)
- Museum of the White War in Adamello
- Austro-Hungarian fortifications on the Italian border
- Mountain warfare
- Erste Dolomitenoffensive
- Zweite Dolomitenoffensive
