= Battle of Sentinella Pass =

1915 battle in WWI Italy

- Part of the Italian Front of World War I
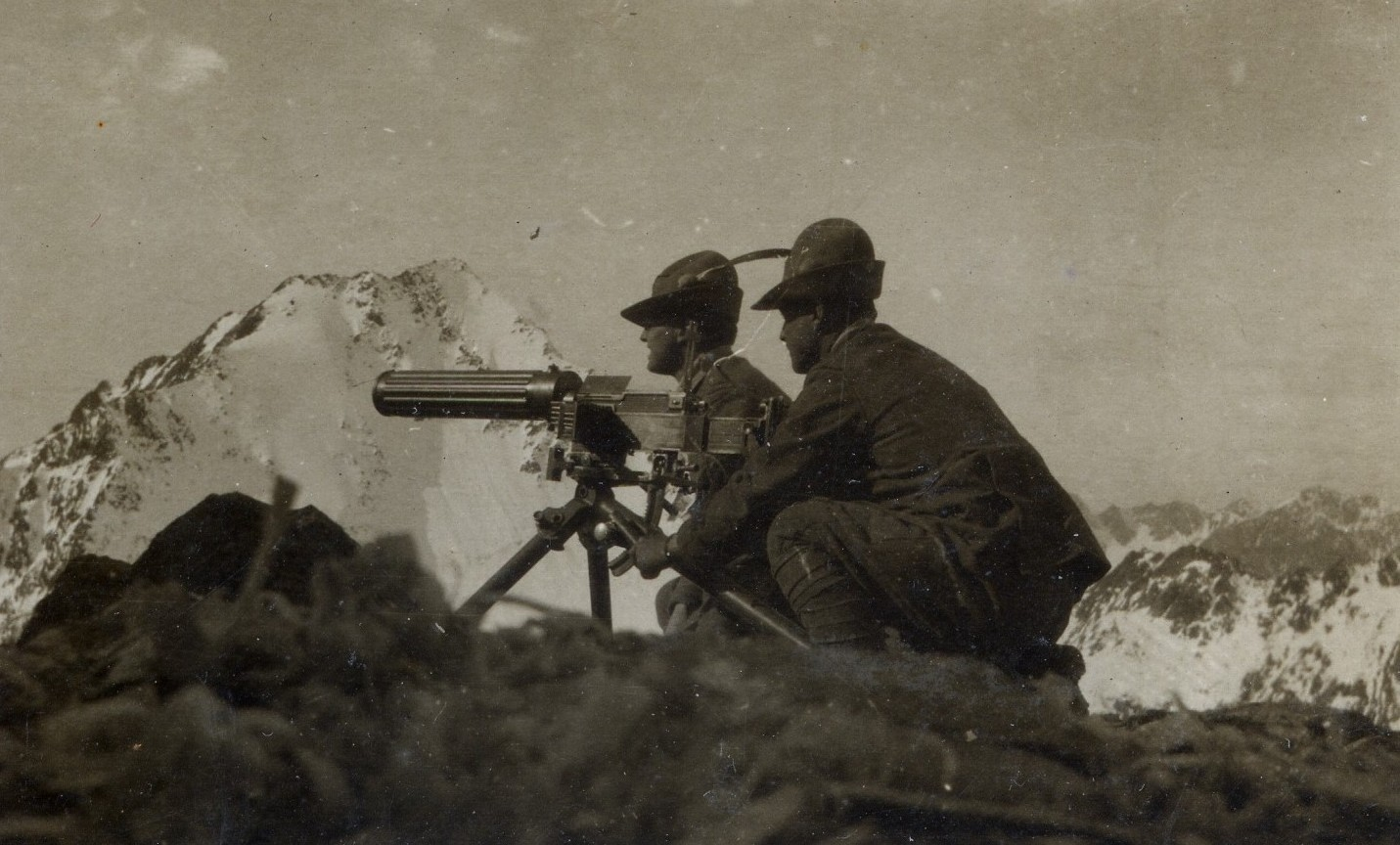
- Italian soldiers after reached the most eastern height of the pass
Date	August – September 1915
Location	Sentinella Pass, Veneto, Italy 46°38′28.79″N 12°22′43.79″E
Result	Italian victory
Territorial changes	The Italians capture Sentinella Pass, Height 11, Val Popera, Sesto and Comelico

Belligerents
Italy	Austria-Hungary

Commanders and leaders
Giovanni Sala; Italo Lunelli	Unknown

Casualties and losses
5 wounded	Many killed, wounded and captured
- Many more dead because of the low temperature
- Location of the battle in Italy

The Battle of Sentinella Pass (in Italian: Battaglia del Passo della Sentinella; in German: Schlacht am Pass von Sentinella) was fought between the Kingdom of Italy and Austria-Hungary during the White War phase during the Italian front of World War I. The battle ended with the Italian capture of the pass.
