= Luigi Nava =

Italian general of the army during WWI and the First Italo-Ethiopian War

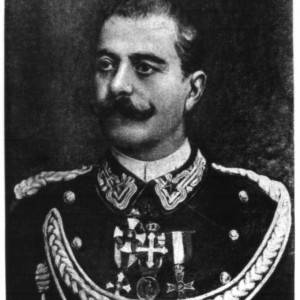
- Born: June 13, 1851; Turin, Piedmont, Kingdom of Sardinia
- Died: July 9, 1928 (aged 77); Alessandria, Piedmont, Italy
- Alma mater: Royal Academy of Turin
- Military career
- Allegiance: Italy
- Branch: Royal Italian Army
- Service years: 1870–1921
- Rank: General of the Army
- Commands: 4th Army
- Conflicts: Italo-Ethiopian War of 1887–1889: Battle of Dogali; First Italo-Ethiopian War: Battle of Adwa (POW); World War I: Italian Front; White War

Luigi Nava (June 13, 1851 – July 9, 1928) was an Italian General of the Army who participated in the First Italo-Ethiopian War and World War I. He participated in the Italian colonial campaign in the Horn of Africa which lead to his participation at the Battle of Adwa, where he was wounded and taken prisoner by the Abyssinians. Having become Lieutenant General, at the action of the general mobilization of 1915 he was appointed commander of the 4th Army but was dismissed from the command four months after Italy entered the war.

== Early career ==
He was born in Turin on June 13, 1851, as the son of Giacomo Antonio and Elisabetta Salino. He entered the Royal Academy of Turin on September 22, 1867, and graduated with the rank of second lieutenant of the General Staff of the artillery in July 1870. He was promoted to lieutenant on July 25, 1872, and served in the 3rd Field Artillery Regiment, where he became aide-major in the 2nd. In 1874, he began to attend the Scuola di applicazione, for the positions of Staff but he left in 1877. Nava was promoted to captain in August 1878 and he passed through the Staff Corps and served first in the Alessandria Division and then in the command of the III Corps. He became major in October 1885, serving as battalion commander in the 4th Infantry Regiment "Piedmont".

== Service in Ethiopia ==
After the Battle of Dogali, fought on January 26, 1887, the new head of government Francesco Crispi decided to continue the hostilities by sending an expeditionary force of 20,000 men, of which he became assigned to the command of the special corps, as Chief of Staff of the African troops. Starting from October of the same year, he participated in some war operations in the context of the Italo-Ethiopian War of 1887–1889, including the Battle of Saati, as commander of the Bersaglieri battalion of the 1st Regiment "Hunters of Africa". He returned to Italy in May 1888 to serve first at the 7th, and then at the 9th Army Corps. In November 1889, he was promoted to lieutenant colonel, serving as Chief of Staff of the Milan Division.

In May 1890 he returned to Eritrea as a lieutenant colonel of staff, under the orders of General Alessandro Asinari di San Marzano, participating in the 1890–91 campaign as an officer assigned to the governor. He returned to Italy in April 1892 to be promoted to colonel on November 23, 1893. In January 1894, he became commander of the 40th Infantry Regiment "Bologna", then stationed in Milan. He returned to Eritrea in time to participate in the First Italo-Ethiopian War. He was assigned as the commander of the 5th Infantry Regiment of Africa, to the III Brigade of General Giuseppe Ellena. He reached the theater of operations on January 12, 1896, in time to take part in the Battle of Adwa, where he tried in vain to block the road to the enemy advance with a company of Alpini troops and the 16th Battalion of the 5th Infantry Regiment. Nava was then wounded by a spear blow and he was taken prisoner by Ras Mengesha Yohannes, who, before releasing him, reserved him a preferential treatment. For his service in Adwa, he obtained the Knight's Cross of the Military Order of Savoy.

In December 1897, he became honorary adjutant of King Umberto I. After his period in the service of the King, he returned to the General Staff, serving for three years as a military attaché at the Italian Embassy in Vienna. On April 19, 1900, he was elevated to the rank of major general and assumed command of the "Acqui" Brigade which he maintained until September 1906. He then assumed command of the Military Academy of Modena and on April 10, 1907, he was promoted to lieutenant general. From 1909 to 1910, he was in command of the 15th Division in Florence and from September 30, 1910, of the 11th Army Corps in Bari. From 17 December 1911 to 1 October 1914 he was commander of the 6th Army Corps in Bologna, and on August 30, he received the designation of possible army commander in case of war under Giovanni Giolitti.

== World War I ==
With the Italian entry into World War I, on May 24, 1915, he assumed command of the 4th Army, with its headquarters in Vittorio Veneto, which deployed its forces from Passo Cereda to Monte Peralba on a front of about 75 km. General Luigi Cadorna, supreme commander of the Royal Italian Army, began an offensive against Austria-Hungary starting with the conquest of the forts of Sexten, Landro and Valparola. The first objective of the operations was to take possession of the Toblach node on the right and on the left of the hills surrounding the Sella group.

His army failed to fulfill expectations, and he stood out, indeed, as the most wait-and-see of the Italian army commanders. At the end of June 1915, he requested the exemption of the subordinate general Pietro Marini, whose fault was having imprudently occupied the saddle of the Sasso di Stria and Cadorna, who did not share the esteem of which his subordinate was almost unanimously accredited, accepted the request. However, on September 25, of the same year Cadorna also exonerated him, replacing him with General Mario Nicolis di Robilant.

The official motivation was that: "In the first fifteen days of operations he did not act with promptness and energy, exploiting his superiority of forces, and he exercised the command with insufficient decision." In 1916, Nava was entrusted with the Presidency of the Central Health Commission, which he maintained until February 1917. From March 1, of the same year he was placed in the position of auxiliary service. In April 1918, he asked the new supreme commander of the army, General Armando Diaz, to be readmitted to the command of a mobilized unit. However, this proved to be almost impossible given the assignment previously carried out, and the lack of army commands available in the face of the abundance of other officers that wanted to lead them.

== Later years ==
In June 1919, he left active service, passing through the reserve and dedicating himself to the drafting of two volumes of memoirs, to which he entrusted the defense of his work, in particular against the accusations made by General Luigi Capello, who accused him of the excessive delay in the attack operations of the 4th army and of not having occupied the Cortina d'Ampezzo basin before the 13th day of the war. To the accusations, he replied by arguing the delay and the numerical insufficiency of the siege artillery park that had been made available to him, without which it was criminally unrealistic to face the permanent works and field defenses prepared by the Austrians in Cadore and in the Ampezzano area.

The two volumes, like other polemical writings by generals exonerated during the First World War, did not have much circulation. On June 2, 1921, he was definitively retired due to his service length and enrolled in the roles of the reserve, where in November 1924 he was nominated as army general, with seniority from February 1 of the previous year. Two years later, he also managed to have the partial revision of his exemption provision, which recognized him as active service from March 1, 1917, to June 11, 1919. He died in Alessandria on July 9, 1928.

== Awards ==
- Military Order of Savoy, Knight
- War Merit Cross (April 9, 1919)
- Order of the Crown of Italy, Knight Grand Cross (1913)
  - Grand Officer (1904)
  - Commander
  - Officer
  - Knight
- Order of Saints Maurice and Lazarus, Commander (1909)
  - Officer
  - Knight

== Works ==
- L'armata sarda nella giornata del 24 giugno 1859, Voghera, 1907. (reprinted in anastatic edition, s.l. 2010)
- Il combattimento di Montebello, 20 maggio 1859, Modena, 1909.
- Le giornate di Custoza. Campagna di guerra del 1848. Estratto da memorie storico-militari, Città di Castello 1911.
- Contronote di guerra, Raselli, Cherasco, 1920.
- Operazioni militari della 4ª Armata nei primi quattro mesi della campagna di guerra 1915, Raselli, Cherasco, 1922.
