= Fort Corte =

Austro-Hungarian fortification in the Trentino

Coordinates: 46°29′48″N 11°55′34″E

Fort Corte (Italian: Forte Corte, Forte La Corte, German: Werk La Corte) is an Austro-Hungarian fortification built on the slopes of Col di Lana in what is now Northern Italy. Fort Corte was built alongside the Ruaz roadblock to guard Val di Livinallongo. Corte was built in Subrayon V, which was one of five defensive sectors located in Trentino. Corte was built between 1897 and 1900, to guard the Campolongo Pass leading to the Pusteria Valley along with the Livinallongo Valley. During the beginning of the war, the fort was disarmed, unbeknownst to the Italians.

On July 5, 1915, Italian 21 cm guns shelled the fort, severely damaging it.

The fort has three levels, one of them being underground. Like most Austrian forts of its time, it was made out of large granite blocks.

== Armament ==
Guns were emplaced in the fort in 1902. They consisted of two 15 cm M80 mortar (weapon)s in armored domes, four 12 cm M96 guns in casemates, and eight M93 8mm machineguns.

The fort had a Daimler engine for generating power. With the outbreak of war with Russia, the fort was put on alert, so it was fully ready when the Italians declared war in May 1915. The machine guns were removed before the other guns in 1915. The fort was not bombarded by the Italian army after the Battle of Caporetto in 1917.

== Post-war ==
After the war, the fort was reportedly used to house residents of the village of Corte while rebuilding the village of Fodom.
