= Ruaz roadblock =

Austro-Hungarian fortification near Col Di Lana, Italy

Ruaz Roadblock is an Austro-Hungarian fortification built in Subrayon V of the Austro-Hungarian fortifications on the Italian border. The roadblock was built between 1897 and 1900, on the slopes of Col Di Lana, 1400m above sea level, in what is now Northern Italy. Along with Fort Corte, the Ruaz roadblock made up the Buchensteinal wall. Ruaz had the job of controlling the Cordevole Valley and the road from Livinallongo to Arabba. Ruaz was armed with 6 unspecified guns all facing towards the Italian border.

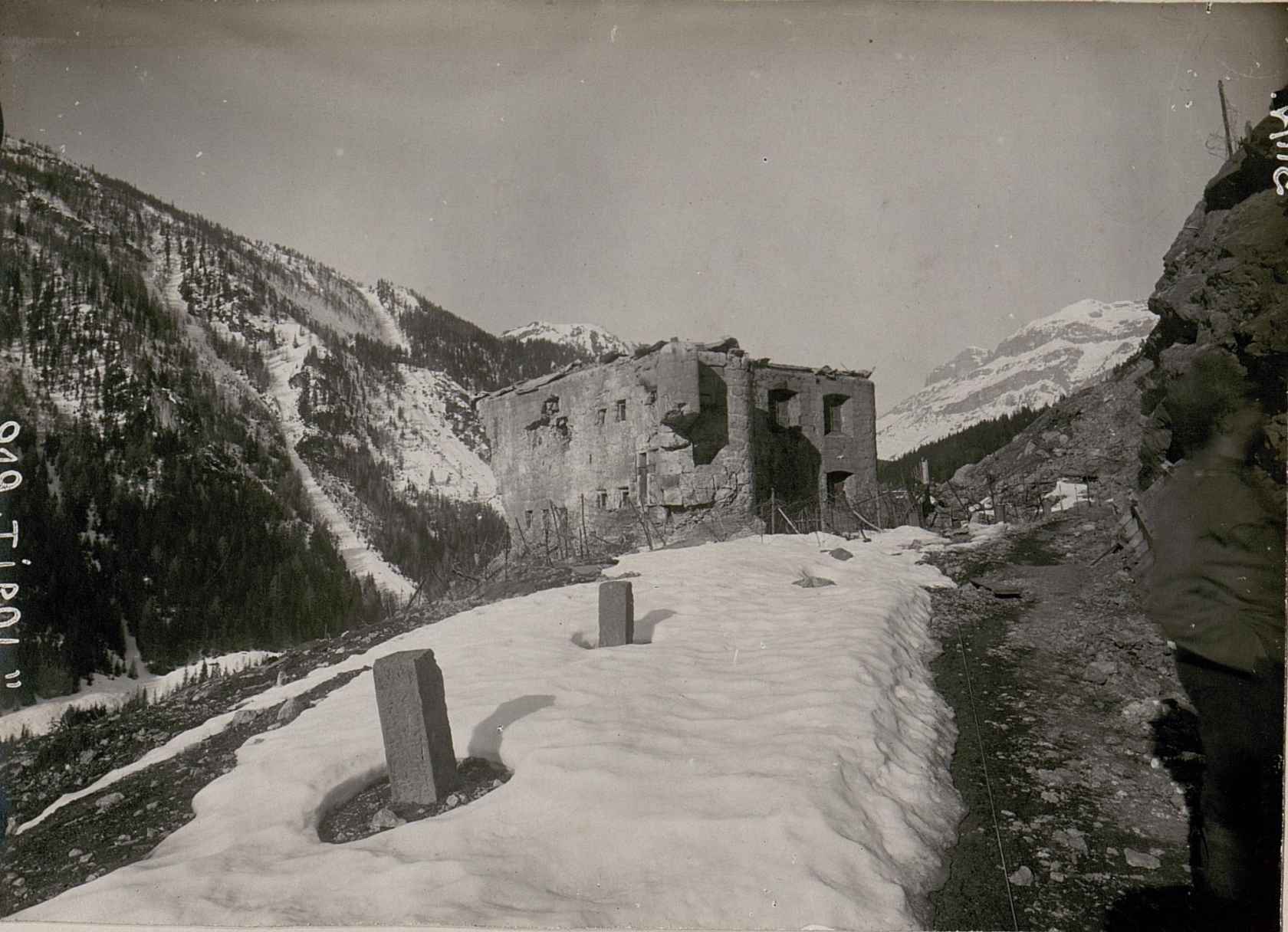
Roadblock Ruaz during the war.

== World War I ==
The roadblock was relatively weak at the beginning of the war, and the Italians would have been able to overrun Corte and Ruaz easily and capture Col Di Lana, a major mountain with views over the local mountain passes. Instead, the Italian Chief of General Staff, Luigi Cadorna, thought that a decisive battle would be fought on the Isonzo River to the southeast. The lack of exploitation of the Austrian weakness led to months of bloody fighting on Col Di Lana, eventually earning the mountain the name Col di Sangue “Blood Mountain”.

== Post-war ==
In 1972, Ruaz was renovated by the Waillant family and turned into a restaurant. The restaurant is linked to the hotel by a secret passage from the original fortification. 2 Austrian 10 cm guns are located in the square outside.
