= Silver age of alpinism =

Era in mountaineering that began in 1865 and ended in 1882

The silver age of alpinism is the name given in the United Kingdom to the era in mountaineering that began after Edward Whymper and party's ascent of the Matterhorn in 1865 and ended with W. W. Graham and party's ascent of the Dent du Géant in 1882.

Whilst the golden age of alpinism (1854–1865) was characterised by the first ascents of many of the greatest Alpine peaks, the subsequent silver age may be seen as consisting of the first ascents of the many worthwhile peaks left unclimbed, although these peaks were – and remained – largely unknown to the wider public in Britain.

Once these peaks had been climbed, many ambitious alpinists turned their attention to more distant and often loftier ranges, such as the Caucasus, the Andes, the Rockies and, latterly, the Himalayas.

Prominent alpinists and guides of the period include Christian Almer, Melchior Anderegg, Hermann von Barth, Alexander Burgener, W. A. B. Coolidge, Henri Cordier, Clinton Thomas Dent, James Eccles, D. W. Freshfield, Pierre Gaspard, Paul Grohmann, Paul Güssfeldt, Michael Innerkofler, John Oakley Maund, Thomas Middlemore, A. W. Moore, Albert F. Mummery, Julius Payer and William Penhall.

== First ascents in the silver age ==
- 1865 Aiguille du Chardonnet, Lauterbrunnen Breithorn, Cima Tosa, Dammastock, Grünhorn, Hochfeiler, Monte Cevedale, Monte Cristallo, Nesthorn, Tschingelhorn, Vertainspitze
- 1866 Dreiherrnspitze, Gross Litzner, Monte Zebrù, Piz Cengalo, Piz Platta, Piz Palü (1868?)
- 1867 Cima Piazzi, Civetta, Gletscherhorn, Hintere Schwärze, Olperer, Piz Badile, Pizzo Campo Tencia
- 1868 Bellavista, Ebnefluh, Grandes Jorasses, Hochgall
- 1869 Dreischusterspitze, Ellmauer Halt, Gspaltenhorn, Große Zinne, Großes Seehorn, Hochfrottspitze, Hohberghorn, Langkofel, Parseierspitze, Thurwieserspitze, Watzespitze
- 1870 Ailefroide, Cimon della Pala, Lenzspitze
- 1871 Aiguille du Plan, Dreitorspitze, Portjengrat, Trugberg, Waxenstein
- 1872 Glocknerwand, Trafoier Eiswand, Vezzana
- 1873 Aiguille de Rochefort, Hinterer Brunnenkogel, Le Râteau
- 1874 Aiguille de Triolet, Pflerscher Tribulaun, Rosengartenspitze, Zwölferkofel
- 1875 Roche de la Muzelle, Sass Maor
- 1876 Aiguille du Plat de la Selle, Les Droites, Mont Collon
- 1877 Aiguille Noire de Peuterey, La Meije, Pic Coolidge, Piz Scerscen
- 1878 Aiguilles d'Arves, Aiguille du Dru, Elferkofel, Les Bans, Mont Maudit, Sextener Rotwand
- 1879 Cima Ovest, Dürrenhorn, Monte Argentera, Petit Dru
- 1880 Aiguille des Grands Charmoz, Fußstein, Grohmannspitze, Olan
- 1881 Aiguille du Grépon, Dôme de Rochefort, Kleine Zinne, Totenkirchl
- 1882 Dent du Géant, Paternkofel

A number of high, major summits were reached at a still later date, including the Aiguille Blanche de Peuterey (1885). Many technically challenging peaks, especially in the Dolomites, defeated climbers into the 20th century, with Campanile Basso (1899), de:Campanile di Val Montanaia (1902), Torre Venezia (1909), Torre Trieste (1910) and Aiguille Dibona (Angelo Dibona - 1913) perhaps being the last big prizes.

== See also ==
- Exploration of the High Alps
- Golden age of alpinism
