= Torre dei Scarperi =

Mountain in Italy

- German: Schwabenalpenkopf
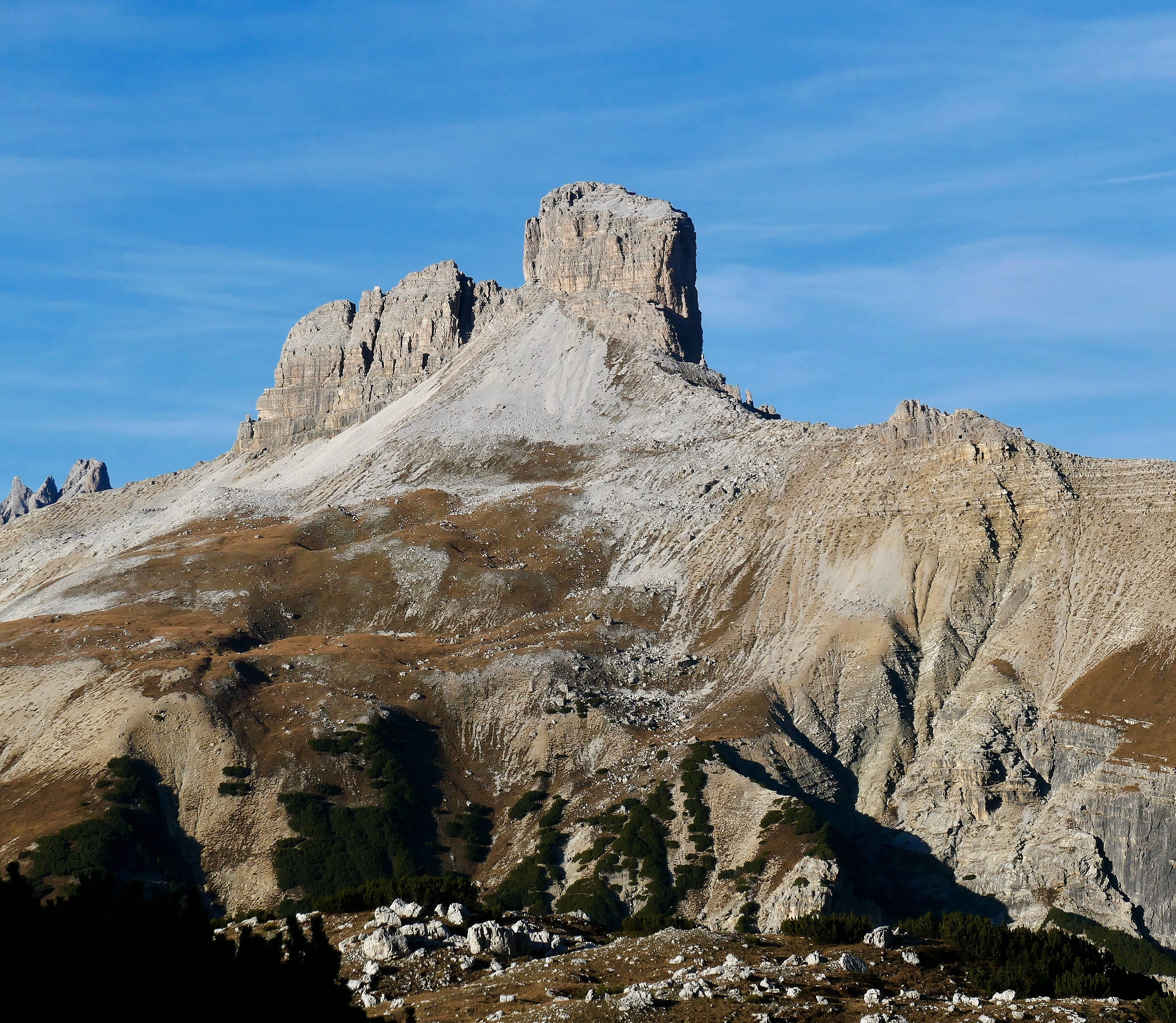
- South aspect

Highest point
- Elevation: 2,687 m (8,816 ft)
- Prominence: 300 m (984 ft)
- Parent peak: Zwölferkofel
- Isolation: 1.39 km (0.86 mi)
- Coordinates: 46°38′42″N 12°17′13″E

Geography
- Location within Italy
- Interactive map of Torre dei Scarperi
- Country: Italy
- Province: South Tyrol
- Protected area: Drei Zinnen / Tre Cime Nature Park
- Parent range: Dolomites; Sexten Dolomites
- Topo map: Tabacco 010 Sextener Dolomiten/Dolomiti di Sesto

Geology
- Rock age: Triassic
- Rock type: Dolomite

Climbing
- First ascent: 1883

Torre dei Scarperi is a mountain in the province of South Tyrol in northern Italy.

== Description ==
Torre dei Scarperi, also known as Schwabenalpenkopf in German, is a 2,687-meter-elevation (8,816-foot) summit in the Sexten Dolomites subrange of the Dolomites, a UNESCO World Heritage Site. Set in the Trentino-Alto Adige/Südtirol region, the peak is located 10 kilometers (6 miles) south of the municipality of Innichen, and the peak is within Drei Zinnen / Tre Cime Nature Park. Precipitation runoff from the peak drains into tributaries of the Drava. Topographic relief is significant as the summit rises nearly 900 meters (2,953 feet) above the Rienz Valley in one kilometer (0.6 mile). The first ascent of the summit was made on July 21, 1883, by Mitzl Eckerth, Michael Innerkofler, and Josef Innerkofler. The Italian toponym translates as "shoe" (scarpa) "tower" (torre). The nearest higher neighbor is Croda dei Rondoi, 1.39 kilometers (0.87 mile) to the west-northwest.

== Climate ==
Based on the Köppen climate classification, Torre dei Scarperi is located in an alpine climate zone with long, cold winters, and short, mild summers. Weather systems are forced upwards by the mountains (orographic lift), causing moisture to drop in the form of rain and snow. The months of June through September offer the most favorable weather for visiting or climbing in this area.

== Gallery ==
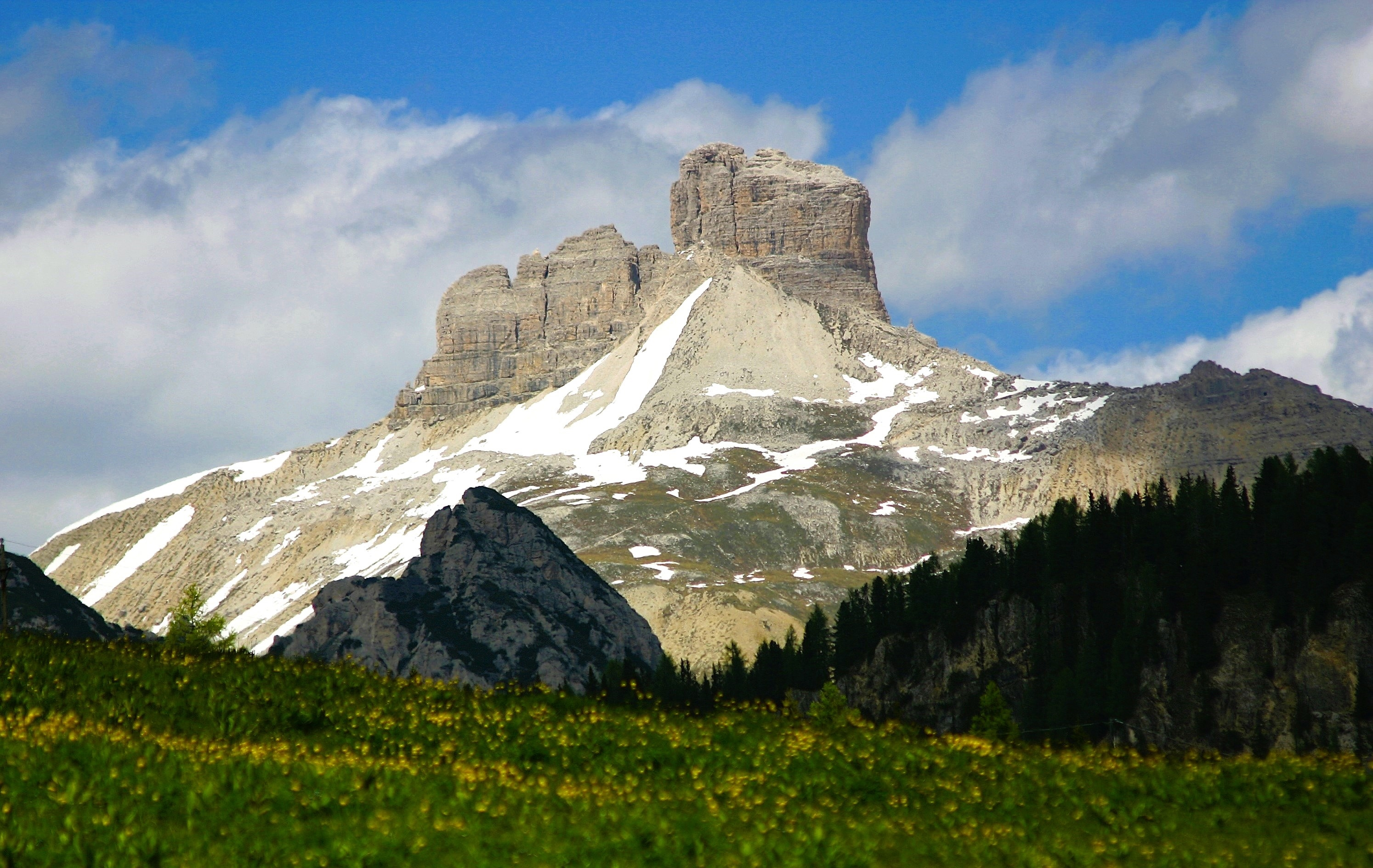
South aspect

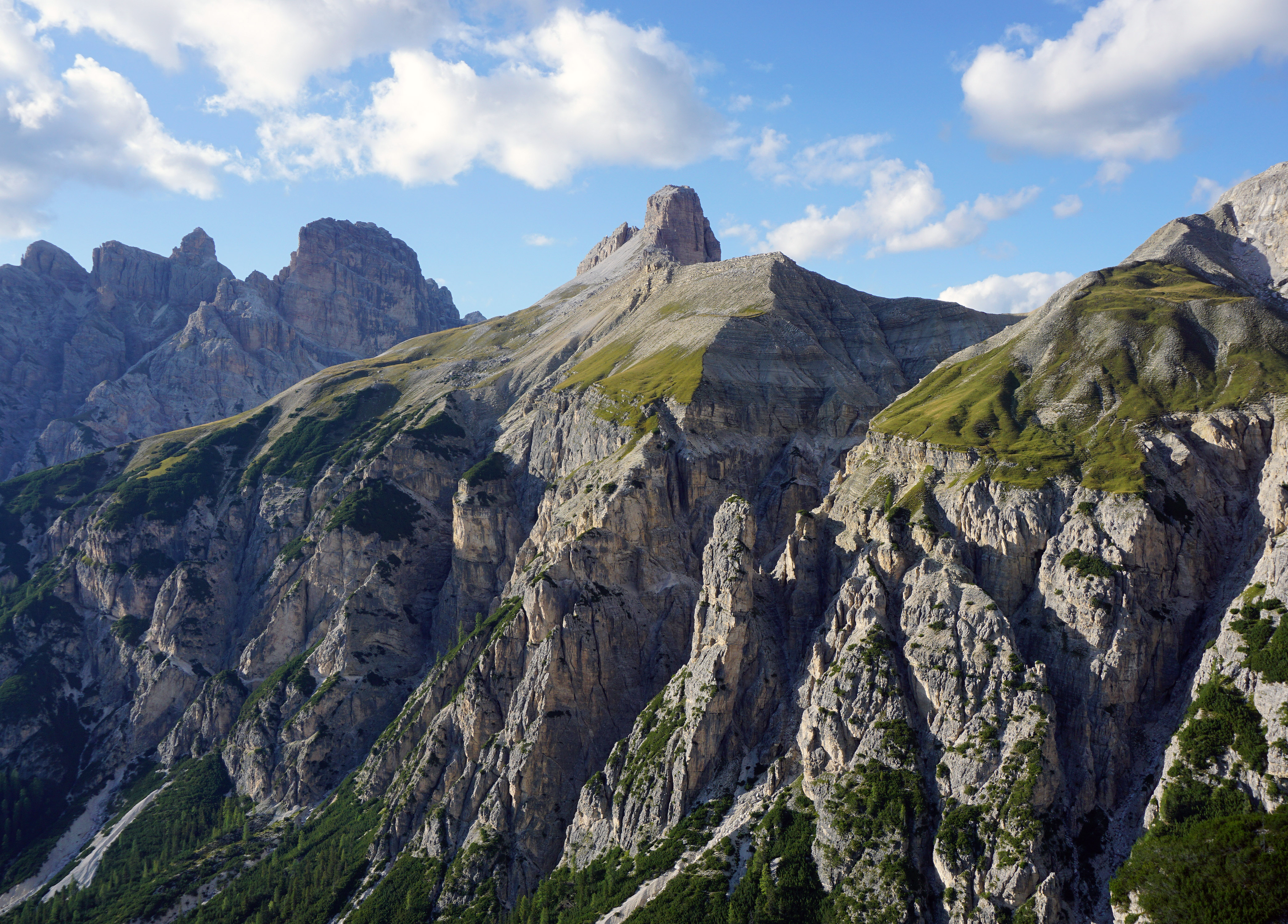
Southeast aspect (with Croda dei Rondoi behind, left)

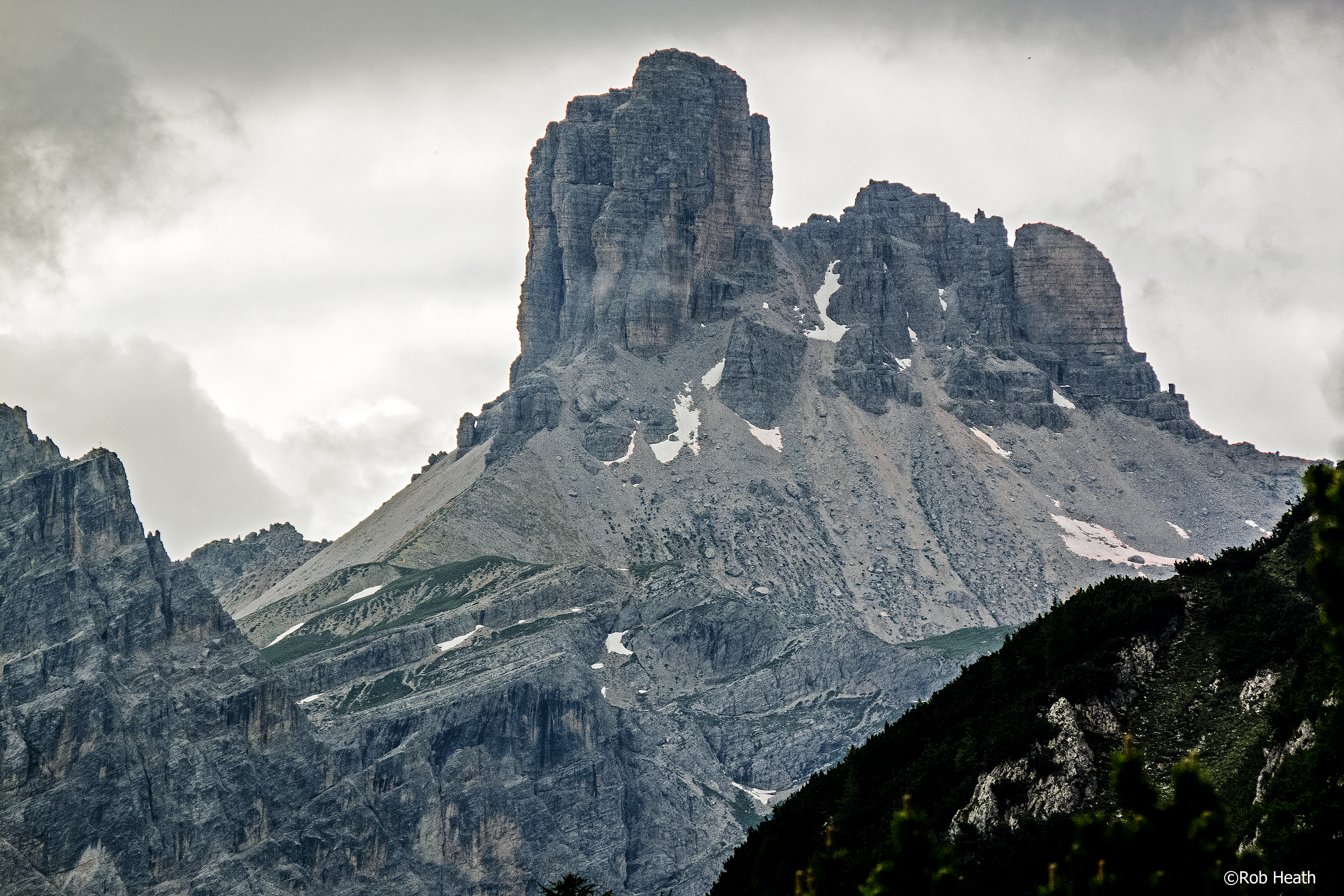
North aspect

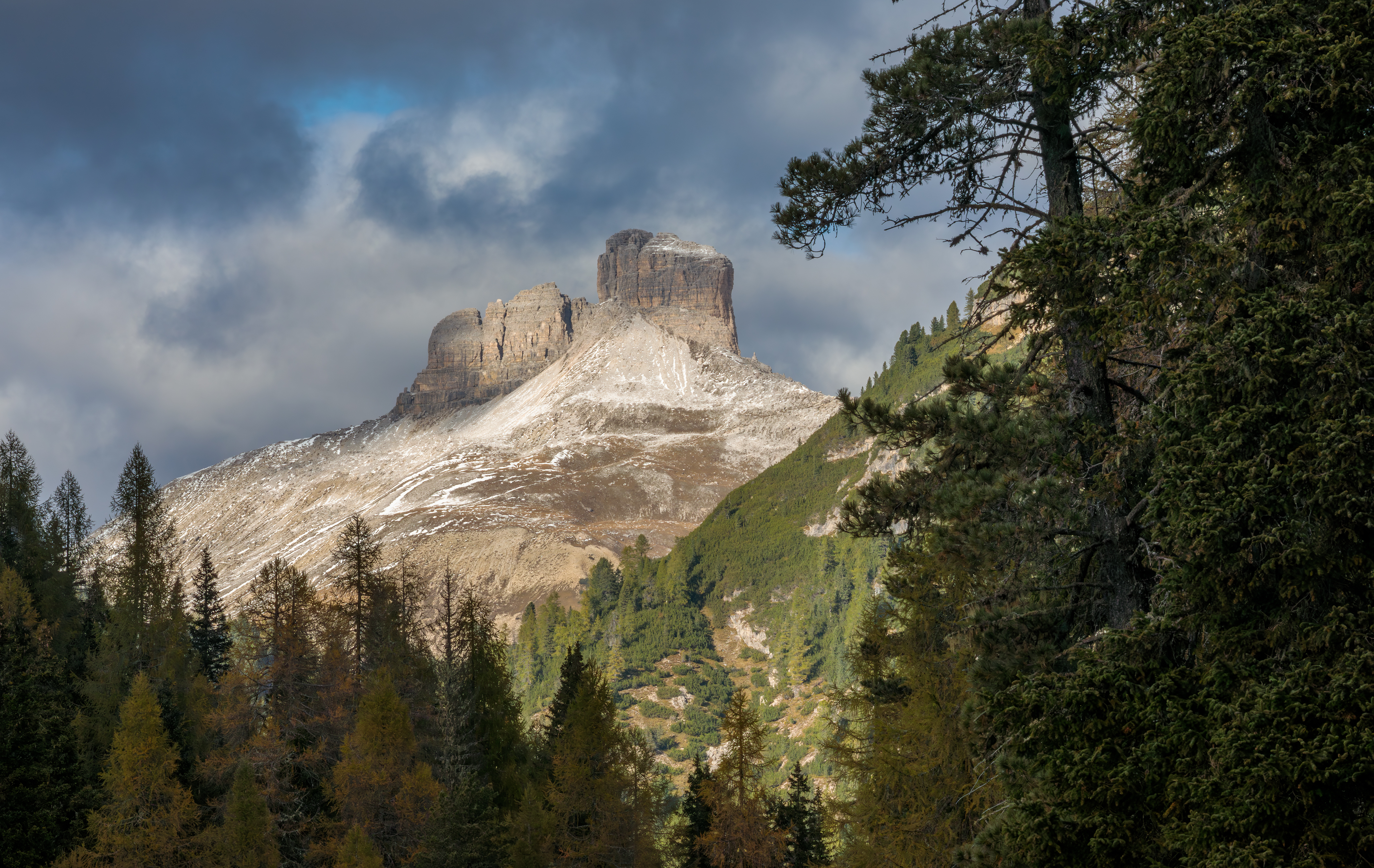
South aspect

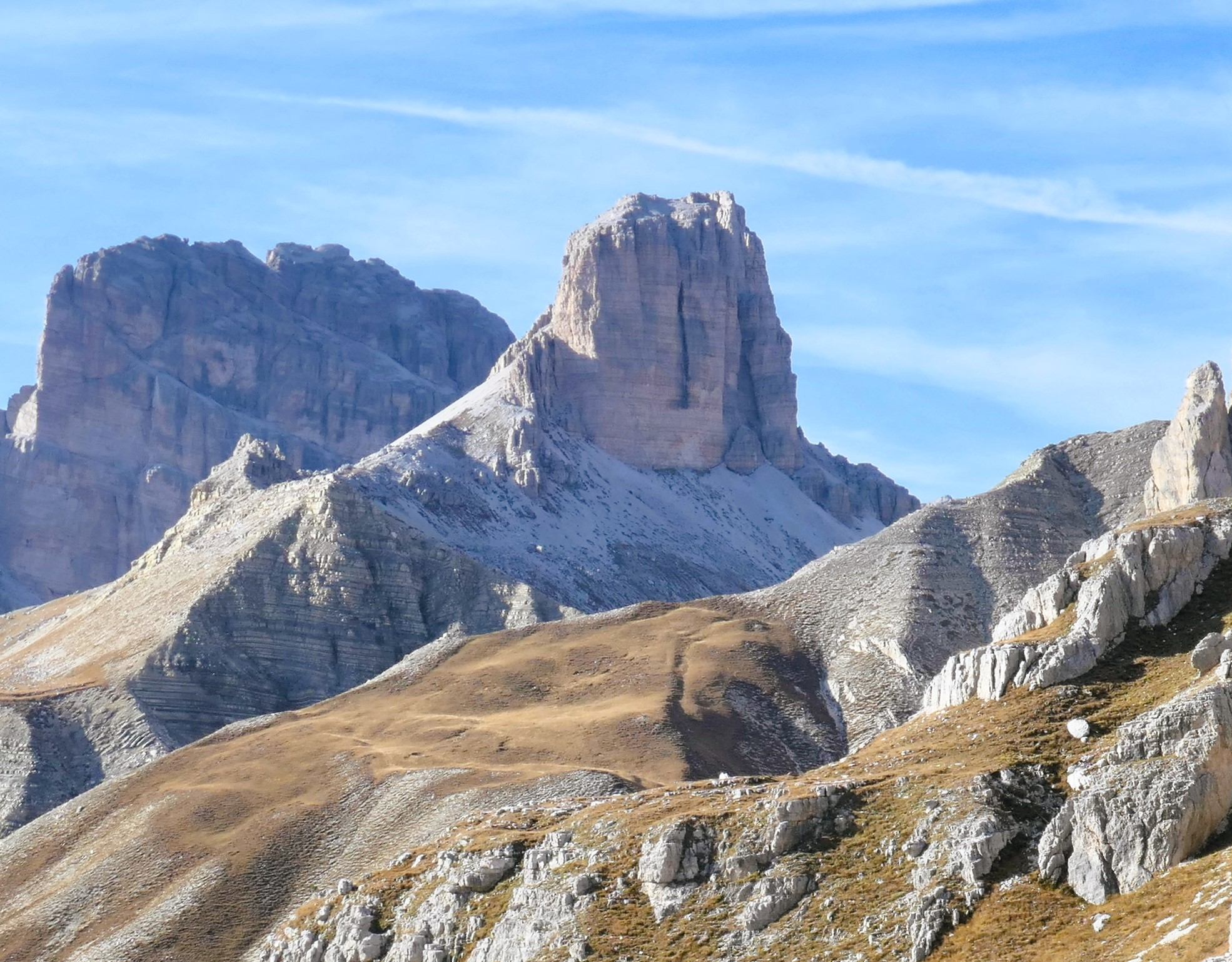
East aspect (centered) with Croda dei Rondoi behind

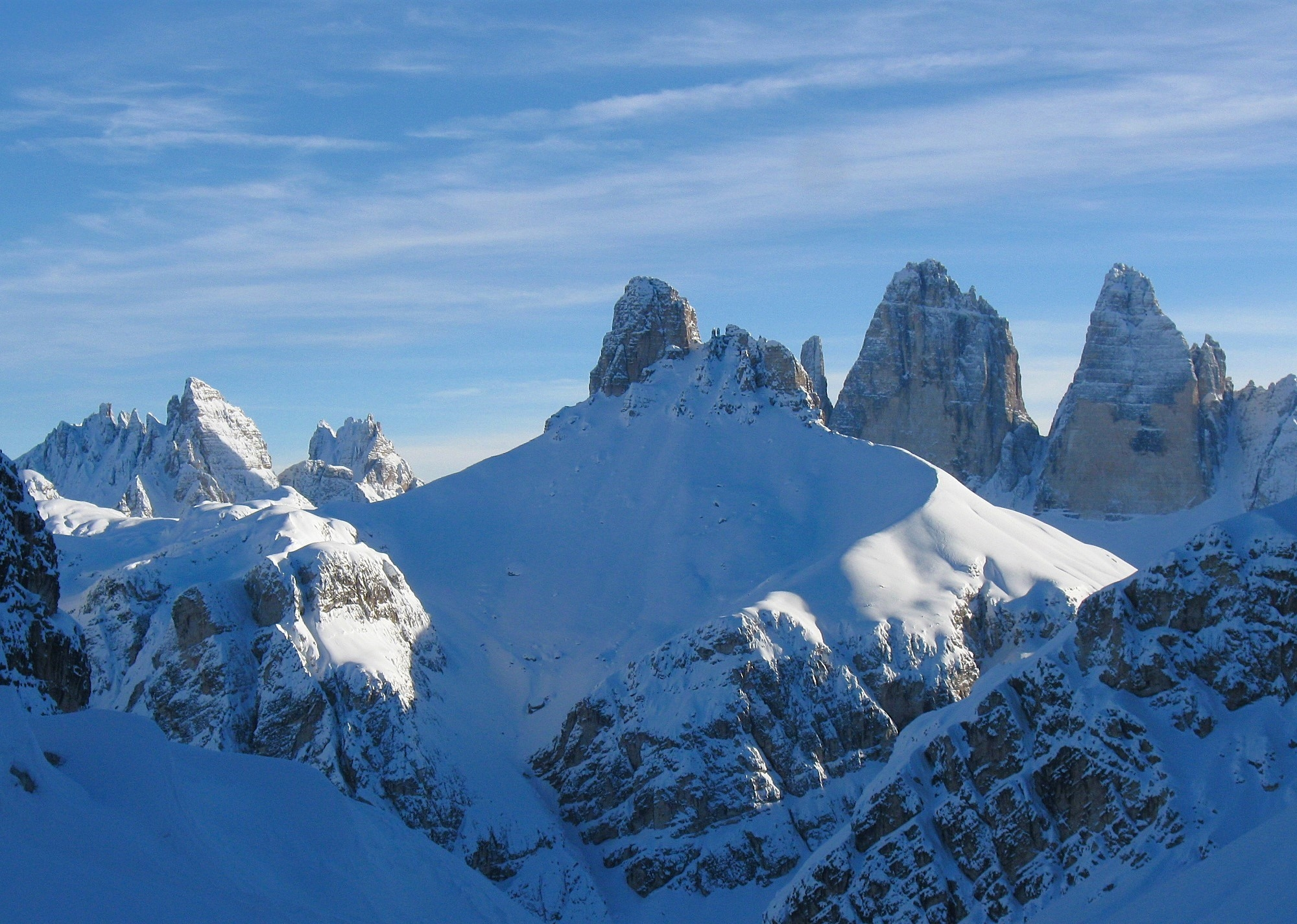
Northwest aspect, centered

== See also ==
- Southern Limestone Alps
