= Torre di Toblin =

Mountain in Italy

- German: Toblinger Knoten
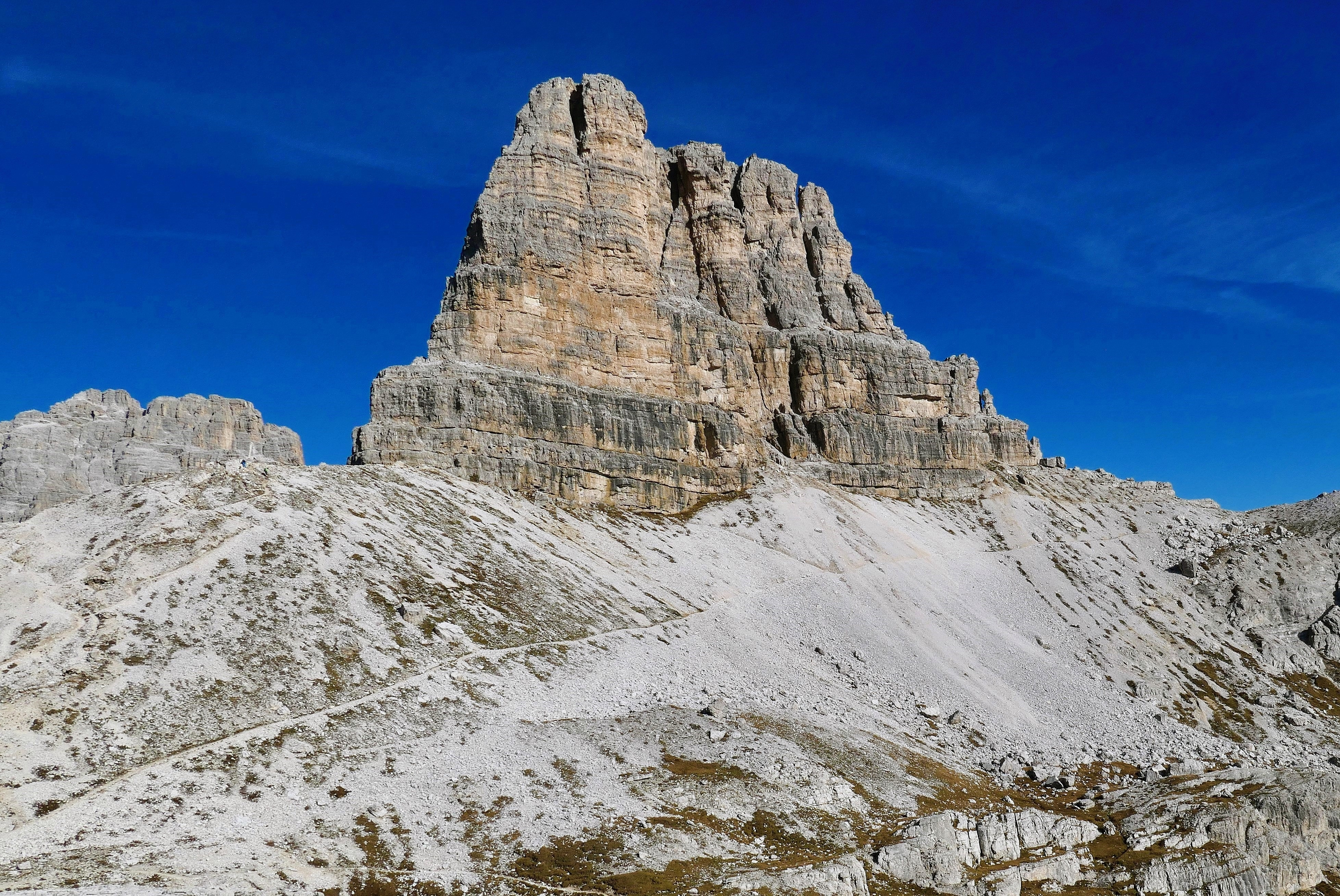
- West aspect

Highest point
- Elevation: 2,630 m (8,629 ft)
- Prominence: 235 m (771 ft)
- Parent peak: Zwölferkofel
- Isolation: 1.394 km (0.866 mi)
- Coordinates: 46°38′31″N 12°18′29″E

Geography
- Location within Italy
- Interactive map of Torre di Toblin
- Country: Italy
- Province: South Tyrol
- Protected area: Drei Zinnen / Tre Cime Nature Park
- Parent range: Dolomites; Sexten Dolomites
- Topo map: Tabacco 010 Sextener Dolomiten/Dolomiti di Sesto

Geology
- Rock age: Triassic
- Rock type: Dolomite

Climbing
- First ascent: 1885

Torre di Toblin is a mountain in the province of South Tyrol in northern Italy.

== Description ==
Torre di Toblin, also known as Toblinger Knoten in German, is a 2,630-meter-elevation (8,629-foot) summit in the Sexten Dolomites subrange of the Dolomites, a UNESCO World Heritage Site. Set in the Trentino-Alto Adige/Südtirol region, the peak is located seven kilometers (4.35 miles) south-southwest of the village of Sexten, and the peak is within Drei Zinnen / Tre Cime Nature Park. Precipitation runoff from the peak drains into tributaries of the Drava. Topographic relief is significant as the summit rises 630 meters (2,067 feet) above the Rienz Valley in one kilometer (0.6 mile). The first ascent of the east summit was made in 1885 by Michael Innerkofler and Wenzel Eckerth via the northeast side, whereas the west summit was first climbed on July 22, 1892, by Sepp Innerkofler and Leon Treptow via the northwest ridge. The Italian toponym translates as "Toblin Tower." The peak was a strategic artillery observation post used by the Austro-Hungarian Army during the White War of World War I. The nearest higher neighbor is Monte Paterno, 1.39 kilometers (0.87 mile) to the south-southeast.

== Climate ==
Based on the Köppen climate classification, Torre di Toblin is located in an alpine climate zone with long, cold winters, and short, mild summers. Weather systems are forced upwards by the mountains (orographic lift), causing moisture to drop in the form of rain and snow. The months of June through September offer the most favorable weather for visiting or climbing in this area.

== Gallery ==
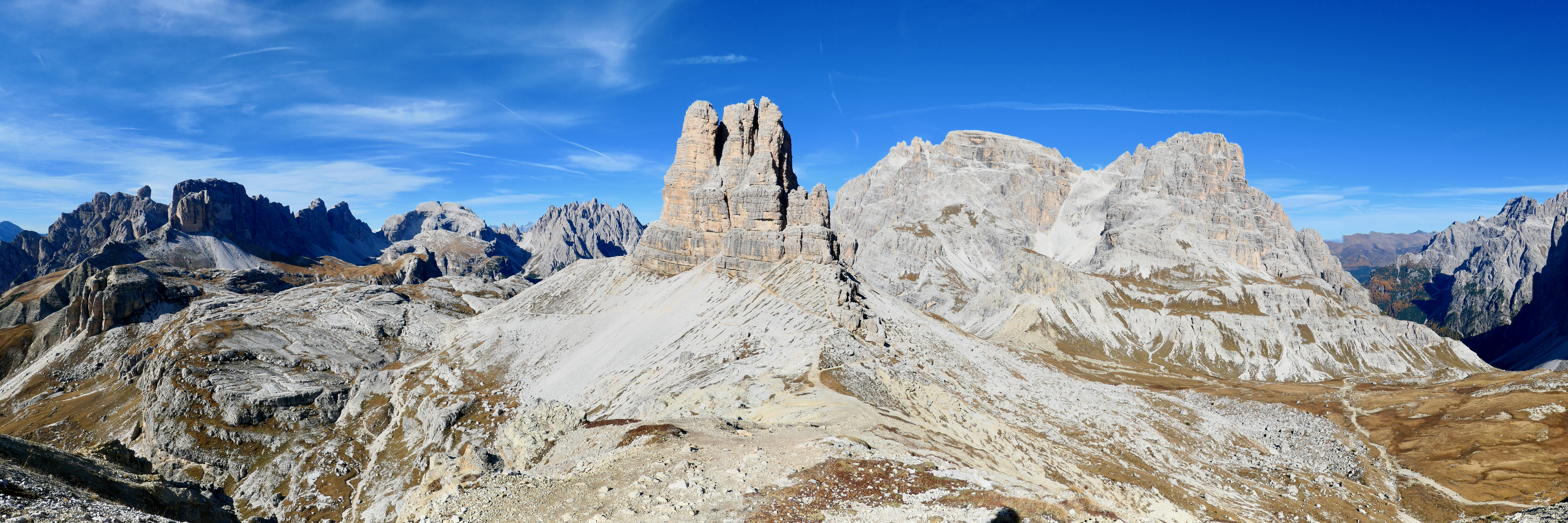
Torre di Toblin centered

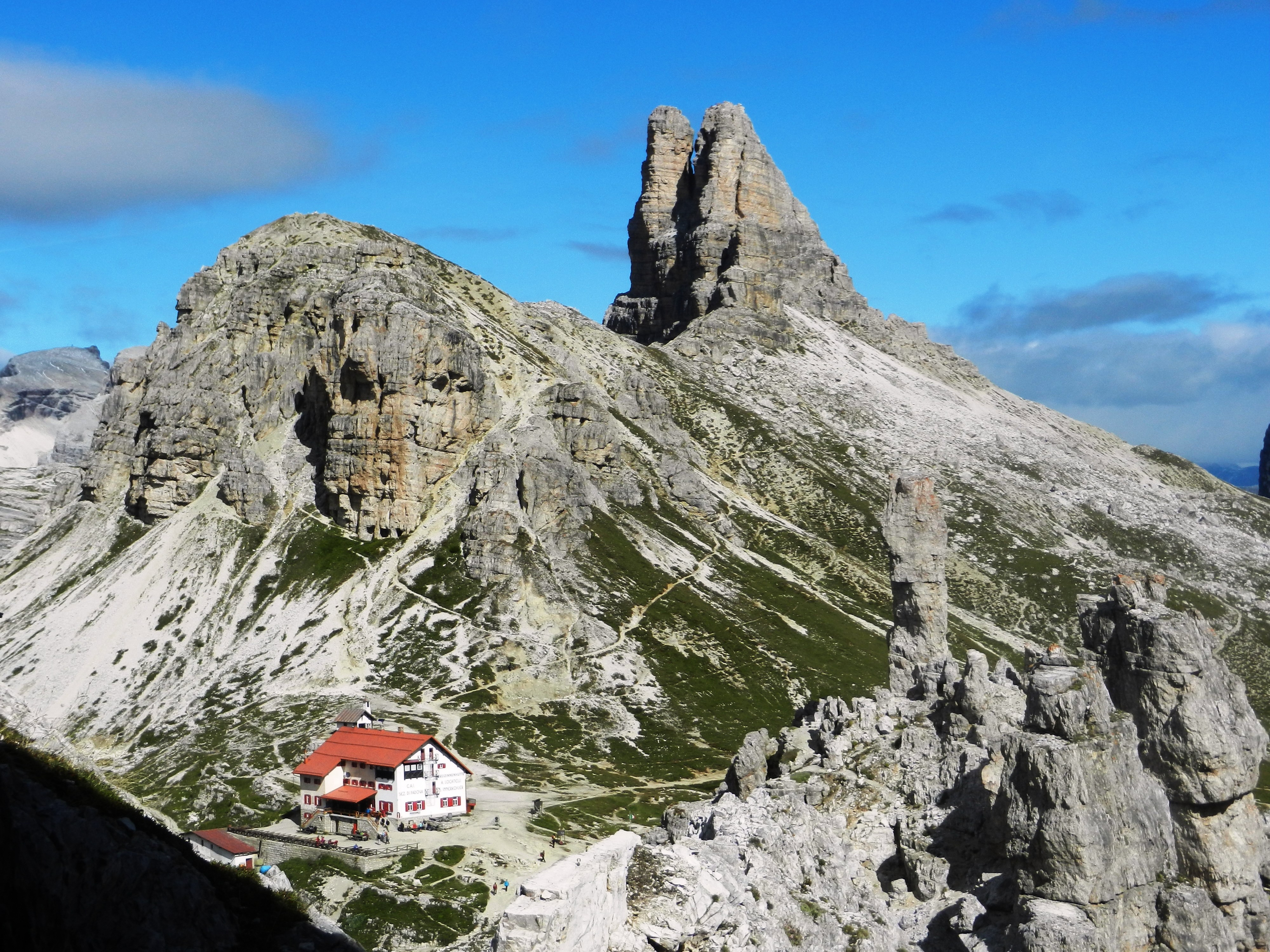

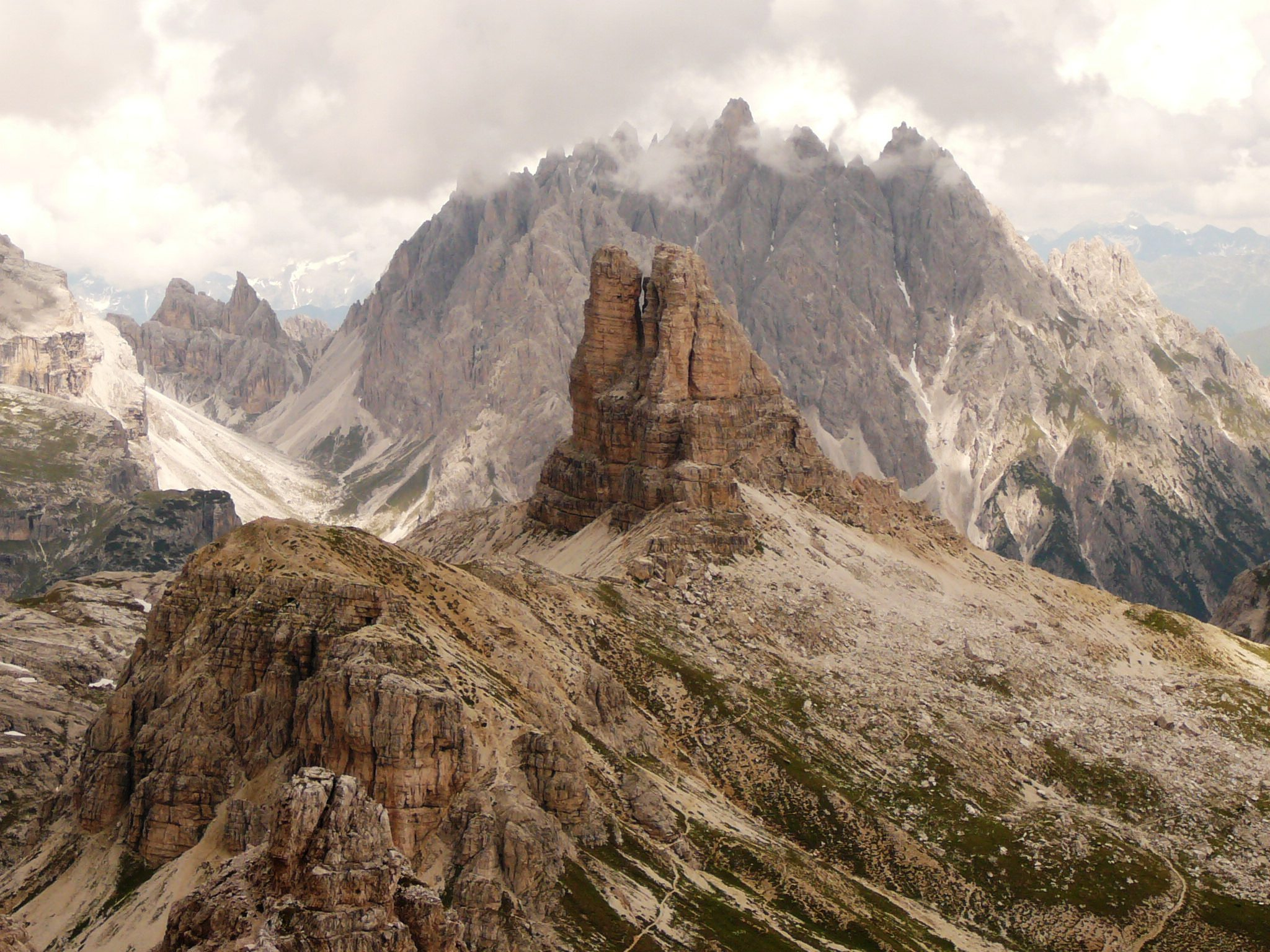
Torre di Toblin, with Haunold in background

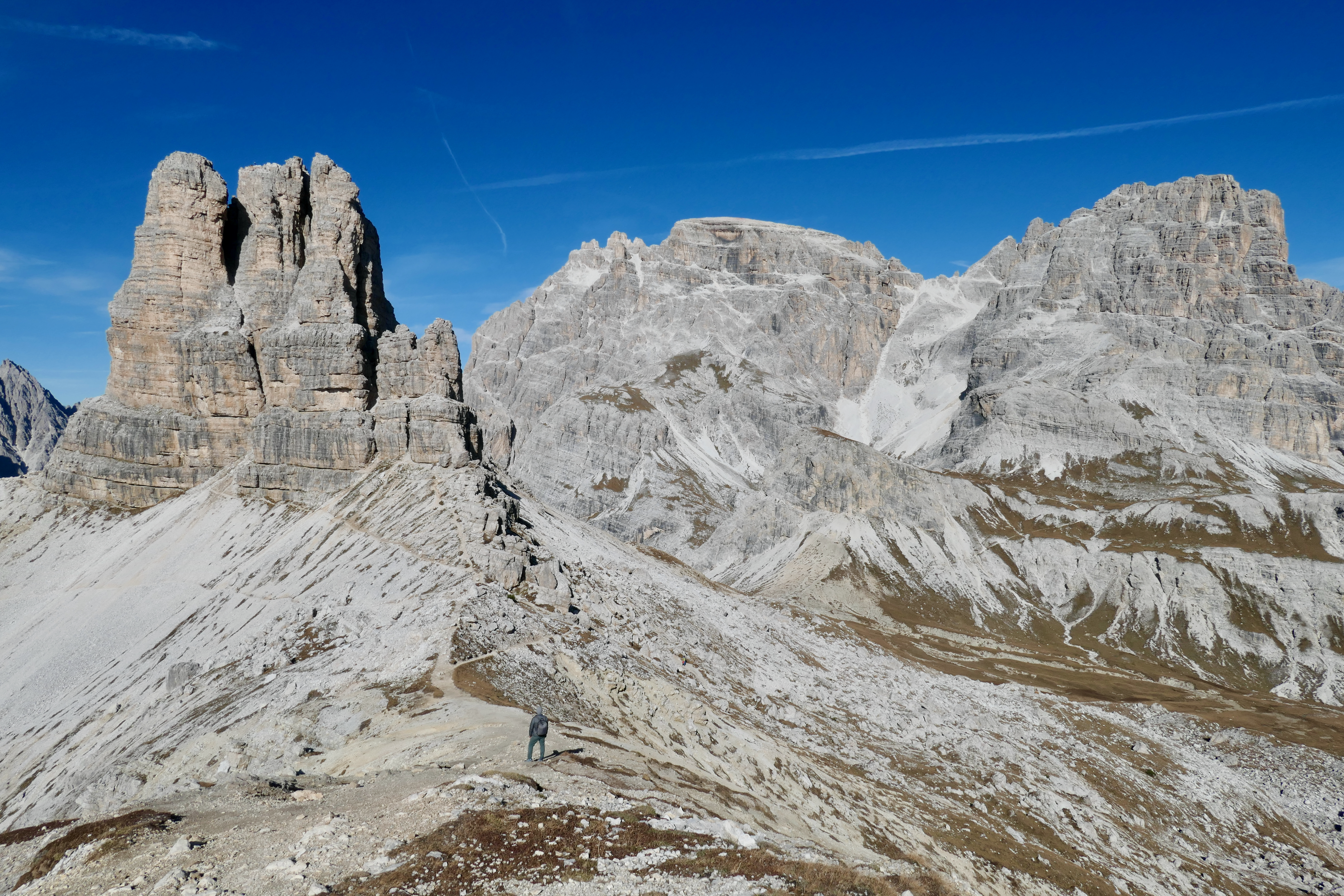
Torre di Toblin to left

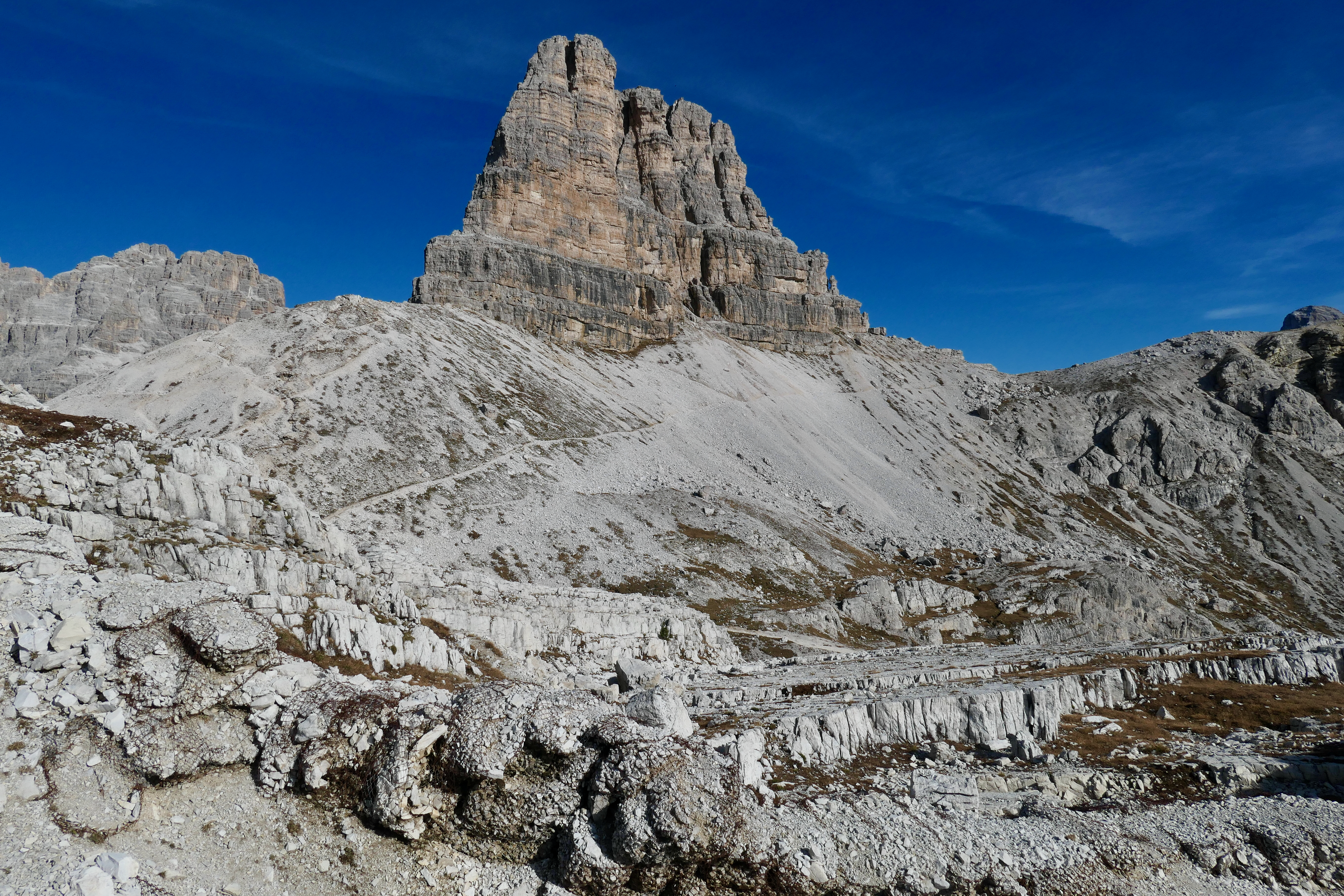
West aspect

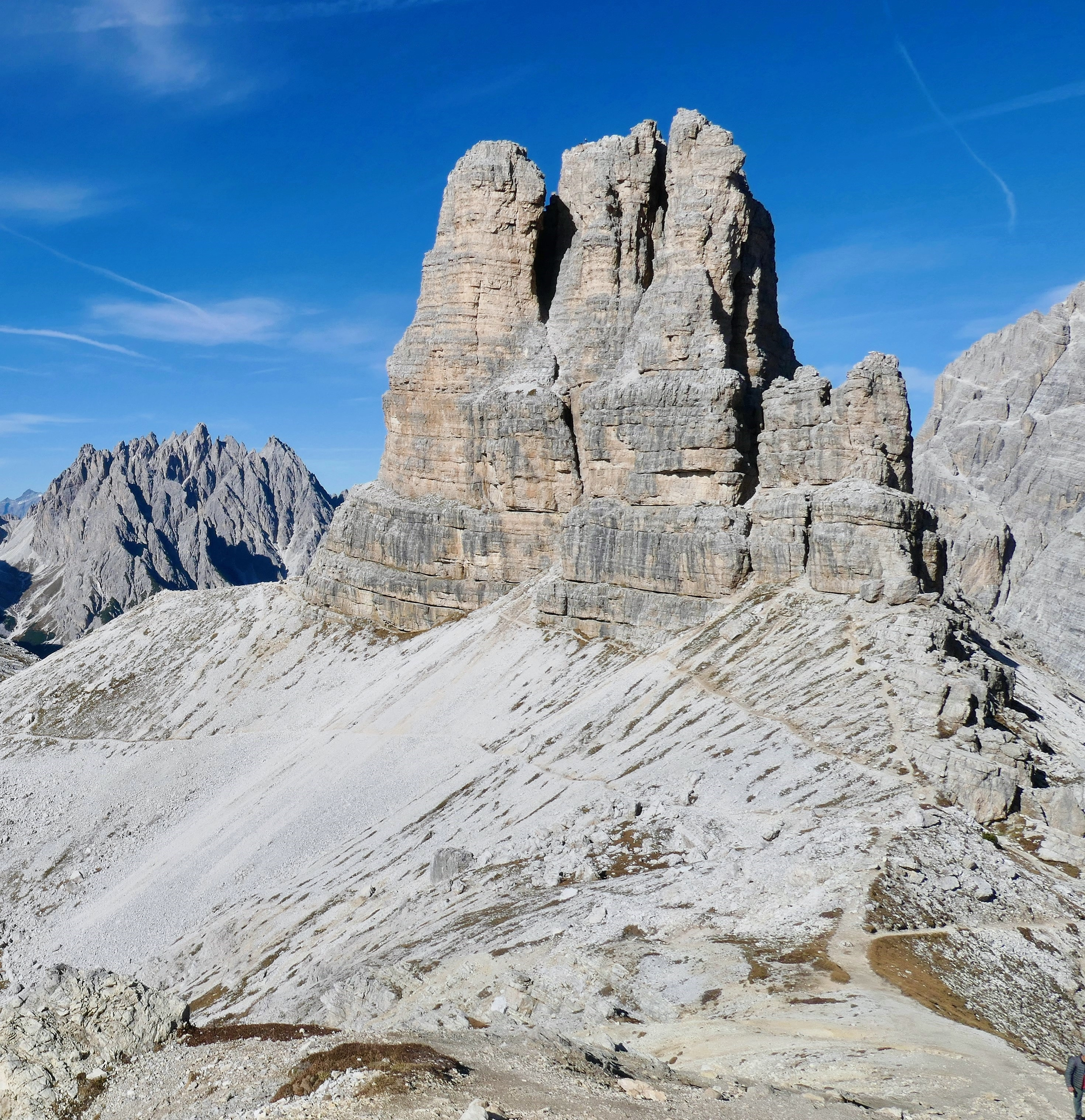
South aspect

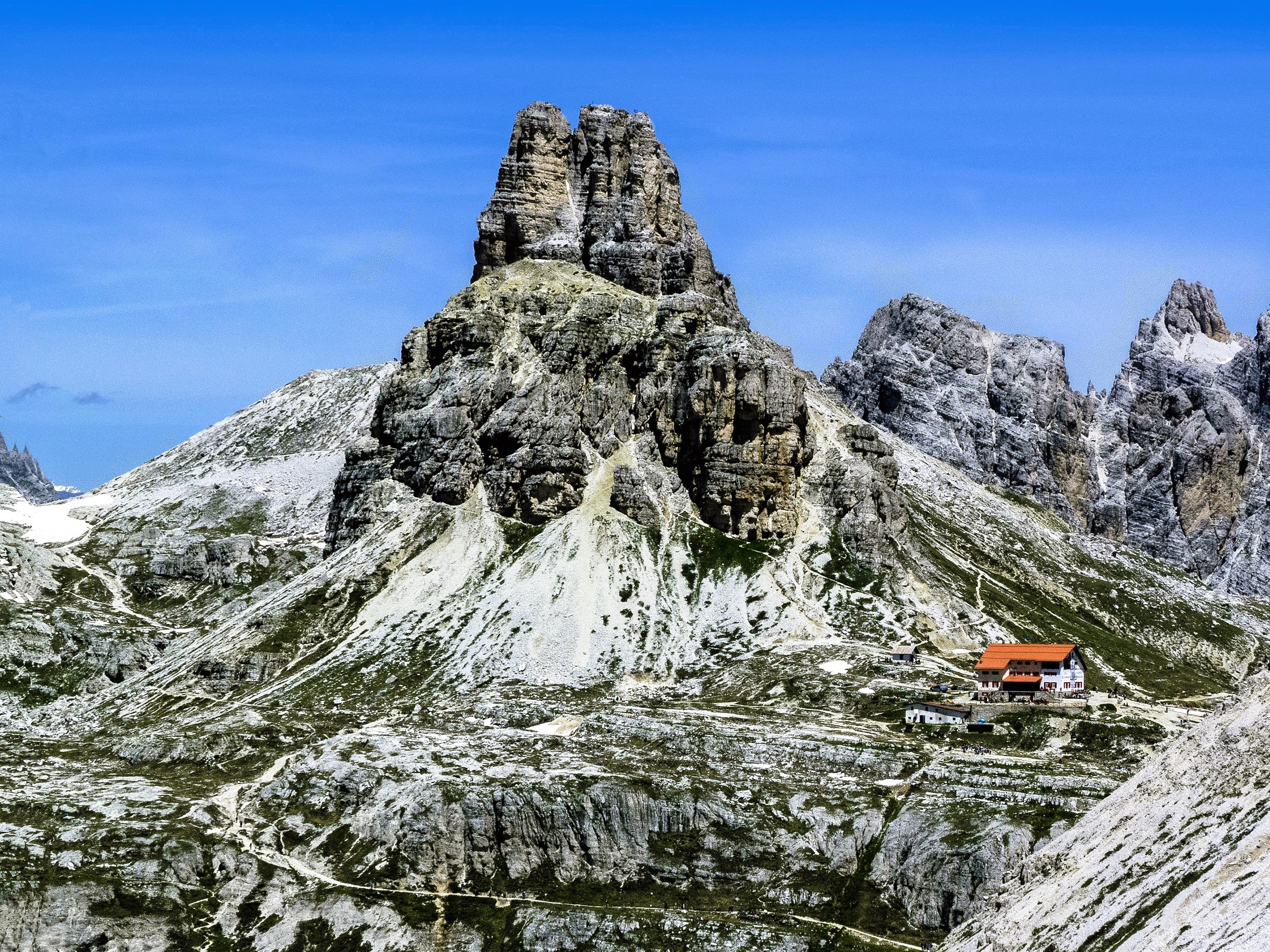
Torre di Toblin directly above Sasso di Sesto with Rifugio Locatelli to right

== See also ==
- Southern Limestone Alps
