= Peak Pursuits =

2020 book by Caroline Schaumann

Peak Pursuits: The Emergence of Mountaineering in the Nineteenth Century
- Cover
- Author: Caroline Schaumann
- Language: English
- Subject: Cultural history, Mountaineering
- Genre: Nonfiction
- Publisher: Yale University Press
- Publication date: July 28, 2020
- Publication place: United States
- Media type: Print, digital
- Pages: 384
- ISBN: 978-0-300-23194-6 (hardcover)

Peak Pursuits: The Emergence of Mountaineering in the Nineteenth Century is a 2020 book by German cultural historian, author, and academic Caroline Schaumann. Schaumann studies how climbers in Europe and North America engaged with mountain landscapes and how their representations shaped emerging attitudes toward nature that prevail to this day. The book provides a cultural history of nineteenth-century mountaineering.

== Summary ==
Schaumann traces the cultural, scientific, and aesthetic dimensions of mountaineering as they developed in Europe and North America during the nineteenth century. The author presents mountaineering not only as a physical activity but as a mode of engagement with nature shaped by shifting ideas of science, embodiment, and landscape. She draws on both published and unpublished writings, and studies how climbing practices and narratives intersected with broader intellectual and social currents.

Instead of following a strictly chronological or geographical structure, Schaumann organized the book around individual mountaineers, which allowed her to explore how mountain landscapes became sites of scientific inquiry, aesthetic reflection, and personal transformation.

The book is structured in three parts. The first part centers on Alexander von Humboldt and focuses on his expeditions to the Alps and the Andes, using newly available diaries to narrate experiences of physical vulnerability and scientific inquiry.

The second part turns to the European Alps and discusses figures such as Horace-Bénédict de Saussure, Edward Whymper, John Tyndall, and Leslie Stephen. This section situates the rise of Alpine tourism, the role of British amateur climbers, and developments in geological and atmospheric science within the context of elite leisure and expanding infrastructure.

The third part shifts to the American West, scrutinizing the writings and activities of Clarence King and John Muir. Here, Schaumann explores the formation of an American landscape aesthetic as well as the environmental consciousness shaped by transatlantic influences.

== Critical reception ==
The book received broadly positive reviews. Some scholars praised Schaumann's integration of literary analysis, environmental history, and cultural criticism to examine the embodied experiences of mountaineers such as Alexander von Humboldt, John Muir, and Edward Whymper.

Carmel Heeley praised the book as a beautifully written and richly interdisciplinary study that redefined the cultural history of mountaineering, calling it a fresh and engaging take on the history of mountaineering. Heeley appreciated how Schaumann used literary and artistic sources to show how nineteenth-century climbers—primarily European men—experienced mountains emotionally, physically, and intellectually. She thought one of the book's biggest contribution is moving away from usual focus on national pride or conquering nature and instead focusing on the emotional, personal and creative sides of climbing. Heeley found the final section on American mountaineering particularly effective in clarifying its differences from European traditions.

Eva-Maria Müller regarded the work as a significant contribution to mountain studies, especially for its focus on the embodied experience of mountaineering. Müller appreciated the author's shift away from dominant frameworks of empire and Romanticism, instead highlighting the "ambivalences, incongruities, and paradoxes of the sport." Müller praised the book’s literary and interdisciplinary scope, and highlighted its success in tracing how physical sensations shaped climbing narratives. She found its attention to marginalized perspectives—including fallen climbers, overlooked companions, and same-sex male friendships—both refreshing, novel and necessary. While she noted a limited engagement with critical theory, she acknowledged the strength of its close readings and its potential to "translate nineteenth-century incongruities to contemporary alpinist endeavors."

Alexander Philips praised the book's theoretical rigor, particularly its application of material ecocriticism, and found its framing within the Anthropocene both timely and meaningful.

Harri Salovaara praised Schaumann's treatment of race, class, and gender, and noted that she convincingly argued "the pursuit of science or mountaineering without an ecocritical awareness seems ignorant and inadequate." Salovaara regarded the work as a valuable ecocritical study that brought historical mountaineering literature into conversation with contemporary environmental discourse. He highlighted the analysis of human-nature "entanglement" and the critique of hegemonic masculinities as central strengths. While he observed the limited presence of women and Indigenous perspectives, he considered this a reflection of the historical record rather than a shortcoming of the work itself.

Marc Landry and Jon Mathieu commended the book's ambitious scope and thoughtful organization, and acknowledged its success in connecting European and American mountaineering traditions and its relevance to current environmental concerns. In his review, Michael Reidy noted the book's treatment of mountaineers as paradoxical figures, whose writings reflected both admiration for nature and complicity in its commodification.

Vanessa Heggie commended the author’s attention to the "haptic sublime" and noted that the analysis revealed how "the divisions between the stereotype of the rational, measuring scientist, and the embodied, romantic, climber are most obviously porous." Heggie viewed the work as a valuable synthesis that brought together multiple scholarly traditions, and praised its use of public and private writings to illuminate the tensions between scientific authority and embodied experience.

Mike Huggins said the book provides "“a satisfying intellectual and aesthetic experience for the reader." Huggins described the work as a sensitive, well-written, and intellectually rich contribution to the cultural history of mountaineering. He considered the book "a fitting reminder of key figures" in the development of modern mountain heritage. Huggins acknowledged the author’s critical treatment of nationalism, masculinity, and imperialism in historical mountaineering narratives but remarked on the limited attention given to women and Indigenous peoples.

== See also ==
- Golden age of alpinism
- Silver age of alpinism
