= Cima Una =

Mountain in Italy

- German: Einserkofel
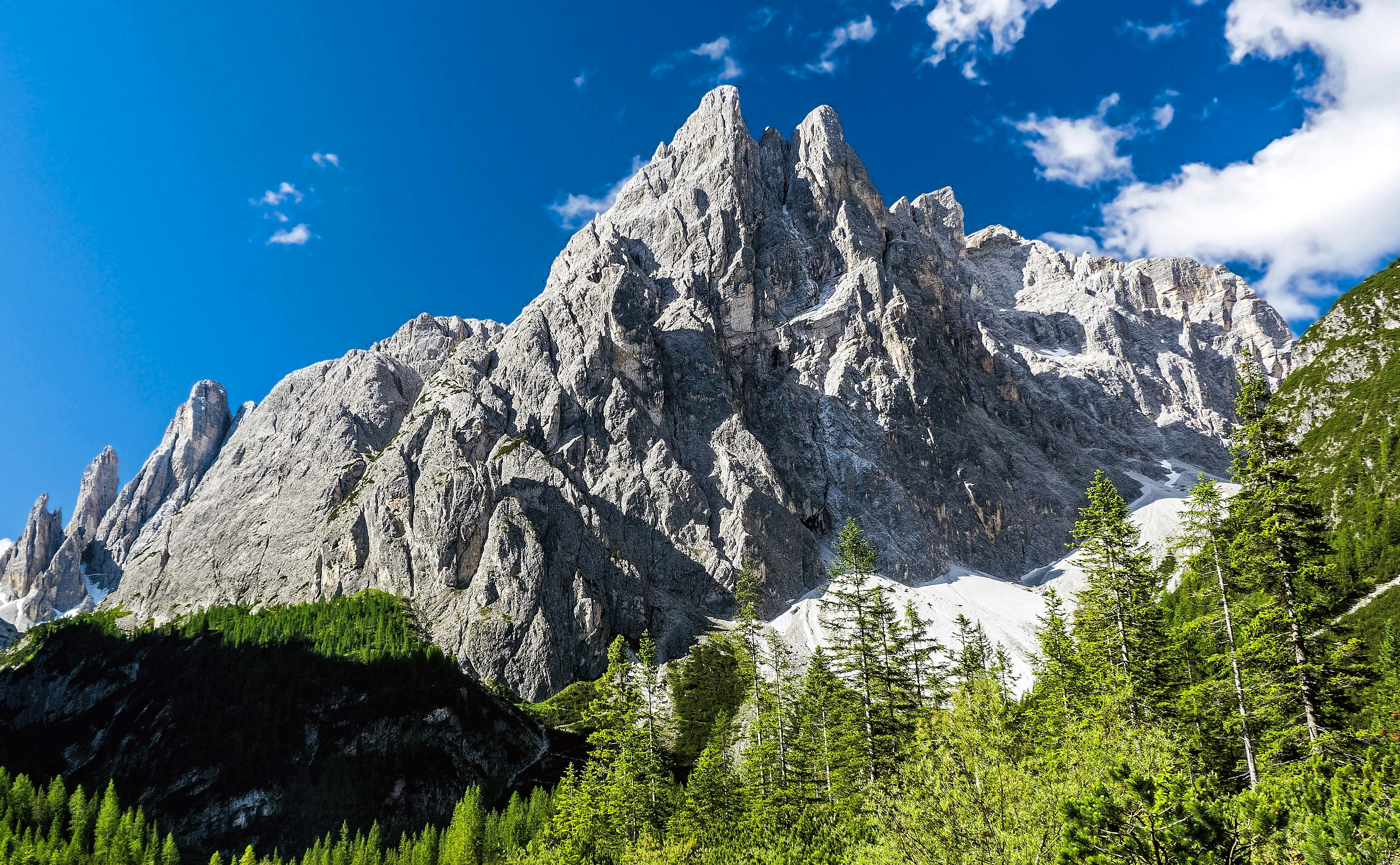
- North aspect

Highest point
- Elevation: 2,698 m (8,852 ft)
- Prominence: 192 m (630 ft)
- Parent peak: Croda dei Toni
- Isolation: 1.93 km (1.20 mi)
- Coordinates: 46°38′22″N 12°20′52″E

Geography
- Location within Italy
- Country: Italy
- Province: South Tyrol
- Protected area: Drei Zinnen / Tre Cime Nature Park
- Parent range: Dolomites; Sexten Dolomites
- Topo map: Tabacco 010 Sesto Dolomites

Geology
- Rock age: Triassic
- Rock type: Dolomite

Climbing
- First ascent: 1879

Cima Una (German: Einserkofel) is a mountain in South Tyrol of Italy.

== Description ==
Cima Una is a 2,698-meter-elevation (8,852-foot) summit in the Sexten Dolomites subrange of the Dolomites, a UNESCO World Heritage Site. Set in the Trentino-Alto Adige/Südtirol region, the peak is located seven kilometers (4.35 miles) south of the village of Sexten, and the peak is set in Drei Zinnen / Tre Cime Nature Park. Precipitation runoff from the mountain drains into tributaries of the Drava. Topographic relief is significant as the summit rises 1,100 meters (3,609 feet) above the Fischleintal Valley in one kilometer (0.6 mile). The nearest higher neighbor is Punta Lavina Lunga, 1.93 kilometers (1.2 miles) to the northwest. The Italian toponym translates as "Peak One" as does the German name. The peak is part of the Sexten Sundial, where each peak represents the hour of the day based on the position of the sun when viewed from Fischleintal Valley, with Cima Una marking the one o'clock position.

== History ==
The first ascent of the summit was accomplished on July 26, 1879, by Loránd Eötvös, Michael Innerkofler, and F. Happacher via the south face.

During the First World War, the peak initially served the Austrians as an observation tower for artillery. On the night of August 26, 1915, it was captured by an Alpini patrol which climbed the south face of the mountain. From then on, it was an essential pillar in the Italian attacking line.

On the morning of October 12, 2007, a 40,000 m^{3} boulder fell from the mountain into the Fischleintal Valley. A dense cloud of dust and debris filled the entire valley. There were no hikers and mountaineers in the area of the rockfall, thus there were no deaths nor injuries. About 100 kilometers away in Innsbruck, this event was registered as an earthquake by seismographs. In order to better identify danger zones in the future, fixed points have been installed in the north face, which are used for monitoring by South Tyrolean Provincial Geology.

== Climate ==
Based on the Köppen climate classification, Cima Una is located in an alpine climate zone with long, cold winters, and short, mild summers. Weather systems are forced upwards by the mountains (orographic lift), causing moisture to drop in the form of rain and snow. The months of June through September offer the most favorable weather for visiting or climbing in this area.

== Gallery ==
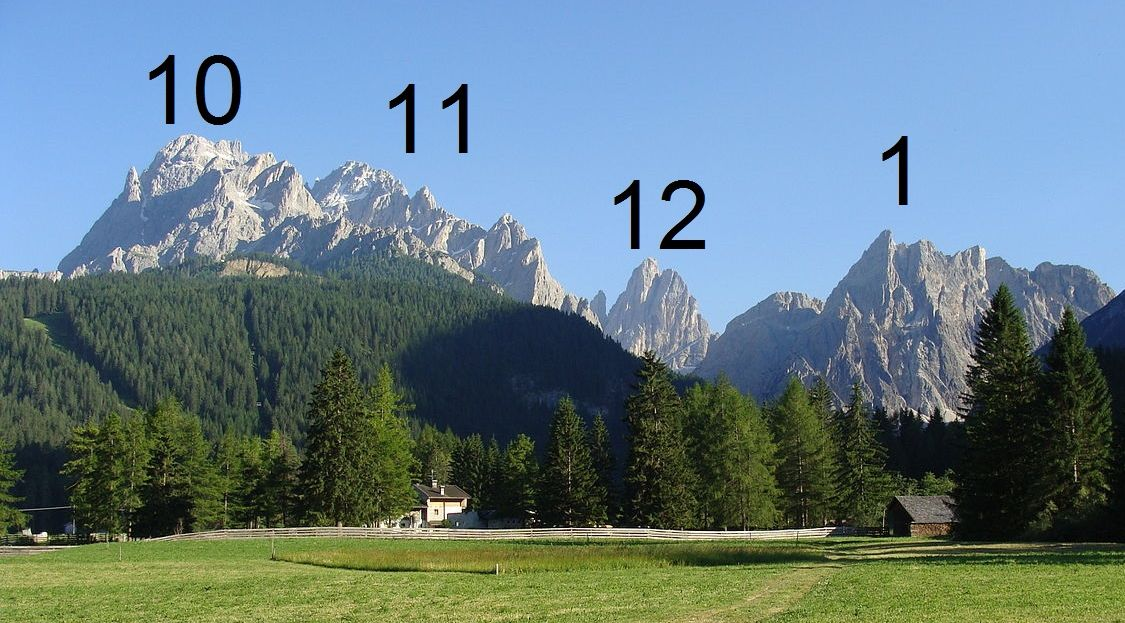
Sexten Sundial

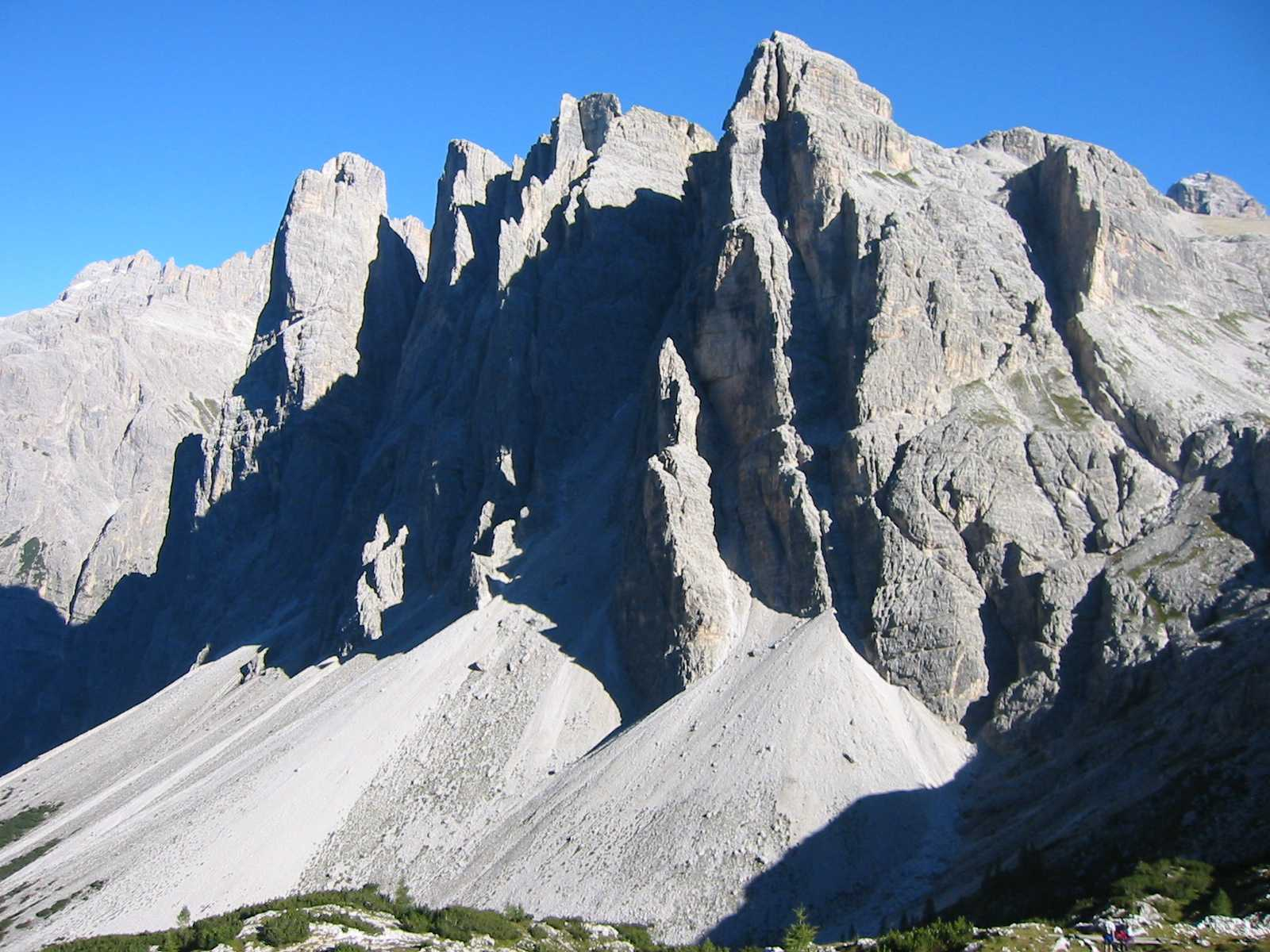
WNW aspect

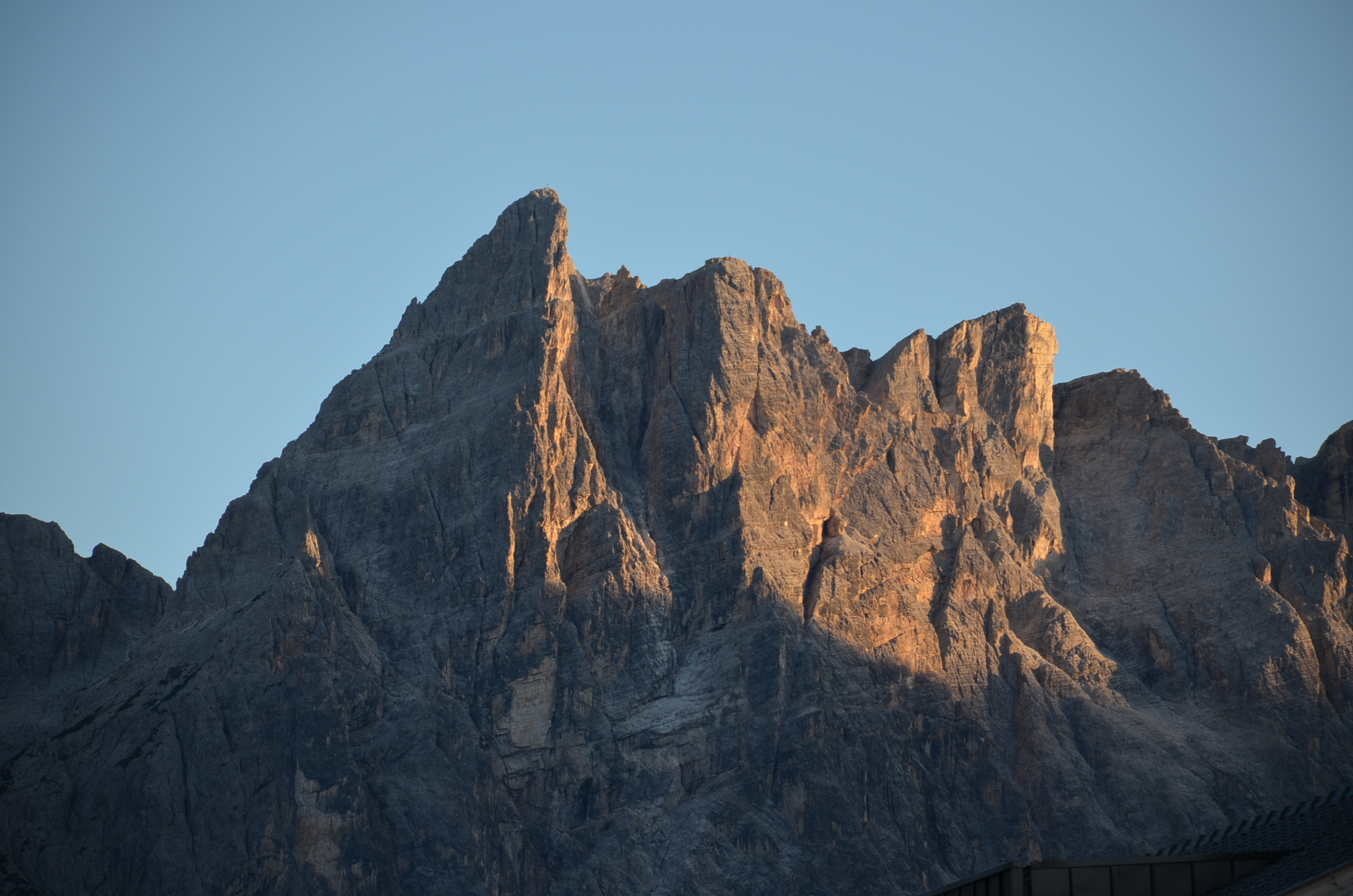

== See also ==
- Southern Limestone Alps
