= Croda dei Rondoi =

Mountain in Italy

- German: Schwalbenkofel
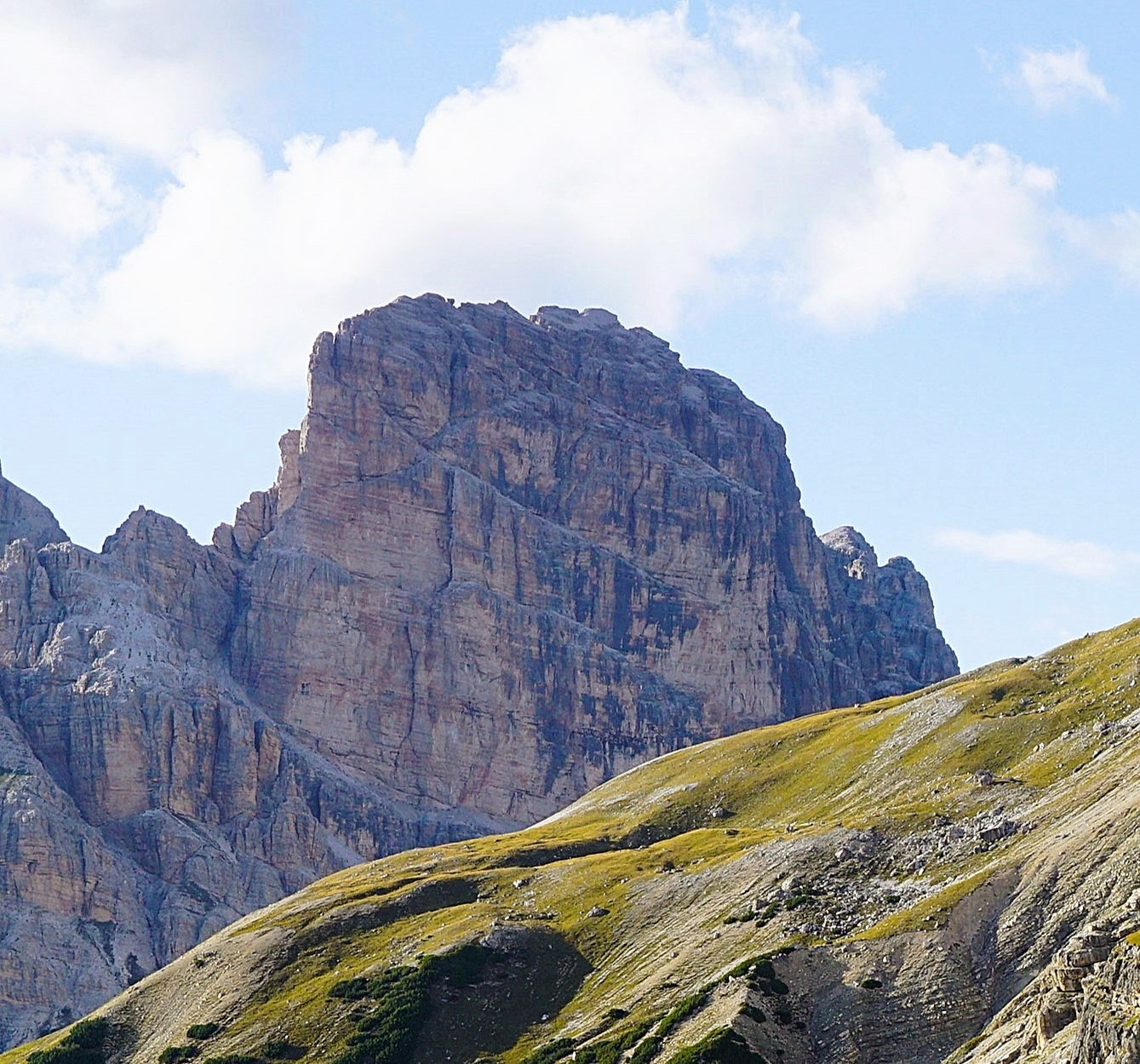
- Southeast aspect

Highest point
- Elevation: 2,873 m (9,426 ft)
- Prominence: 341 m (1,119 ft)
- Parent peak: Birkenkofel
- Isolation: 3.38 km (2.10 mi)
- Coordinates: 46°39′00″N 12°16′19″E

Naming
- Etymology: Swallow

Geography
- Location within Italy
- Country: Italy
- Province: South Tyrol
- Protected area: Drei Zinnen / Tre Cime Nature Park
- Parent range: Dolomites; Sexten Dolomites
- Topo map: Tabacco 010 Sextener Dolomiten/Dolomiti di Sesto

Geology
- Rock age: Triassic
- Rock type: Dolomite

Croda dei Rondoi is a mountain in the province of South Tyrol in northern Italy.

== Description ==
Croda dei Rondoi, also known as Schwalbenkofel in German, is a 2,873-meter-elevation (9,426-foot) summit in the Sexten Dolomites subrange of the Dolomites, a UNESCO World Heritage Site. The toponym translates as "Crag of the Swallows" or "Swallow Peak" in the respective languages. Set in the Trentino-Alto Adige/Südtirol region, the peak is located 10 kilometers (6 miles) south of the municipality of Innichen, and the peak is within Drei Zinnen / Tre Cime Nature Park. Precipitation runoff from the peak drains chiefly into the Rienz, except the northeast slope which drains into tributaries of the Drava. Topographic relief is significant as the summit rises 1,220 meters (4,000 feet) above the Rienz Valley in two kilometers (1.24 miles). The nearest higher neighbor is Hochebenkofel, 3.38 kilometers (2.1 miles) to the north-northwest.

== Climate ==
Based on the Köppen climate classification, Croda dei Rondoi is located in an alpine climate zone with long, cold winters, and short, mild summers. Weather systems are forced upwards by the mountains (orographic lift), causing moisture to drop in the form of rain and snow. The months of June through September offer the most favorable weather for visiting or climbing in this area.

== Gallery ==
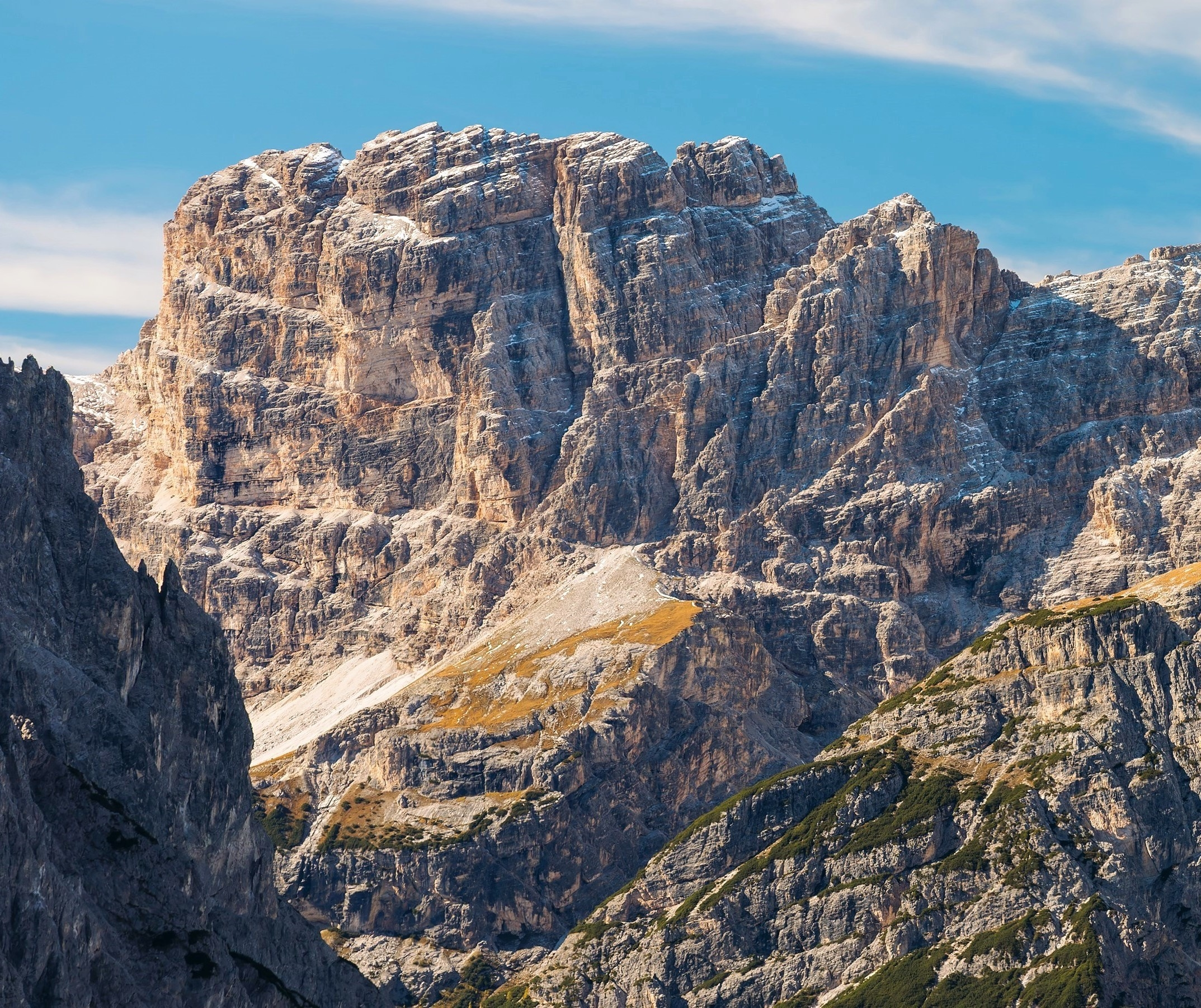
Northeast aspect

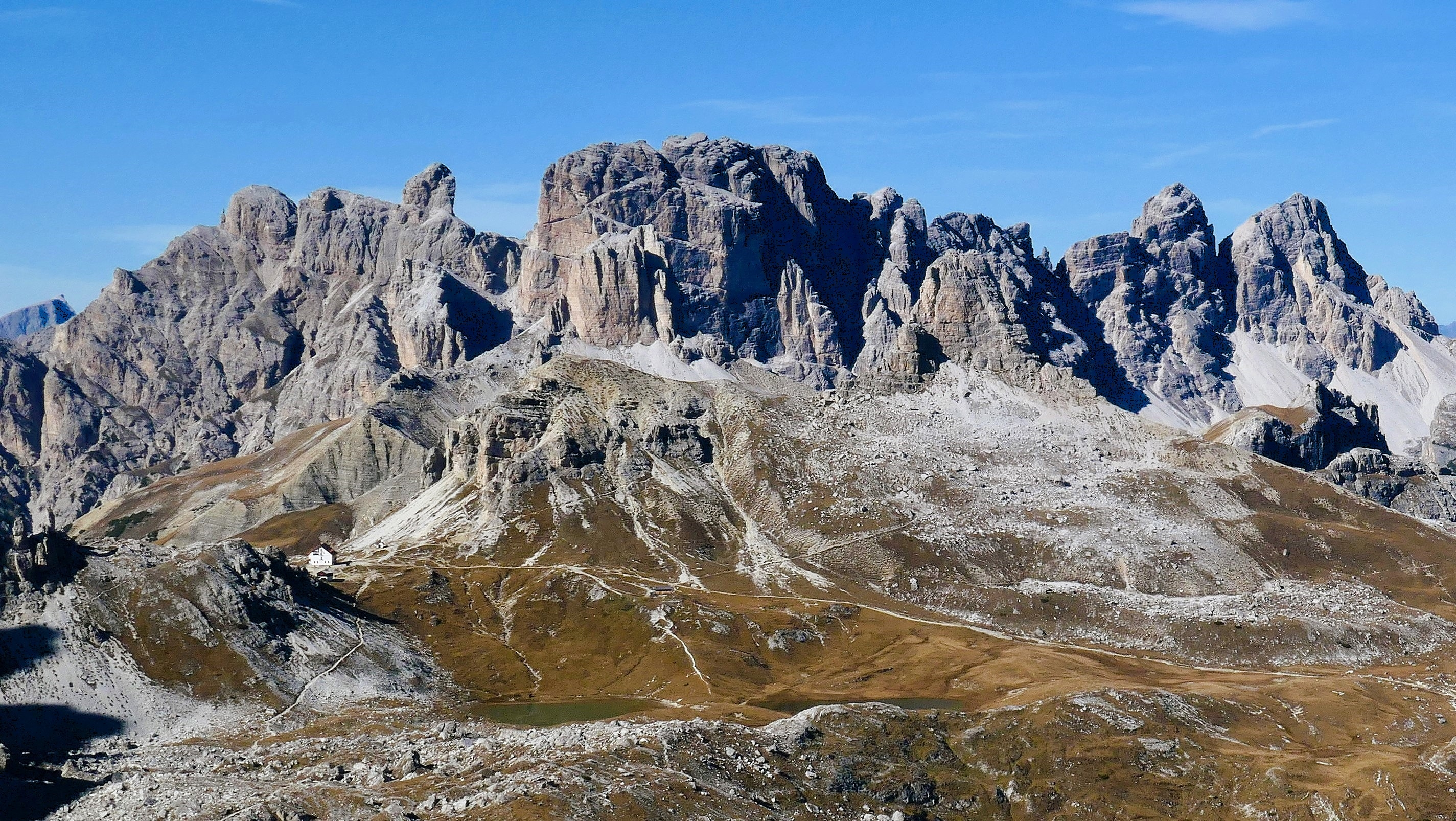

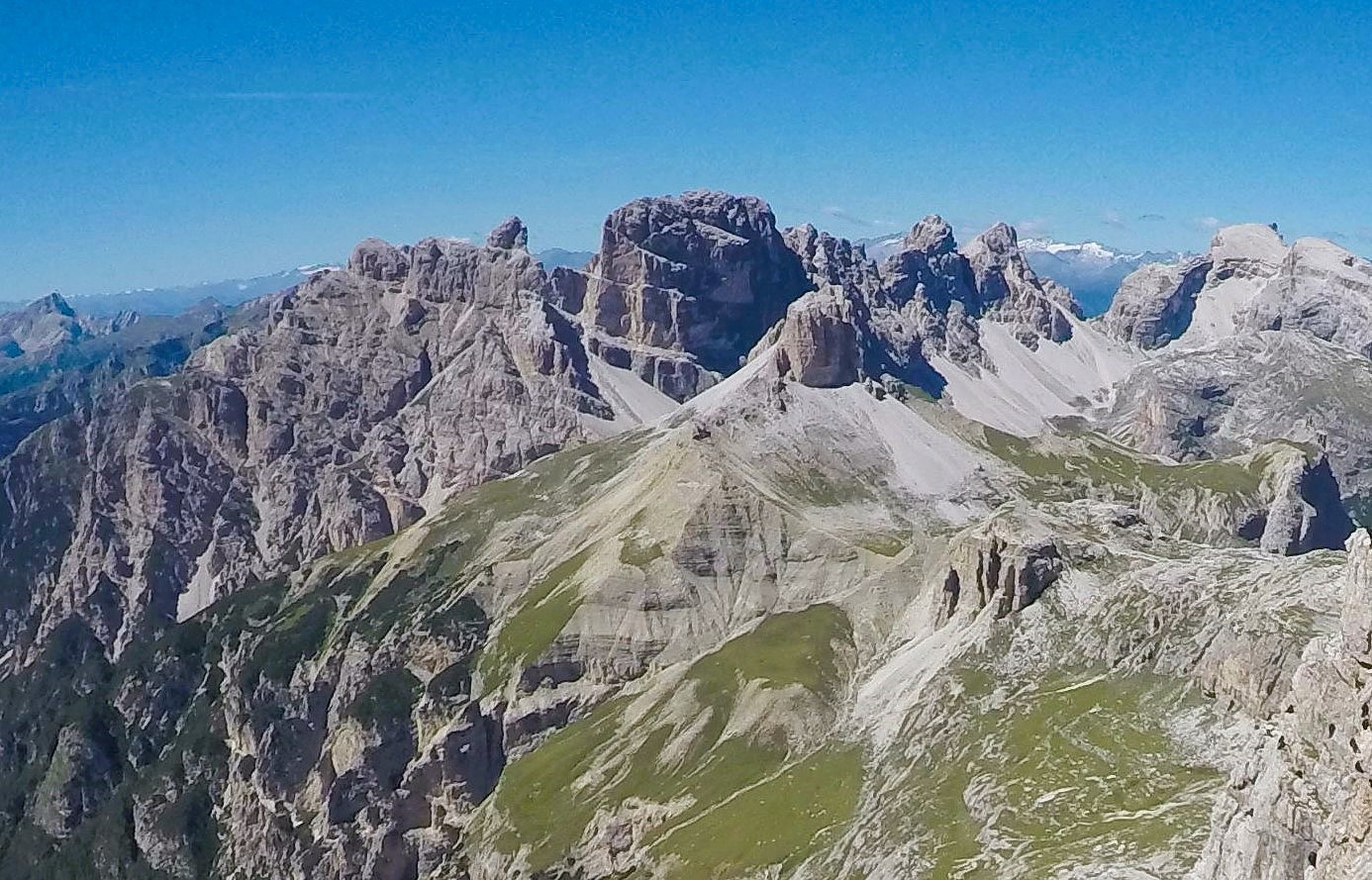
Southeast aspect of Croda dei Rondoi viewed from Monte Paterno

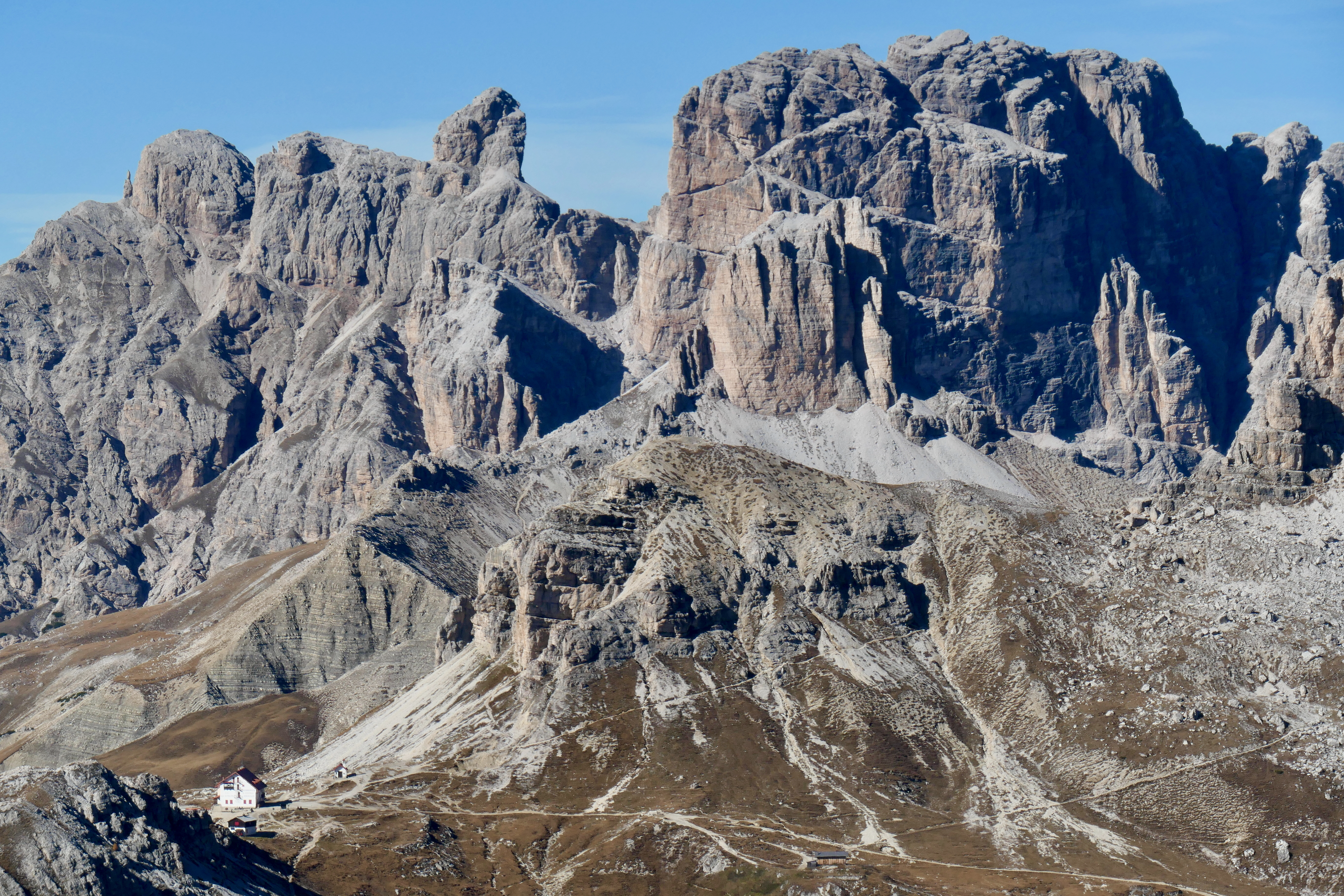

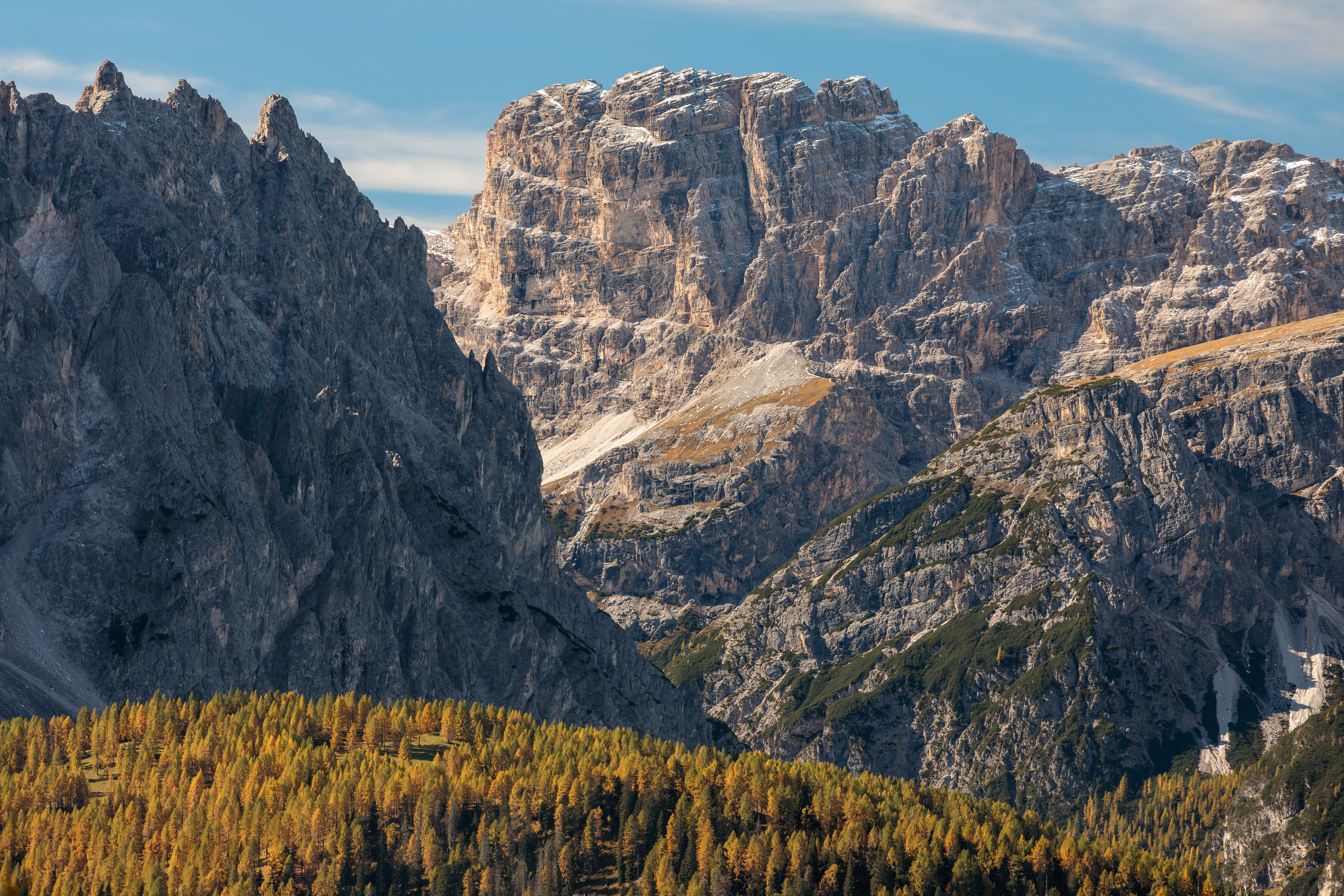

== See also ==
- Southern Limestone Alps
