= Sextener Rotwand =

Mountain in Italy

Coordinates: 46°38′27″N 12°22′31″E

- (Zehner)
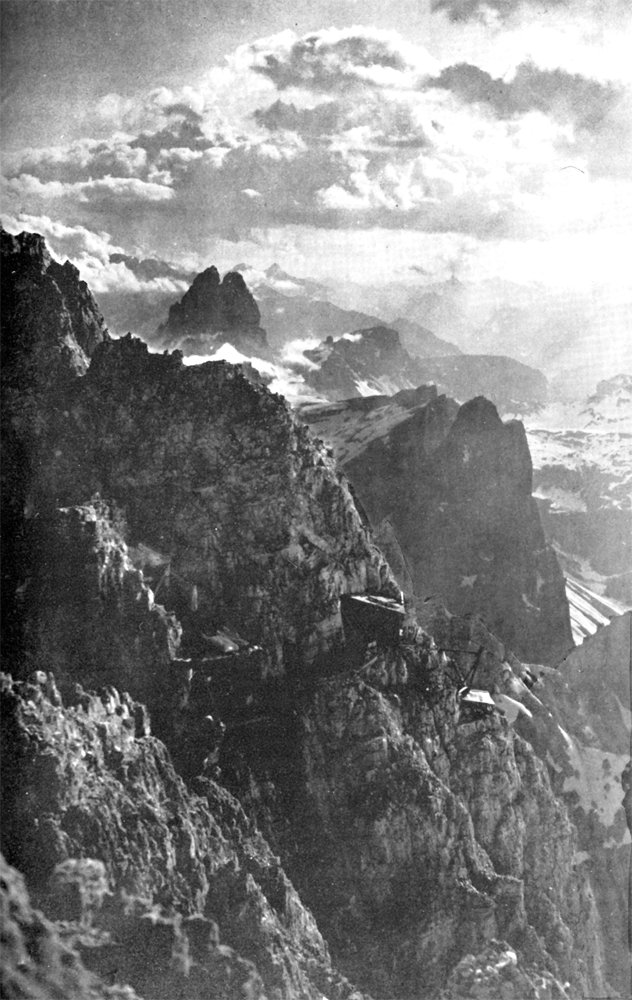
- Austrian military position in the Rotwand, Sexten Dolomites, in World War I

Highest point
- Elevation: 2,965 m (9,728 ft)

Geography
- Location: South Tyrol, Italy
- Parent range: Sexten Dolomites

Climbing
- First ascent: 20 July 1878 by Michel Innerkofler and Roland von Eötvös

The Sextener Rotwand (Italian: Croda Rossa di Sesto; German: Sextener Rotwand) or Zehner is a mountain in the Sexten Dolomites in South Tyrol, Italy. During the so-called "White War" in World War I, the mountain was heavily contested by the armies of Italy and Austria-Hungary.
