= Dreischusterspitze =

Mountain in Italy

- Punta dei Tre Scarperi
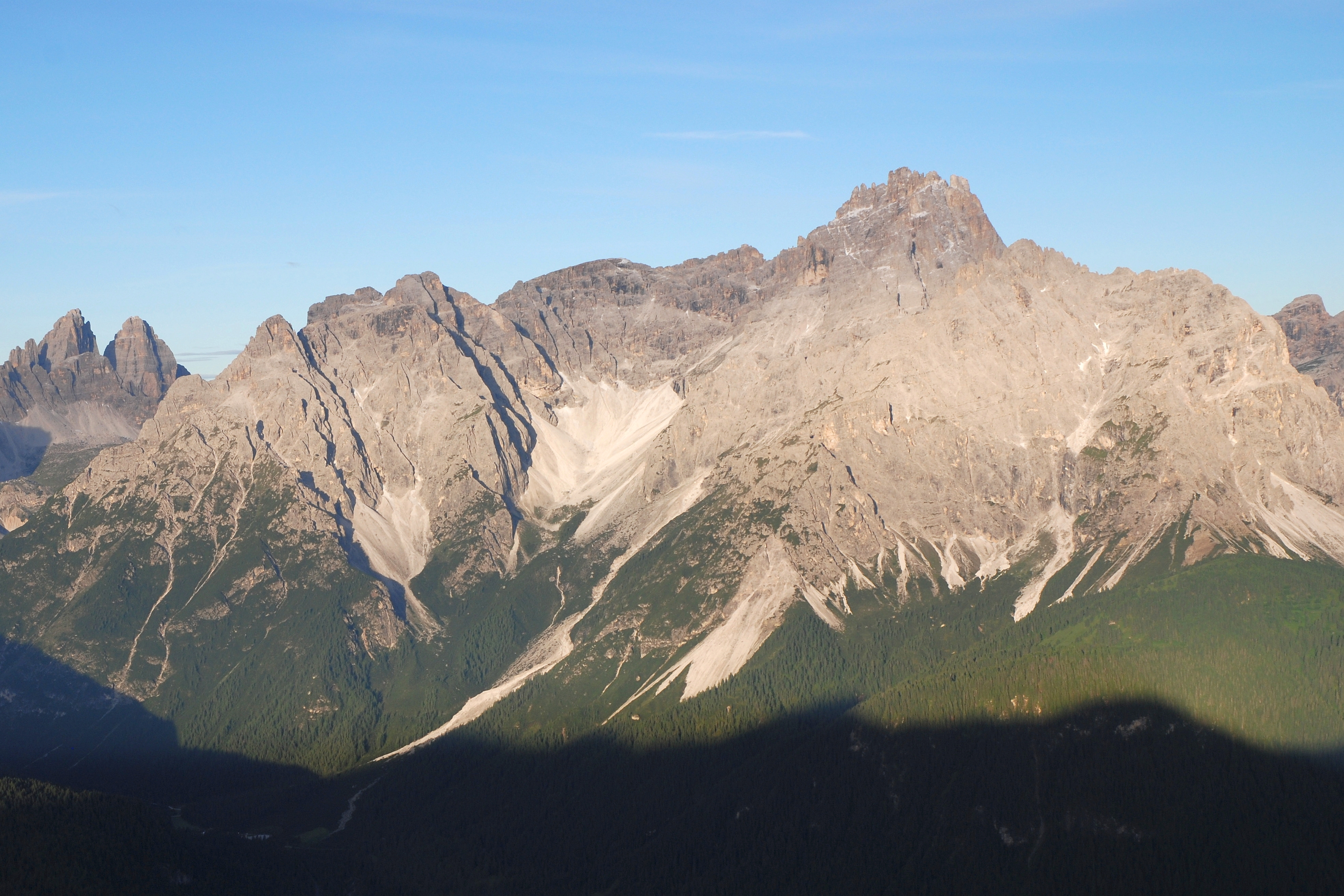
- Dreischusterspitze as seen from Sillianer Hütte

Highest point
- Elevation: 3,145 m (10,318 ft)
- Prominence: 1,393 m (4,570 ft)
- Listing: Alpine mountains above 3000 m
- Coordinates: 46°40′7″N 12°19′5″E

Geography
- Location within Alps
- Location: South Tyrol, Italy
- Parent range: Dolomites

Climbing
- First ascent: 18 July 1869 by Paul Grohmann, Franz Innerkofler and Peter Salcher

The Dreischusterspitze (Italian: Punta dei Tre Scarperi) is a mountain of the Dolomites in South Tyrol, Italy. It is the highest peak of the Sexten Dolomites and the most northerly 3,000m peak of the range. From the north it resembles a majestic pyramid, while from the east and west it resembles a jagged ridge. The mountain is located above the village of Sexten. It was first climbed in 1869 by Paul Grohmann, Franz Innerkofler and Peter Salcher.

Huts in the area are the Dreischusterhütte (Rifugio Tre Scarperi, 1653 m) in the Innerfeldtal as well as the Talschlusshütte (Rifugio al Fondo Valle, 1548 m) in the Fischlein Valley and the Dreizinnenhütte (Rifugio Locatelli, 2405 m) in the south of the Schusterplatte.

== Climate ==
Based on the Köppen climate classification, Dreischusterspitze is located in an alpine climate zone with long, cold winters, and short, mild summers. Weather systems are forced upwards by the mountains (orographic lift), causing moisture to drop in the form of rain and snow. The months of June through September offer the most favorable weather for visiting or climbing in this area.

== Gallery ==
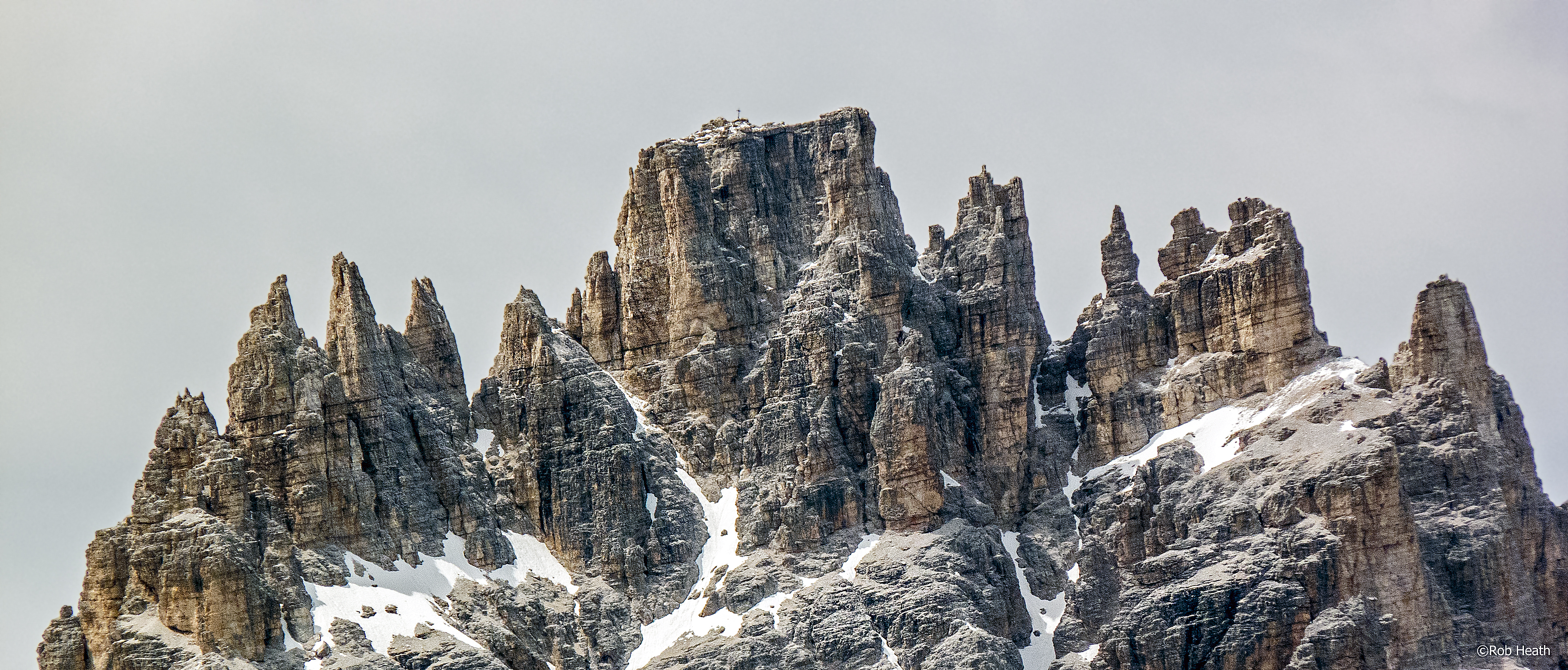
Towers and pinnacles of the Dreischusterspitze, summit cross just visible

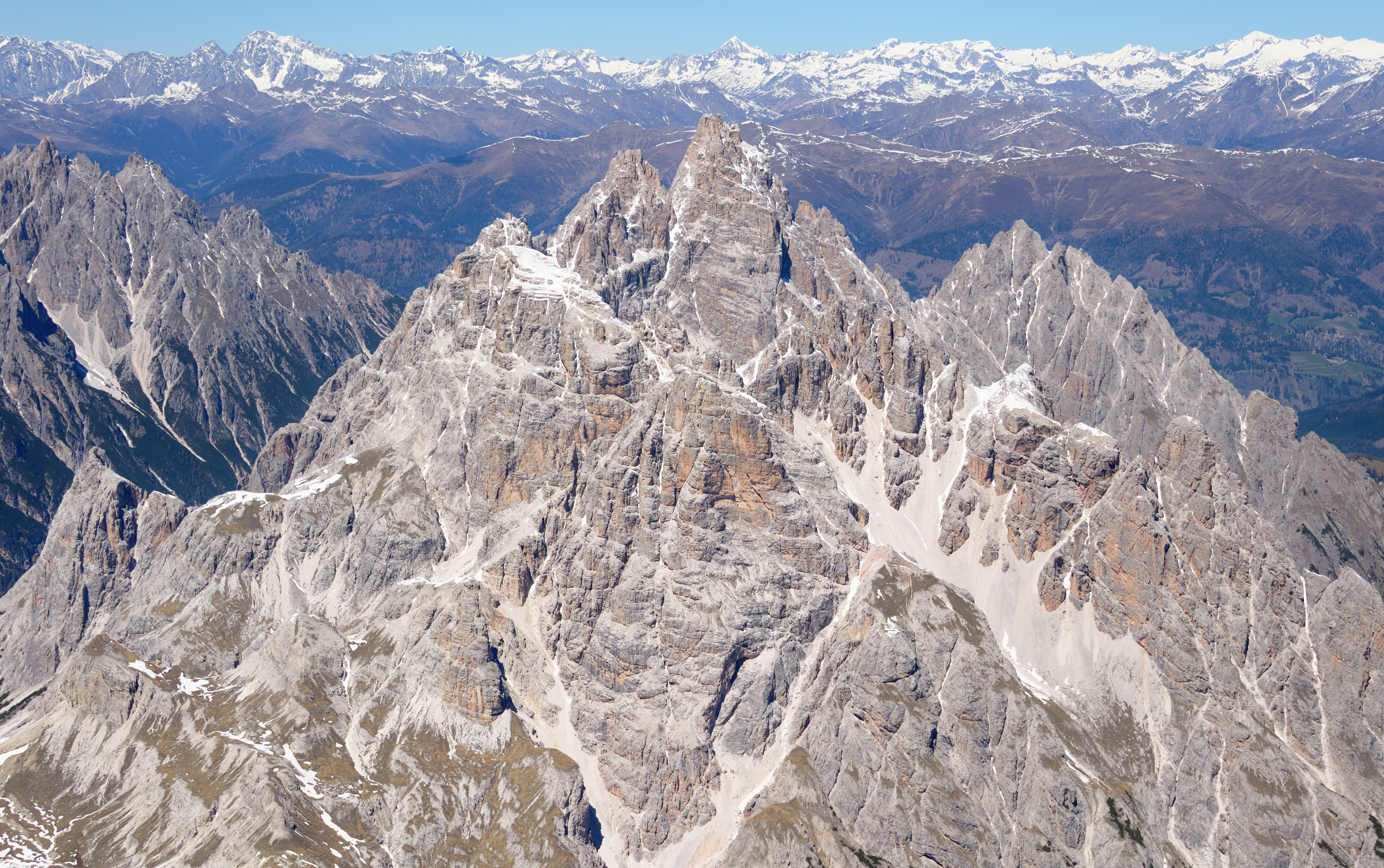
Aerial view from the south

== See also ==
- Southern Limestone Alps
