= Trafoier Eiswand =

Mountain in Italy

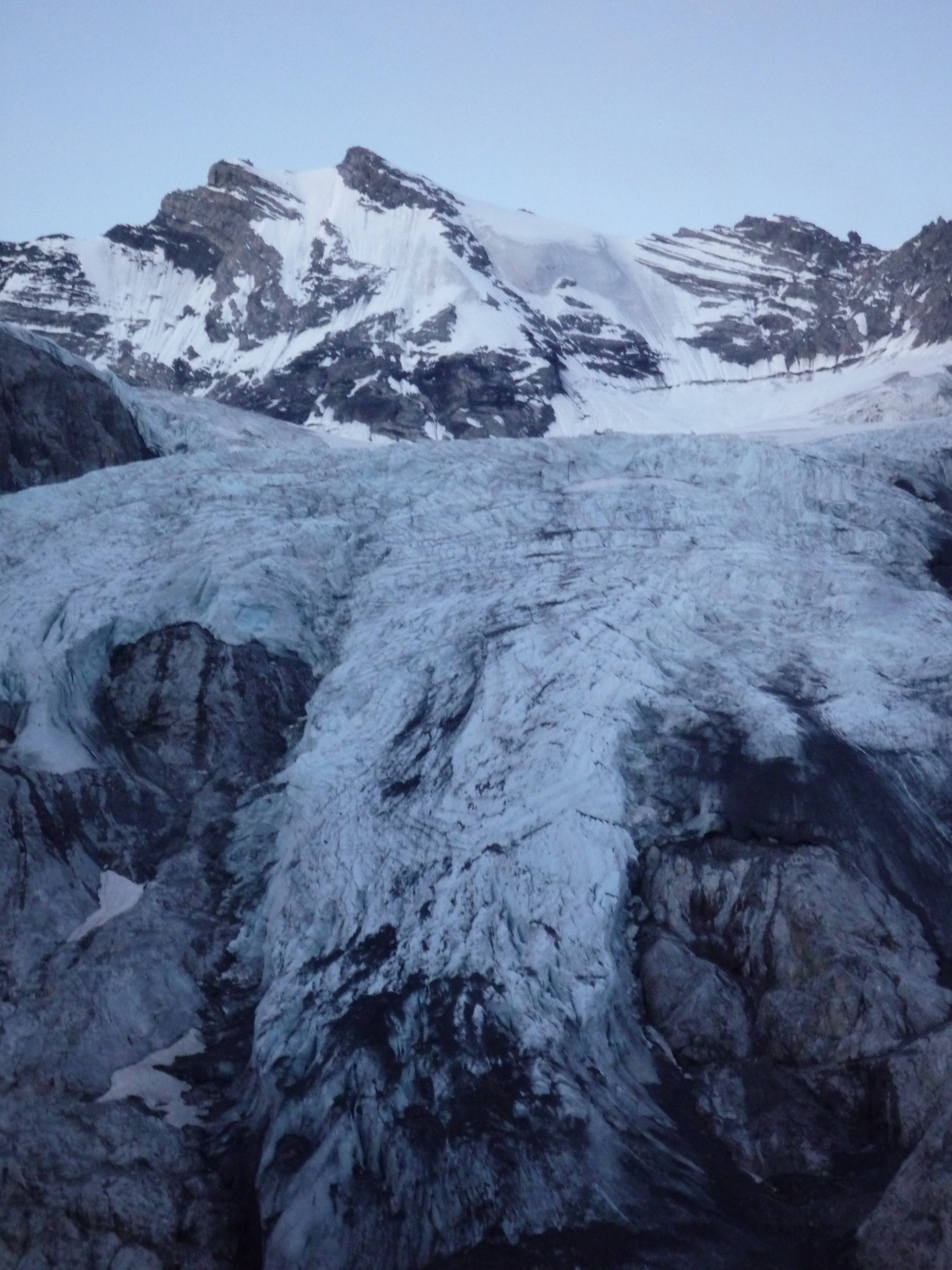
- Trafoier Eiswand.

Highest point
- Elevation: 3,565 m (11,696 ft)
- Coordinates: 46°29′46″N 10°30′45″E

Geography
- Location within Alps
- Location: South Tyrol / Province of Sondrio (both Italy)
- Parent range: Ortler Alps

Climbing
- First ascent: 8 July 1872 by Moritz von Déchy, Alois and Johann Pinggera

The Trafoier Eiswand is a mountain in the Ortler Alps on the border between South Tyrol and the Province of Sondrio, Italy.
