= Birkenkofel =

Mountain in Italy

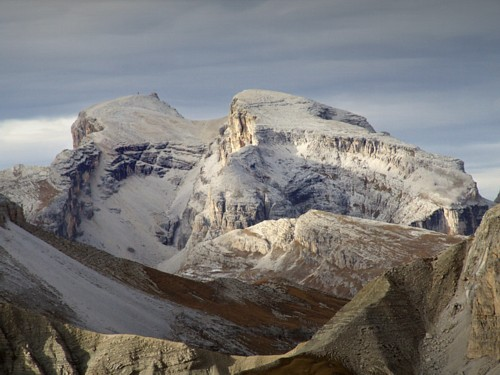

Highest point
- Elevation: 2,922 m (9,587 ft)
- Coordinates: 46°40′53″N 12°15′19″E

Geography
- Location within Italy
- Location: South Tyrol, Italy
- Parent range: Sexten Dolomites

Climbing
- First ascent: 17 July 1880 by Ludwig Grünwald and Santo Siorpaes

The Birkenkofel (Italian: Croda dei Baranci; German: Birkenkofel) is a mountain in the Sexten Dolomites in South Tyrol, Italy.
