= Elferkofel =

Mountain in Italy

- Cima Undici
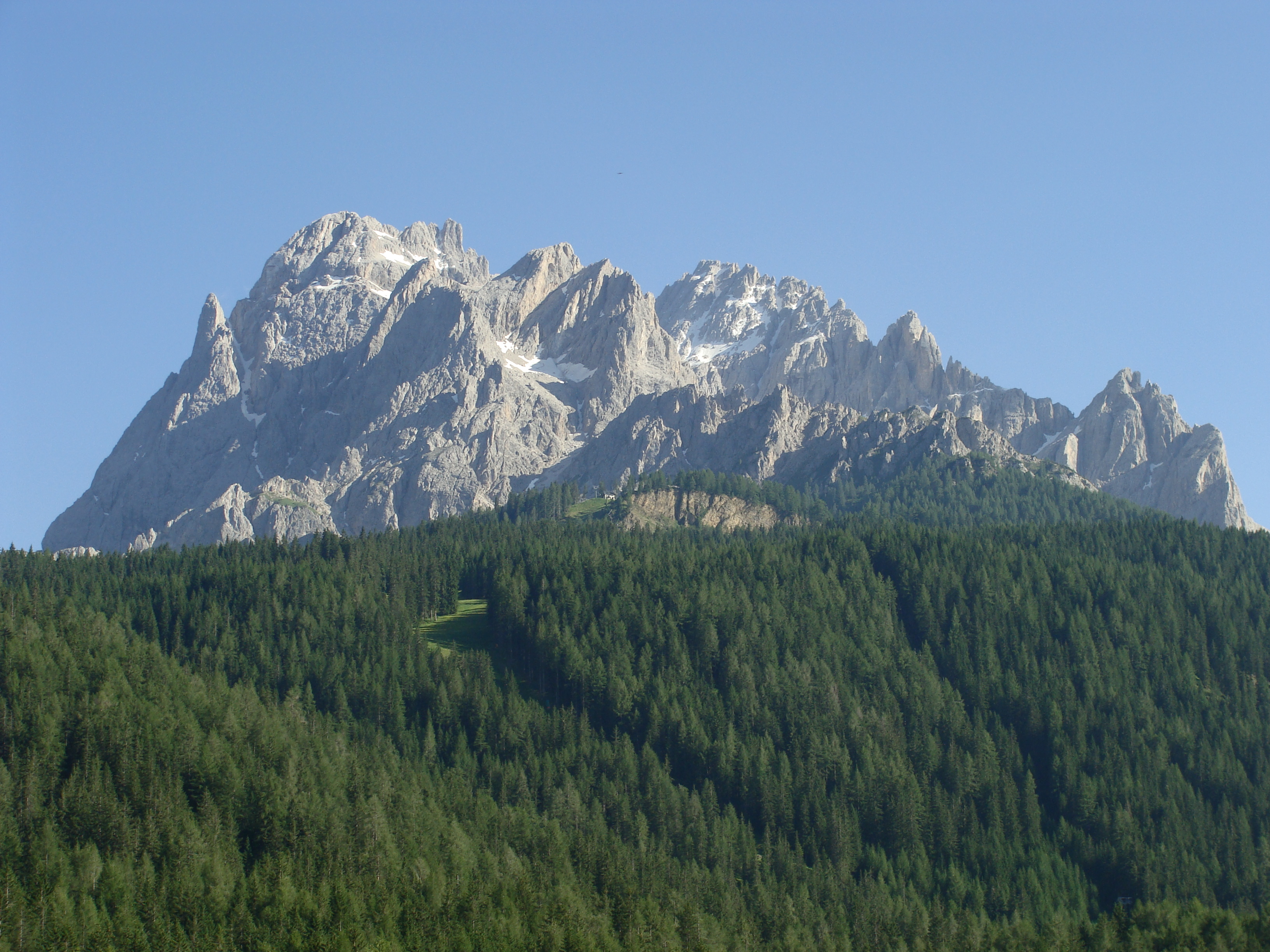

Highest point
- Elevation: 3,092 m (10,144 ft)
- Prominence: 661 m (2,169 ft)
- Listing: Alpine mountains above 3000 m
- Coordinates: 46°38′10″N 12°22′41″E

Geography
- Location within Alps
- Location: South Tyrol / Province of Belluno, Italy
- Parent range: Sexten Dolomites

Climbing
- First ascent: 1878 by Michel Innerkofler

The Cima Undici - Elferkofel (Italian: Cima Undici; German: Elferkofel) is a mountain in the Sexten Dolomites in South Tyrol, Italy.
