= Sexten Dolomites =

Mountain range in South Tyrol, Italy

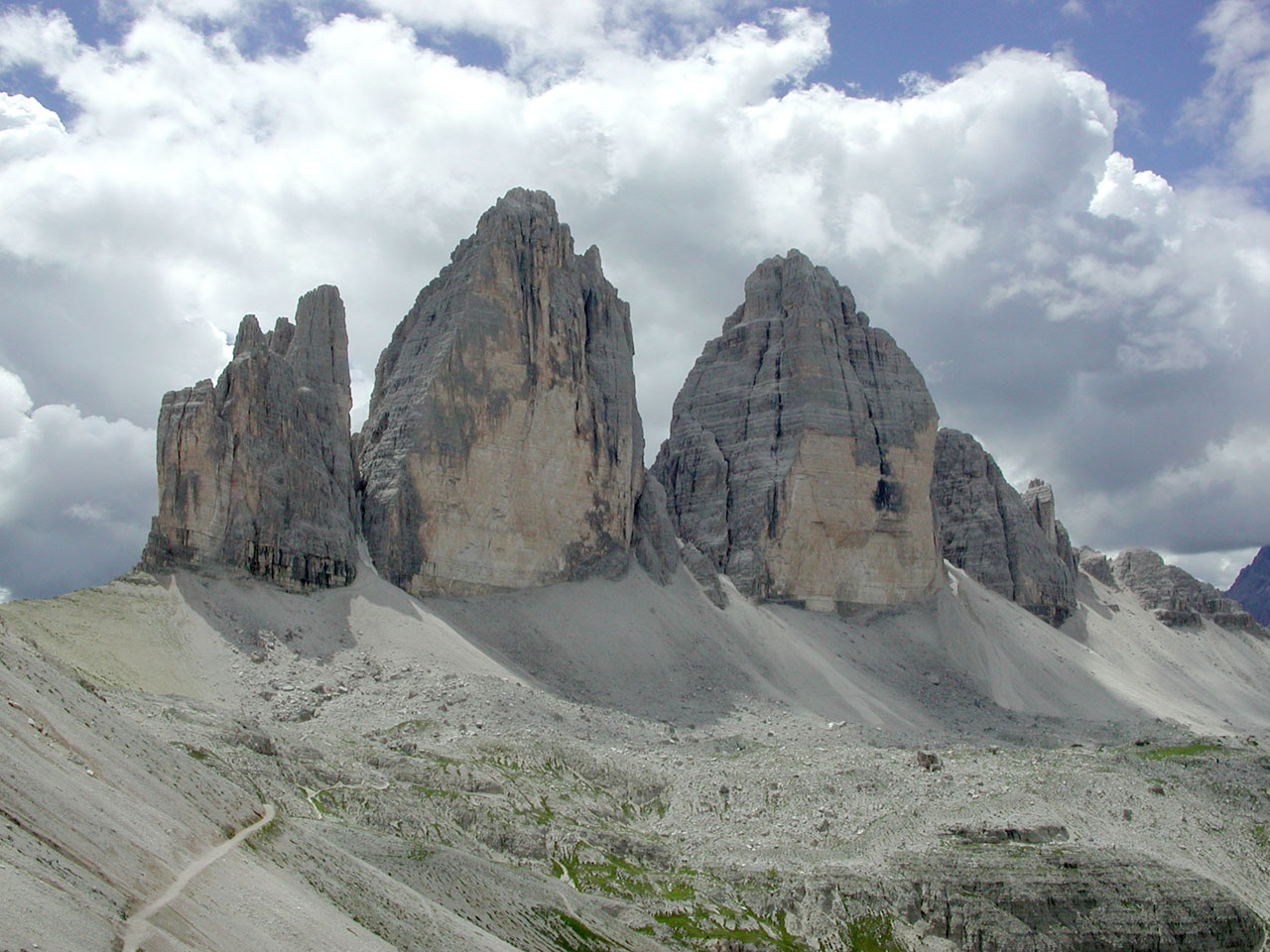

- Location within Alps
- Location: Belluno and South Tyrol, Italy
- Coordinates: 46°39′N 12°19′E
- Area: 116 km^{2} (45 sq mi)
- Established: 1981
- Website: www.provinz.bz.it/natur/2803/index_e.asp

The Sexten Dolomites (Italian: Dolomiti di Sesto; German: Sextener Dolomiten) is a mountain range and a nature reserve in South Tyrol, Italy. The nature park was renamed in 2010 to Naturpark Drei Zinnen – Parco Naturale Tre Cime.

== Peaks ==
| Peak | Elevation | |
| Peak | m | ft |
|---|---|---|
| Punta dei Tre Scarperi (Dreischusterspitze) | 3,152 | 10,341 |
| Croda dei Toni (Zwölferkofel) | 3,094 | 10,151 |
| Cima Undici (Elferkofel) | 3,092 | 10,144 |
| Tre Cime di Lavaredo (Drei Zinnen) | 2,999 | 9,839 |
| Croda Rossa di Sesto (Sextener Rotwand) | 2,965 | 9,728 |
| Croda dei Baranci (Birkenkofel) | 2,922 | 9,587 |
| Croda dei Rondoi (Schwalbenkofel) | 2,873 | 9,426 |
| Monte Paterno (Paternkofel) | 2,744 | 9,003 |
| Croda Passaporto (Passportenkofel) | 2,719 | 8,921 |
| Cima Una (Einserkofel) | 2,698 | 8,852 |
| Torre di Toblin (Toblinger Knoten) | 2,617 | 8,586 |
| Monte Piana | 2,324 | 7,625 |
