= Michael Innerkofler =

Austrian mountaineer and mountain guide

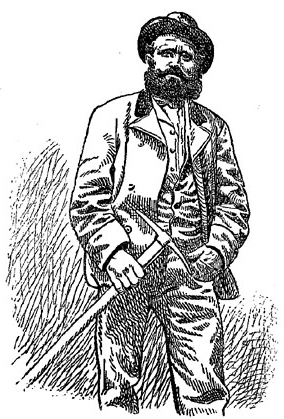
- Portrait of Michael Innerkofler by Albert Heim, from a book published in 1917
- Born: 30 July 1844; Sexten
- Died: 20 August 1888 (aged 44); Cristallo
- Cause of death: Crevasse accident
- Occupations: Farmer, mountain climber and mountain guide
- Known for: Pioneer climbings of the Dolomites

Michael Innerkofler (30 July 1844 – 20 August 1888) was a South Tyrol farmer, mountain climbing pioneer and mountain guide. He was born in Sexten. Innerkofler was a climbing pioneer of the Dolomites, and known for several first ascents. His first ascents include Zwölferkofel, Cima Una, Cima Ovest (in 1879) and Cima Piccola (in 1881) of the Tre Cime di Lavaredo, and various peaks/routes of Monte Cristallo.

Innerkofler perished in a crevasse accident on the mountain of Cristallo on 20 August 1888.
