= Zwölferkofel =

Mountain in Italy

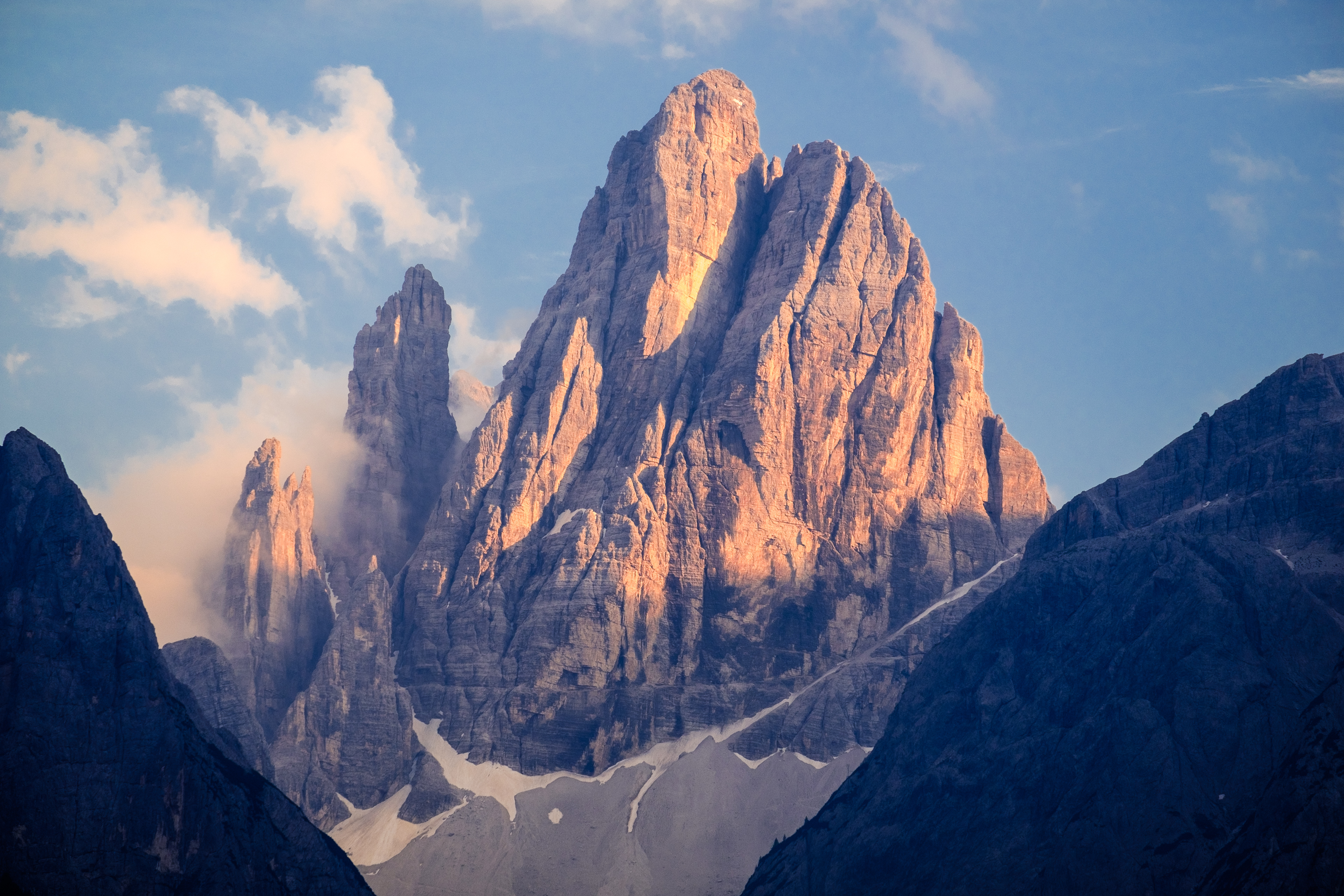

Highest point
- Elevation: 3,094 m (10,151 ft)
- Listing: Alpine mountains above 3000 m
- Coordinates: 46°37′7″N 12°21′42″E

Geography
- Location within Italy
- Location: South Tyrol / Province of Belluno, Italy
- Parent range: Sexten Dolomites

Climbing
- First ascent: 28 September 1874 by Johann Innerkofler and Michel Innerkofler

The Zwölferkofel (Italian: Croda dei Toni; German: Zwölferkofel) or Zwölfer (German for "Twelve" or "Twelfth") is a peak of the Sexten Dolomites on the border between the provinces of South Tyrol and Belluno, in Italy.
