= Battle of Monte Piana =

1915 Italo-Austro Hungarian battle

Coordinates: 46°37′01.69″N 12°14′39.79″E

- Part of the Italian Front of White War
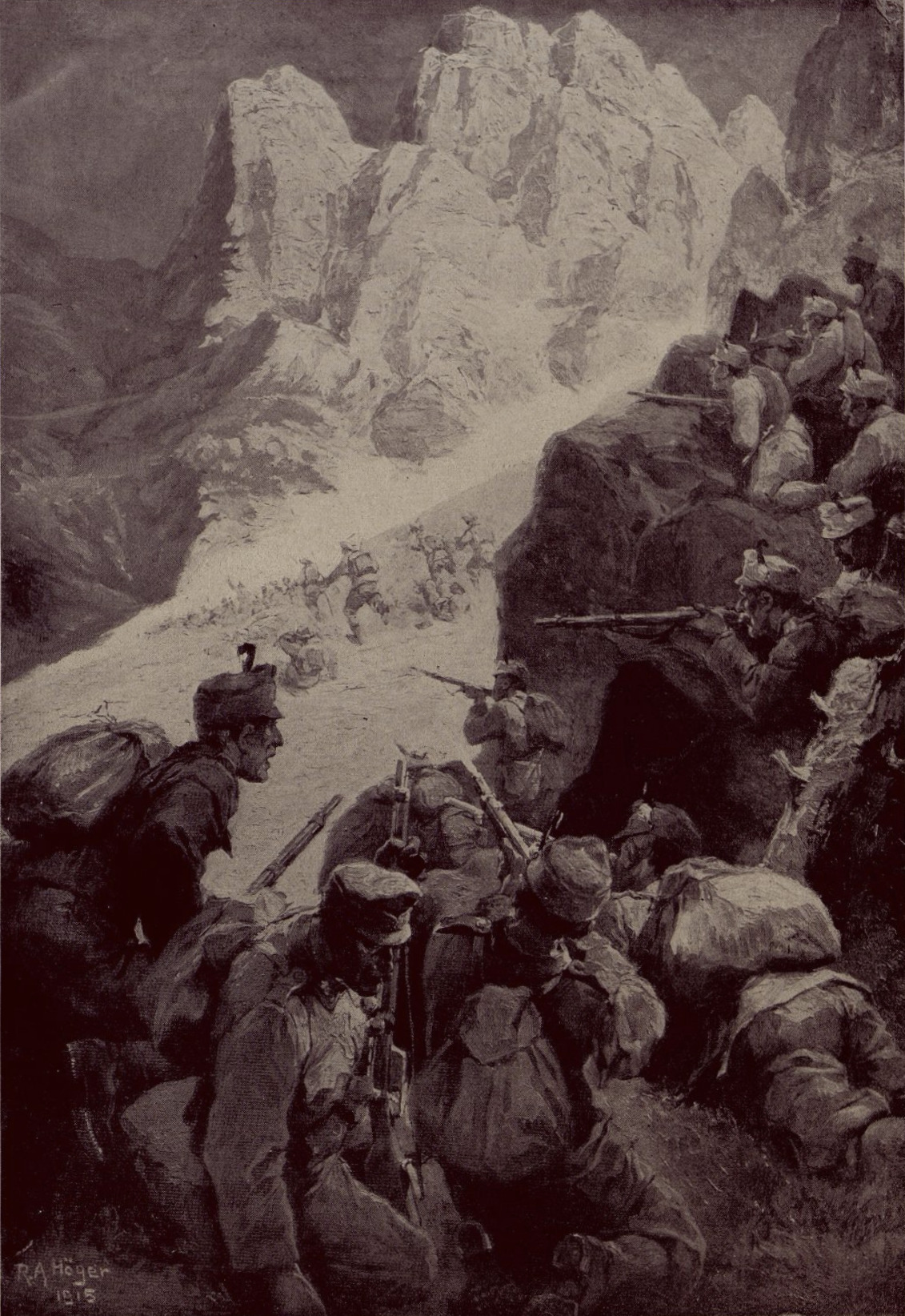
- Austrian illustration of Austro-Hungarian attack in summer 1915 (R. A. Höger)
Date	24 May 1915 – 22 October 1917
Location	Monte Piana, Italy
Result	Austro-Hungarian victory

Belligerents
Italy	Austria-Hungary

Commanders and leaders
(Kingdom of Italy) Luigi Nava (Kingdom of Italy) Ottavio Ragni (Kingdom of Italy) Mario Nicolis di Robilant	(Austria-Hungary) Ludwig Goiginger

Casualties and losses
- 14,000 killed

The Battle of Monte Piana was a long and bloody series of clashes that took place on the summit of Monte Piana which is part of the Sexten Dolomites massif. Between 1915 and 1917 some of the most violent clashes took place between Italian and Austro-Hungarian soldiers who fought for two years on the flat top of this mountain. It was one of the bloodiest and most static theaters of the entire war, and despite the clear superiority of men and armaments of the Royal Army, the Italian commands were never able to conquer the dominant positions on the mountain occupied by the Austrians, both for tactical errors and for incompetence of a new and unusual battle in the high mountains.

== Background ==
Although Italy was a member of the Triple Alliance with Austria-Hungary and Germany, Italy did not enter the war in August 1914 claiming that none of its allies had been directly attacked. Italy also had a strong rivalry with Austria-Hungary that dated back to the Congress of Vienna of 1815, after the Napoleonic Wars, when cities with an Italian majority were ceded to Austria.

The borders established after the Third Italian War of Independence had in almost all cases favored the Austrians, the predominantly mountainous border, which in its western part corresponded almost everywhere with the current administrative limit of the region Trentino-Alto Adige benefited the Austrians who found themselves in a situation of geographical advantage everywhere, as they were in an elevated position compared to the Italians. However, the situation was different on Monte Piana, where the ancient border between Tyrol and the Republic of Venice remained, sanctioned by memorial stones on the summit plateau of the mountain; this was almost entirely Italian territory that penetrated Austrian territory forming a wedge pointed towards Dobbiaco. The Austrians, for their part, protected themselves from this threat by transforming Rautkofel into a very strong artillery position completed by the batteries positioned on Col di Specie (above Pratopiazza) and on Torre dei Scarperi, capable of keeping the Monte Piana plateau entirely under fire. At the outbreak of the conflict between Italy and Austria-Hungary, Mount Piana found itself in the middle of a fundamental crossroads, which if conquered would have led the Italian troops to enter Dobbiaco, and therefore be able to head towards Brunico or even Lienz.

The tranquility of this mountain was already shattered in the first days of the war, when Monte Piana revealed itself for what it was in the strategic vision of the conflict, a gigantic mountain flattened at the top, of what at the beginning of the 20th century was one of the crucial nodes of the eastern Dolomite front, which if broken through would have led directly to Val Pusteria and the railway, a vital hub of Austrian communications.

== The Battle on Monte Piana ==
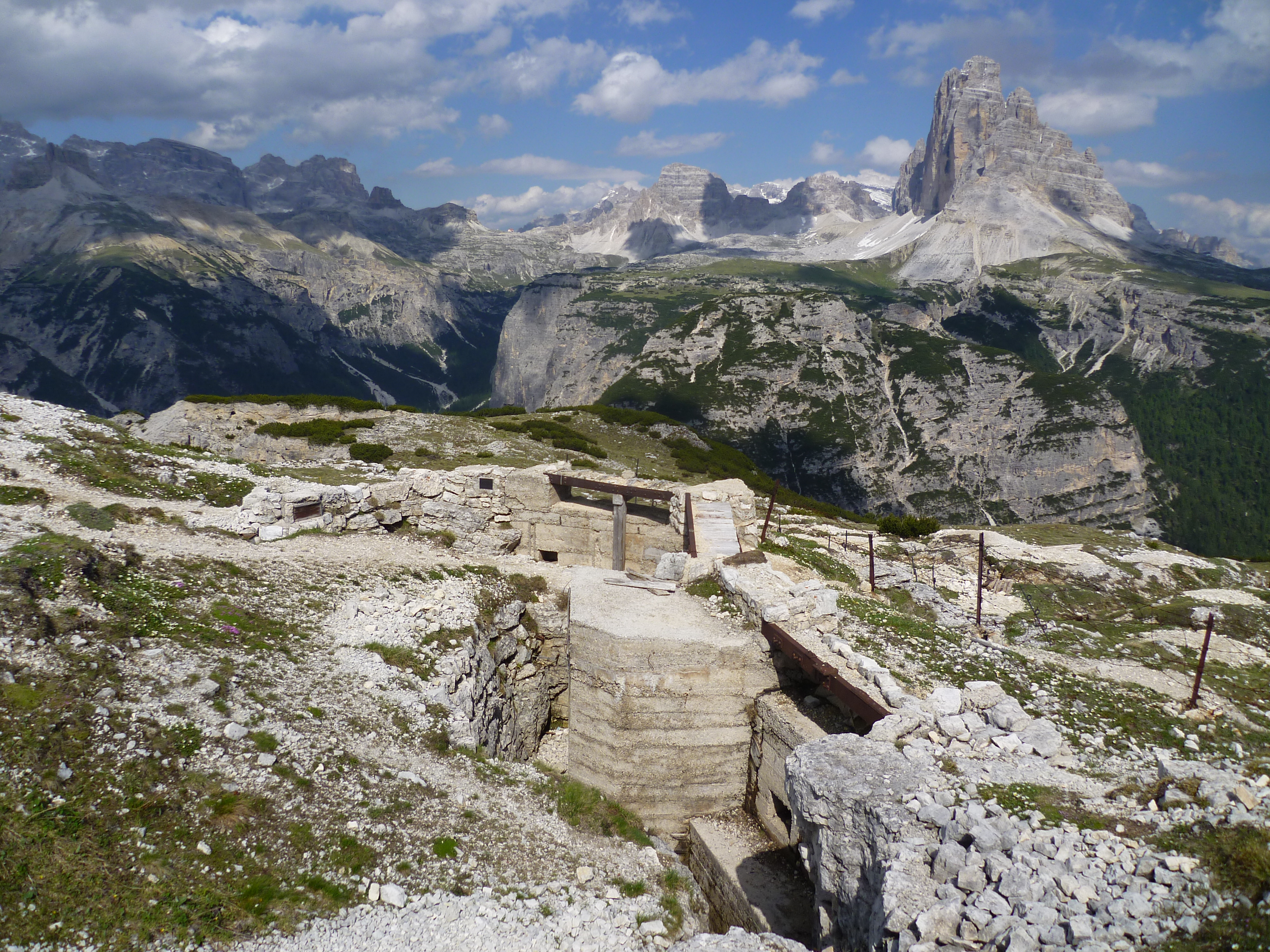
Monte Piana trenches

On 23 May at 7.00 pm the Imperial-Royal post office of Dürrensee was informed by telephone that Italy had declared war on Austria-Hungary. During the night the Austrian sentries abandoned their posts along the northern summit of Mount Piana to move downstream to the defensive lines, and at the same time destroyed all the road systems. The Italians did the same on the morning of 24 May, when the Alpine troops set fire to the Piano-Hütte, built trenches along the southern edge and sent a platoon near the Carducci pyramid, which constituted the most advanced Italian post

The first Italian deaths on the Cadore front were 2 Alpini of the 67th company, who around 8.30 am on 24 May were hit by a grenade fired from the Austrian battery of Birkenkofel. All the Alpine troops, free from duty, rushed to the large hotels in the area, looking for spies; However, in the cabin of the Grand Hotel they only found a thousand bottles of the best European wines, of which they massacred (in truth the wine was paid for with a month's pay by the Alpine officers, plus the officers' contribution).

On 27 May the Austrians transported a howitzer to the Passo Grande dei Rondoi which immediately began to attack the Piana. In those days the Monte Piana line that went from the Carducci pyramid to the precipice on the Vallon dei Castrati was manned by the Alpine troops who carried out continuous patrols in Piz Popena and Höhlensteintal while on 1 June two groups of sappers they set fire to the Rienza barracks and with the jelly they interrupted the path that from the town garrisoned by the Austrians to the west of Monte Piana, Carbonin, led to Forcella dei Castrati

On the Austrian side, the newly arrived field marshal Ludwig Goiginger, commander of the Pustertal division, requested the sending of reinforcements for an action on Mount Piana, of which he had already recognized the fundamental importance strategic. The Italians should not be allowed to permanently settle on the mountain, fortifying it and transporting enough artillery there, to open the much desired passage up to Dobbiaco, so Goiginger ordered a first action to be carried out on the night between 6 and 7 June.

=== Austrian attack on 7 June 1915 ===
On 7 June, in preparation for the attack, the Austrian artillery began targeting the Italian positions as early as 4 am that day. In the silence of a bad weather night, two assault groups of Standschützen slowly climbed towards the flat top of the mountain, the first assault group leaving from Carbonin under the leadership of second lieutenant Wilhelm Bernhard was the most numerous, he arrived in the western valley around 5.30 am and under the cover of darkness he quickly neutralized the first sentries, and in a short time a tremendous melee broke out, the Italian reinforcements did not take long and rushed from the nearby Italian garrison the men of the 268th Alpine company. Meanwhile, the second unit of attackers arriving from Landro also arrived, making a decisive contribution to the attack in favor of the Austrians.

The clashes were fierce especially around the Carducci pyramid. The Austrians managed to penetrate the Italian trenches, but suffered a counterattack from the Alpine troops with the platoons of second lieutenants Giuseppe De Pluri and Antonio De Toni who both died together with 100 other men.

With the arrival of daylight, the Italian troops, tired and decimated, pushed by the Austrians into the southernmost part of the plateau, were helped by the artillery positioned in Longeres which thus managed to stop the enemy attack and above all the influx of reinforcements; at 2.00 pm the Austrian command, worried by the number of losses due to Italian artillery fire, ordered the front line to be re-established on the northern plateau; in positions that will never be conquered by the Italians during the war. After a few hours the Italians regain possession of the southern plateau without firing a shot. A company and a machine gun section of the 56th Infantry are sent as reinforcements

=== The positions are consolidated: June – July 1915 ===
From the following day the Austrians began to dig deep trenches with barbed wire, despite the fact that the garrison was exposed to rain, cold and hunger, given that the supplies were not arriving as the roads connecting the valley floor were beaten by the Italian artillery which dispersed the carrier file.

The Italian deployment was thus consolidated on the following positions:

- Val Boite subsector (along the Felizon river): two infantry battalions in line and one in reserve at the regimental command in Majon di Valgrande;
- Valle Ansiei subsector from Piz Popena to Vallon dei Castrati one infantry battalion in Val Popena, one on Monte Piana, one in reserve in Forcella Bassa, between Cima delle Saline and Col della Selva, with the regimental command in Misurina;
- Vallon dei Castrati in Forcella Giralba: an infantry battalion from Val Rimbianco to Forcella Col di Mezzo, one in the Cengia and Giralba region, one in reserve at the regimental command in Casoni Crogera.

Furthermore, after the lesson of 7 June, in order to prevent the Austrians from accessing Monte Piana through the Vallon dei Castrati, the Italians sent men to block Val Rimbianco at the height of the Barracks of the same name (between Sasso Gemello and Forcellette ). The Austrian conduct, despite some Italian attacks bloody repelled, did not change, the main attention was dedicated to defense, but offensive attacks and artillery fire were not disdained. On the night of 15 June, an Austrian patrol, in fact, approaching Forcella Giralba at dawn, fired at an Italian lookout, Infantryman Ricciuti, who, although wounded, managed to hold back the Austrians until the arrival of reinforcements.

=== The first Italian attack ===
==== Preparations ====
The Italian command was excessively cautious in the first weeks of the war, and did not take the opportunity to exploit the collapse of the poorly supplied and poorly defended Austrian lines. So after a long period of useless stasis it was decided to attack only after the arrival of a sufficient number of artillery pieces. This numerical superiority was nullified by this period of waiting, which allowed the defenders to decisively consolidate the defense positions. The general Ottavio Ragni issued the order of operations which provided for the attack in force against the Landro and Sesto barrages; with the support of the batteries distributed as follows:

- Artillery of the Fourth Army

Northern Curtain	Passo Tre Croci	Val Padola	Supplementary
1 battery of 149	howitzers 1 battery of 305	howitzers 2 batteries of 210	mortars mountain batteries in Longeres and Lavaredo
1 battery of 210 mortars	1 battery of 280	howitzers 1 battery of 149A guns	3 field batteries in Val Popena
1 battery of 149A guns	1 battery of 149A howitzers	1 battery of 149G guns	country pieces in Longeres
			6 field batteries between Colesei and Col Rosson (Carnia area)

Data taken from:

The attack was entrusted to the Marche brigade, to a company of the Pieve di Cadore battalion with the task of attacking the positions on the ridge and to a battalion of the Como brigade, with the task of bypassing the Austrian positions passing through Carbonin. But the Austrian defensive works on the crest of the Piana attracted the greatest attention of the Italian command, it was the infantrymen under the orders of major Angelo Bosi who had to attack these works. The attack would have taken place along three lines, the main line, divided into 4 platoons, directed towards the works and trenches, the right column directed towards Landro and the left column directed towards Rauhkofel. On the Austrian side, the defense of Monte Piano was entrusted to a battalion of Landesschützen and to a battalion of the'Alpenkorps; on the 19th a battalion of Kaiserjäger will also climb the mountain.

==== The attack ====
At 5 am on 15 July an incessant artillery fire began towards the Austrian positions, Monte Piana and the Carducci pyramid. Three hours later a rocket launched from Villa Loero on Colle S. Angelo, gave the signal for the infantry to sprint forward, as soon as the men set foot out of the trenches, the artillery reaction was waiting for them Austrian attack, which caused 13 Italian deaths and around a hundred minor injuries. Around 1 pm, a company of Alpini along the main route arrives at the Carducci pyramid which was found clear and begins to entrench itself, no longer being able to move towards the Austrian works, after having taken Vallon dei Castrati anyway.

The following morning, it was decided that at midday, the 9th and 11th companies would attack to cover the 400 meters of distance that divided the two enemy lines, and capture the Austrian trenches. When the two companies jumped out of cover, they were greeted by a dense concentration of artillery which forced them to slow down their advance considerably and when they arrived at the Forcella dei Castrati, they were already significantly reduced in momentum and personnel, so that it was not possible to conquer the Austrian lines.

For five days, attacks followed one another on the three routes, as bloody as they were useless. It was possible to drive the Austrians out of the southern plateau and conquer Forcella dei Castrati, but not the important and strategic northern edge of the mountain, which remained unconquered despite repeated attacks. On the last day of the attack alone, 20 July, the Italian figures speak of 104 dead, 578 wounded and 151 missing, most of them disintegrated by enemy artillery. On 17 July Major Bosi and Captain Gregori also lost their lives.

=== The action of the General Luca Montuori ===
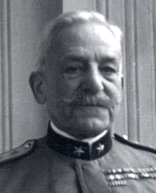
General Luca Montuori.

After the Italian attack, the Austrian troops found themselves with destroyed and unusable positions, reconstruction was only possible at night, and the chronic lack of supplies made the situation worse. In the Italian positions the "Umbria" replaced the "Marche" in the positions from Val Popena to Croda dell'Arghena, while the "Marche" retreated between Somprade and Auronzo di Cadore, at the mouth of the Val Marzon.

And taking advantage of this moment of weakness of the enemy, General Luca Montuori, on 2 August with his division attempted the assault on the defensive bastion of the Sesto barrage, with demonstration actions on Mount Paterno, Monte Piana and Boite valley. The main action managed to seize the summit of Monte Rosso, but was then forced to retreat, while the action on the higher mountains, from the Paterno towards the Bacher, had no success. The third operation was carried out by the Umbria brigade on Monte Piana, with the same operational concept, with three routes like the previous attack, but giving greater weight to the Val Popena route. In fact, the entire 54th Infantry Regiment was assigned here, while two battalions of the 53rd "Umbria" Infantry Regiment were assigned to the ridge. On 3 August, two enemy redoubts were conquered, and the following day the Italian action was suspended due to heavy rain which made the camp impassable and the view insufficient. In the following days, however, the Austrians counterattacked to regain the lost redoubts, but were repelled by the infantrymen of the 9th, 11th and 12th companies.

=== Continue the fight ===
Throughout the month of August, a succession of attacks devastated the Monte Piana plateau, on 11 August, Italian units occupied the western ridge partly in Austrian hands with daring actions by the Alpine troops under the command of Captain Rota and Second Lieutenant Croce, and in the afternoon of the same day violent counterattacks by Bavarian units followed, all of which were repelled. The fight is without respite, at night the Austrians throw hand grenades and fire continuously at the Italian lines so as not to let them rest, the following days there were also violent attacks which resulted in bloody hand-to-hand combat, which on 15 August cost the Austrians more than 100 dead and 44 dead and 64 wounded for the Italians.

Only on 11 September did the Italians launch a serious counterattack, after on 1 September the Austrians conquered the eastern ridge from which the Italians hammered the "pioneer path" on which the enemy porters passed. The Italian commands decide on an outflanking maneuver in the highest sector of the eastern slope, as well as continuing the attacks along the western slope and the Piz Popena, where the fences are however intact. At dawn the action of small and medium caliber artillery began against the northern slopes of Monte Fumo, on the north-west ridge of Monte Piana and against Monte Piano. But due to the poor planning of the attack which incredibly was decided to break through in one of the enemy's best protected points, at 7.30 pm the action was suspended.

The following day the Italian bombing continues, Austrian counterattacks aimed at retaking the Val Popena trench are repelled, and the envelopment of the enemy positions does not proceed. On 13 September the Italian bombing continued and a team of sappers tried again to cut the Monte Piano fence in vain, but the following day the Austrians reacted by attacking along the entire front, but were repelled by the Italian artillery.

On the 14th the Austrians attack along the entire front of lower Val Popena but are repelled by the Italian artillery which however claims 2 pieces hit and one rendered useless. For days and days attacks and counterattacks followed one another with every means, the obstinacy of the Italian command meant that for days patrols were swept away in the attempt to pass the fences of Monte Piano, only on 26 September did the operations end, when the 9th battalion he desists from the action, although pushed by the Brigade commands, who wanted continuous and useless waves towards an unconquerable objective.

=== The winter stalemate ===
Up here winter began already at the end of September, not in silence and peace, [...] but with the fearful din of war. [...] the enemy did not even grant the final rest to their fallen, hundreds of whom remained in front of our fences after bloody attacks, and whom we had buried on the spot; the grenades of the large calibers shook the ground night and day, reopening the ditches. [...]

— Kaiserschütze Heinz von Lichem

The winter climatic difficulties and the obvious difficulty of establishing positions located higher up, caused the idea of a large-scale action on Monte Piana to fade, nor on neighboring regions. The sporadic actions and disturbance actions did not stop but did not there were several major Italian actions on the Monte Piana front. Both sides, but especially the Austrian one, thought about strengthening their positions and adapting them to the harsh winter climate. On the Austrian side, the first Austrian cableway was put into operation, and work began on the heavy cableway from Dürrensee, electricity was also supplied to the Austrian plants.

Work wasalso underway on the Italian side to complete the shelters and advanced positions in preparation for the winter. In December, General Nava was replaced with General Mario Nicolis of Robilant, and both sides began a new war, the one against the rigors of winter, the Landesschützen fixed the power line for the lighting of the barracks on the northern plateau and for the use of a portable reflector. In early January the Austrian heavy cableway was completed and 3 Flamethrowers and 3 Minenwerfer were sent to the garrison. But it was not only firearms that cause death, but also avalanches, like the one on March 5 which swept away 150 Austrian men, who searched for their comrades for 17 hours, but without encountering any offensive action from the Italians who didn't even one shot.

== 1916 ==
=== Spring Operations ===
The clashes between the two factions resumed on 1 April, with a series of Italian attacks to conquer the 1979 quota of Monte Fumo, the first launched by a unit of infantry at around 08.00 of the same day, which led to the capture of 33 Austrians, and the occupation of the saddle north-east of Monte Fumo, and the Costabella ridge. The back and forth of enemy artillery continues for days, the hilltop in Italian hands is relentlessly pounded by enemy fire, so the Italian command decides to attack the height from which the Austrians are pounding the Italian garrison. Unfortunately the Austrians also prepared for an attack aimed at regaining the position of Monte Fumo, the clash was terrible, both sides did not give up ground, but the losses were high for both, 60% for the Austrians and 40% for the Italians, and despite everything the next morning 350 Austrians continued the attack, retaking the Costabella position which cost the Italians 70 wounded and 140 missing.

For the rest of the spring the Italian commands gave up on advancing, but continued to disturb the transit of Austrian troops and materials, continuously beating the stations of Dobbiaco and San Candido. It was consequently decided to place a section of 305mm howitzers in a favorable position to hammer enemy positions. The necessary work required the commitment of a few hundred men for 3 months, but in the second half of May 1916 the first shots fell on S. Candido.

1916 saw a progressive strengthening of the positions, especially on the Austrian side who transformed the entire northern summit of Monte Piano into a network of defensive works, including covered trenches, connecting tunnels, tunnels, caves equipped for different functions, from dormitories to kitchens. For their part, the Italians, with larger forces but with disadvantaged positions, continued the very slow advance on the northern plateau in enemy hands, managing in August to conquer the so-called "alpine ditch".

=== The fight for the "Kuppe K" ===
Since the time of the envelopment action, the Austrians had occupied a place on the north-east corner of the Alpine Ditch from which to target the Forcellette, and had named it Kuppe K ("Point K"). Fearing an Italian advance on the northern plateau, the Austrians carried out a massive attack against the Italians, also extending to the Forcella dei Castrati to completely destroy the Italian offensive structure. The attack had to be conducted by exploiting the surprise factor, so it was planned without artillery support and under the cover of darkness. The troops penetrated the Italian trenches which were empty, destroyed them and returned undisturbed to their starting positions.

At the beginning of August, however, the Austrian command considered possession of the Forcella dei Castrati and Kuppe K indispensable, so a new successful attack was ordered. Attacks and counterattacks followed one another, on 23 August a unit of the Umbria Brigade conquered Kuppe K, but two days later there was a new Austrian attempt which ended with the death of 47 attackers out of 51. The reconquest took place by a contingent of 60 others Kaiserschützen. The Austrian reinforcements were not long in coming and allowed us to entrench ourselves in a better way, but the Italians did not stand idly by, they dug a tunnel between the nearby trenches and the Kuppe K, and by surprise, at night, after a heavy bombardment, an Italian platoon of Arditi managed to regain the position, capturing the entire enemy garrison.

=== The winter stalemate ===
The Italians therefore thought about reinforcing their positions again, with machine gun nests and bombardments along the rocky edge overlooking the Val Rinbianco. The Austrians also improved their positions, but also improved the connections with Dürrensee, but the offensive actions did not stop. On 17 October the Italian artillery discharged more than 1,000 shells on the northern summit of Mount Piana causing serious losses and extensive damage. But winter is inexorable, on December 13 on Mount Piana there were 7 meters of snow and −42 °C, the white death in this period caused more victims than firefights. On some days the changeover took place after just 30 minutes to avoid the risk of freezing, and the offensive actions took a decided place in the background.

== 1917 ==
=== Summer 1917 ===
Throughout the winter and autumn of 1917 there were no substantial events, but the war of attrition continued its macabre ritual of bombings, clashes between patrols, attempted enemy infiltrations, but in that winter the tension was maximum, tunnels were being dug on both sides for the land mines, the Mine chambers, both Austro-Hungarians and Italians were working feverishly to dig and at the same time understand where he was working the enemy.

Towards spring, the commander of the 61st Mountain Brigade, Colonel Von Kramer, considered the total conquest of the southern summit indispensable, while Major General Von Steinhart was skeptical in the face of such an undertaking. The operational plan proposed as an objective the construction of a tunnel for the placement of mines beneath the Italian positions located around the Carducci pyramid. The works continued throughout the spring and summer, and when the tunnel was about to be completed the order came to stop the work as the Austrians were convinced that the mine operation had been suspended on the Italian side. In fact that was the case.

=== The Austrian plan ===
The Austrian attack launched on Monte Piana on 22 October 1917, although it was conducted with extreme violence, had only the aim of distracting the Italian troops from large tactical movements and to hold back the Italian reserves in Cadore; so as not to let them flow towards the other large-scale attack that would have been conducted at Kobarid.

At the beginning of September the situation of the Austrian garrison on Mount Piana was worsening, the Italians always perfectly covered by the artillery, were advancing cautiously but inexorably towards the enemy positions, the idea of a massive operation was therefore approved (which coincided with the great offensive in the upper Isonzo) indicated with the code name Herbst operation.

=== The final battle of Monte Piana ===
At 6.00 on 21 October 1917, intense artillery fire began which put the Italian positions on fire for 13 hours. The day after 22 October at 5.00 in the morning, over a hundred artillery pieces, Bombard and mine launchers concentrated their fire on the Italian positions. Kaiserjäger in a first attempt they came out of the trenches trying to overcome the fences, which however they did not cross due to the Italian machine guns, despite the response, the Austrian artillery began to furiously hammer the enemy lines and some positions again Italians fell under the fire of the flamethrowers of the German 'Alpenkorps. That day the Austrians in the action destroyed 3 platoons Italians, among these the V Assault Department of General Robilant which stood out for its great valor and temerity and was sent near Misurina under the 54th Regiment Infantry of the Umbria brigade. That day at five in the morning, over a hundred Austrian guns concentrated their fire on the Italian positions. The Austrian kaiserjägers came out of their trenches below and with Austrian bombards and mine launchers they continued their work of conquest and destruction so some Italian positions had to be abandoned . In an attempt to reconquer them, the Italian Commands decided to use the platoon of the V Assault Department belonging to the Arditi corps who, despite the danger, counterattacked with enthusiasm in a desperate attempt to contain the Austrians. Sublime example of heroism and patriotic love (gold medal) Ruggero De Simone Lieutenant commander of the first assault platoon was wounded by a grenade splinter in the mouth amidst the rain of fire but continued to maintain command against the devastating and incessant enemy fire incited his comrades to attack. Coming into direct contact with the Kaiserjäger in hand-to-hand combat, he was wounded in an arm and then in a leg. The Austrians then in clear supremacy ordered him to surrender but in response they received shots from his service pistol and the cry: "Long live Italy!". Wounded a third time and fallen to a second Austrian surrender call, he replied "no, Long live Italy". Finally shot in the heart, he died in a strenuous attempt to defend his country. On that dramatic day the Austrians conquered some trenches on which the Italian artillery shells were fired, causing 93 deaths and 84 injuries on the Austrian side and 3 deaths and 11 injuries

Every 15 minutes the 280mm mortar on Mount Tre Croci fired a shot at the Austrian positions, the artillery flashes did not cease throughout the night of 22 October, and at 6.00 the Arditi and some companies of Alpini attacked with enthusiasm, reconquering, as in a sad game, the positions they had just lost. That of 22 October was the last action at Monte Piana, since, as expected by the Austrians, on 3 November all the Italian units had to abandon their positions to head towards the Piave, in the last desperate attempt at an Austrian attack.

== Result ==
In the end the two years of war on Monte Piana essentially led to a stalemate, the two contenders fought each other on a small plot of land for two long years, without ever managing to subvert the enemy forces. On one side there were the Austrians with the notable advantage of an elevated position from which to effectively counter enemy attacks, on the other side the Italians, since the beginning of the conflict, superior in armament and numbers, who never succeeded, for the common stubbornness in the commands during the World War I to attack all the way and frontally, to conquer and maintain possession of the conquered enemy positions. On the other hand, the harsh climatic conditions that decimated both sides and the unusual terrain of battle did not make things easier; avalanches, cold and accidents along almost impassable paths caused more victims than the firefights, which in truth, already after the summer 1915 were sporadic and often short-lived.

Furthermore, the defensive attitude of the Austrians, already engaged on the Eastern Front, favored by the mountainous territory, allowed the defenders to barricade themselves for years along the entire Dolomite front without ever giving up, indeed, this attitude allowed the Austrians to organize themselves and break through the Italian lines in a last major offensive at Caporetto on 24 October, just two days after the last offensive on Mount Piana.

In this theater of war a long war of attrition took place, the signs of which are still clearly visible today in that open-air museum which is Monte Piana trenches, tunnels and fences can still be visited thanks to the work of the "Amici delle Dolomiti" association created in 1981 by the Austrian colonel Walther Schaumann.

== See also ==
- Alpini and Mountain Artillery formations in World War I
- Mines on the Italian front (World War I)
- Austro-Hungarian fortifications on the Italian border
- Mountain warfare

== Sources ==
- Antonio Berti (2005) [1982]. Guerra in Ampezzo e Cadore. Milano: Mursia.
- Schaumann Walter, Monte Piana, Ghedina & Tassotti, 1986
- Meneghetti Nazzareno, Montepiana, Tip. Marchesini, Conegliano, 1965
- Mario Spada, Monte Piana 1915/1917, guida storica ed escursionistica, itinera progetti, Bassano del Grappa, 2009
- Antonio Berti (2005) [1982]. Guerra in Ampezzo e Cadore. Milano: Mursia.
- Ingomar Pust: Die steinerne Front. Vom Isonzo zur Piave. Auf den Spuren des Gebirgskrieges in den Julischen Alpen. Ares, Graz, 3rd edn. 2009. ISBN 978-3-902475-62-6.
- Der einsame Krieg. Hornung, Munich 1974, ISBN 3-87364-031-7, Athesia, Issues. 2–7, 1976–2007, ISBN 978-88-7014-174-0.
- Spielhahnstoss und Edelweiss – Die Geschichte der Kaiserschützen. Leopold Stocker, Graz 1977, ISBN 3-7020-0260-X.
- Heinz von Lichem: Der Tiroler Hochgebirgskrieg 1915–1918 im Luftbild. Steiger, Innsbruck 1985, ISBN 3-85423-052-4.
- Heinz von Lichem: Gebirgskrieg 1915–1918. (3 vols.), Athesia, Bozen.
  - Ortler, Adamello, Gardasee. (Vol. 1) 1996, ISBN 88-7014-175-6.
  - Die Dolomitenfront von Trient bis zum Kreuzbergsattel. (Vol. 2) 1997, ISBN 88-7014-236-1.
- Erwin Steinböck: Die Kämpfe um den Plöckenpaß 1915/17. Militärhistorische Schriftenreihe, Heft 2. Österreichischer Bundesverlag Gesellschaft m. b. H., Vienna 1988, ISBN 3-215-01650-8.
- Uwe Nettelbeck: Der Dolomitenkrieg. Zweitausendeins: Frankfurt/M. 1979. Eine Neuausgabe erschien 2014, bebildert und mit einem Nachwort von Detlev Claussen. Berenberg, Berlin, ISBN 978-3-937834-71-9.
