= Schluderbach =

Settlement in Trentino-Alto Adige/Südtirol, Italy

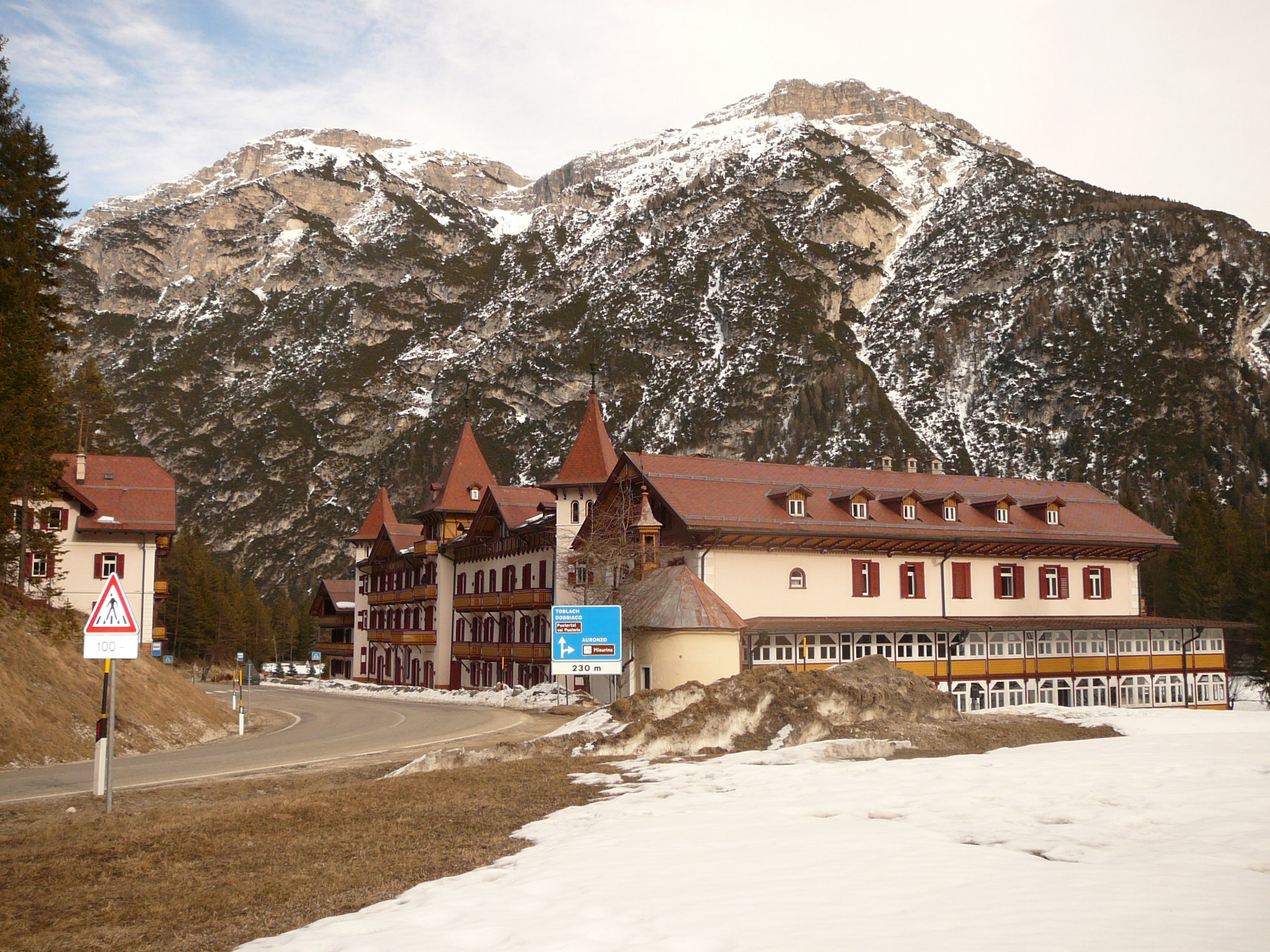
Gasthof Ploner, Schluderbach

Schluderbach (Italian: Carbonin) is a settlement in the municipality of Toblach in South Tyrol, Italy, until 1918 part of the Austro-Hungarian County of Tyrol. It is largely a holiday village.

== Location ==
Schluderbach lies about 1,440 metres (4,720 ft) above sea level in the Höhlensteintal, a valley which forms an important route between Toblach and Cortina d'Ampezzo in the province of Belluno. Here the Popena Valley branches off to the south-east, in the direction of Lake Misurina. To the south is the Cristallo group of mountains, to the east is Monte Piana and the Three Peaks. The nearest village to the north is Höhlenstein, three kilometers to the west is the mountain pass Im Gemärk, at a height of 1,530 metres (5,020 ft).

== History ==
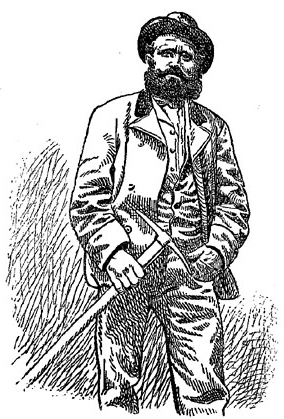
Michael Innerkofler

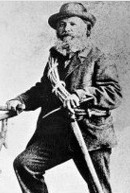
Santo Siorpaes

At the beginning of the 19th century, when the locality was part of the Austro-Hungarian County of Tyrol, there was a timber trading post on the site of today's Schluderbach named in Italian Al Carbonin ("at the charcoal burner’s"), as charcoal burners worked there. A local farmer called Hans Ploner from Alt-Schluderbach (Carbonin Vecchia), a hamlet of Toblach near Niederdorf, opened an inn near this post called "Beim Schluderbacher", which gave the place its name. Hans Ploner's son Georg, called "Der Alte Schluderbacher", was able to establish the inn as an important base for the up-and-coming sport of mountaineering in the Dolomites. In 1872, he employed the brothers Hans and Michael Innerkofler as mountain guides. Other well-known alpinists of the time, such as Santo Siorpaes, led climbing tours from here, including many first ascents. Such well-known guides drew in rich climbing guests, and Schluderbach became the leading base for tours to the Three Peaks.

In 1874, Georg Ploner's daughter Anna was the first woman to reach the summit of the Great Peak, the highest of the Three Peaks, and Ploner himself was a mountaineer, in 1879 making the first ascent of the Western Peak.

The composer Gustav Mahler and his family spent much of the summer of 1907 at Schluderbach.

During the First World War, Austria and Italy fought each other, and the international border between them then ran about one kilometre south-east of Schluderbach. The present-day border between the South Tyrol and the province of Belluno was roughly the front line in the White War fought between the two countries from 1915 to 1917. During that war, both sides built railways to support their war effort, the Italians building the Dolomites Railway as far as Toblach, which reached Schluderbach in 1917. After the general Italian retreat of 1917, the whole line fell into the hands of the Austrians, but the situation was reversed at the end of the war, in November 1918, when this mostly German-speaking area was occupied by the Kingdom of Italy, and in 1919 it was annexed by Italy.

The Dolomites Railway was closed in 1962.

Today Schluderbach has only a few houses, most of which are hotels and holiday homes, and is chiefly a holiday destination.

== Gallery ==
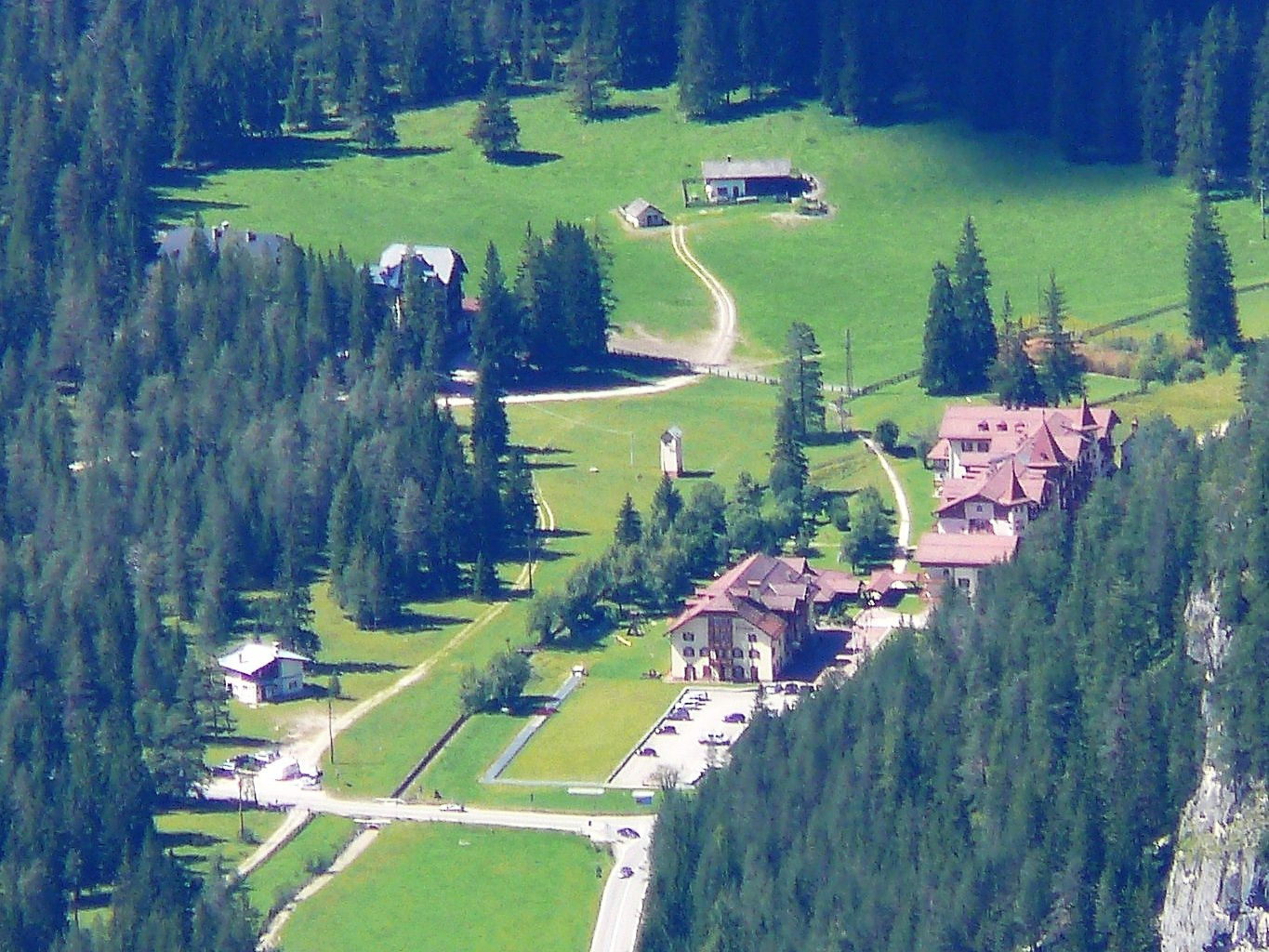
Schluderbach from the north

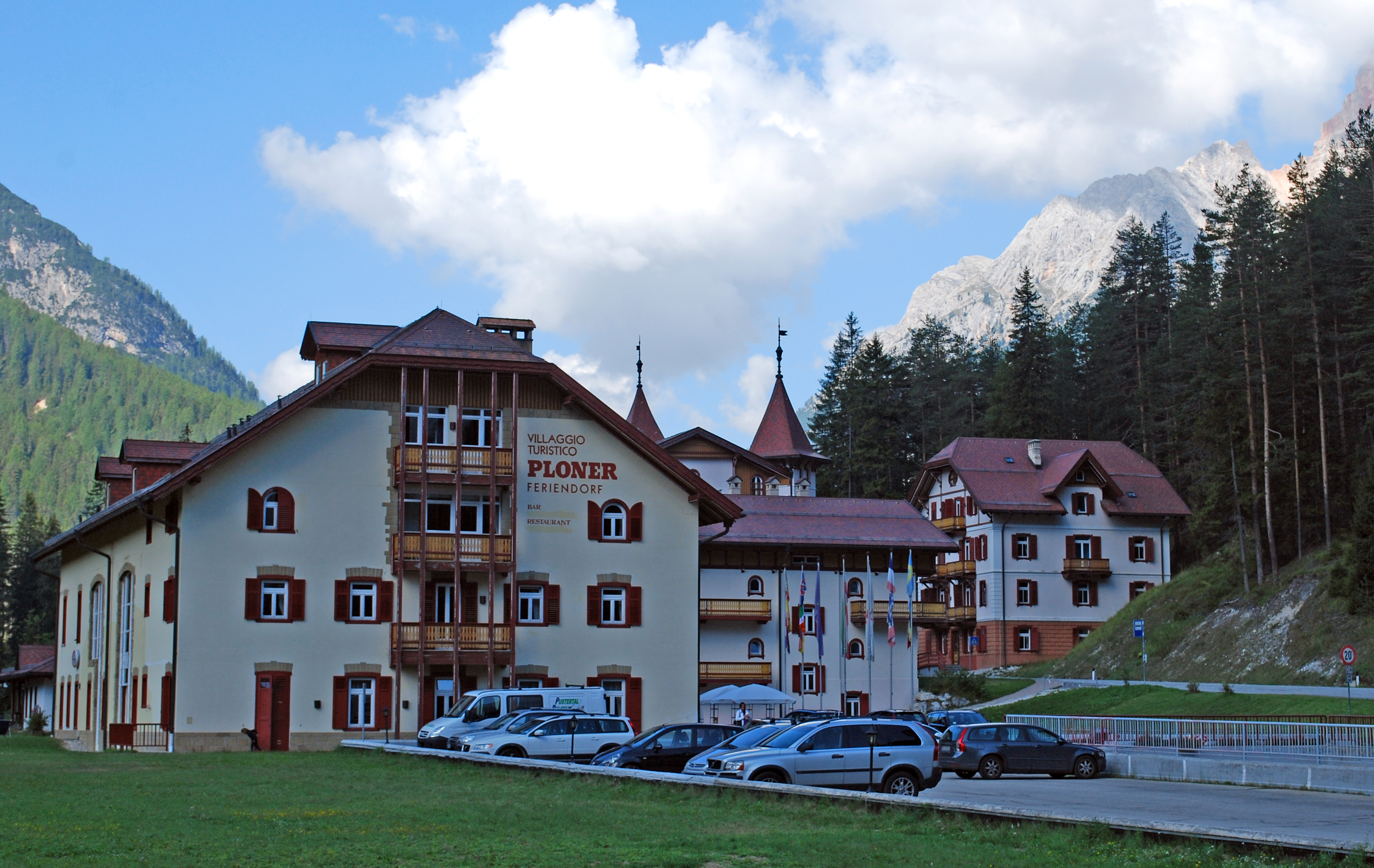
Ploner Feriendorf

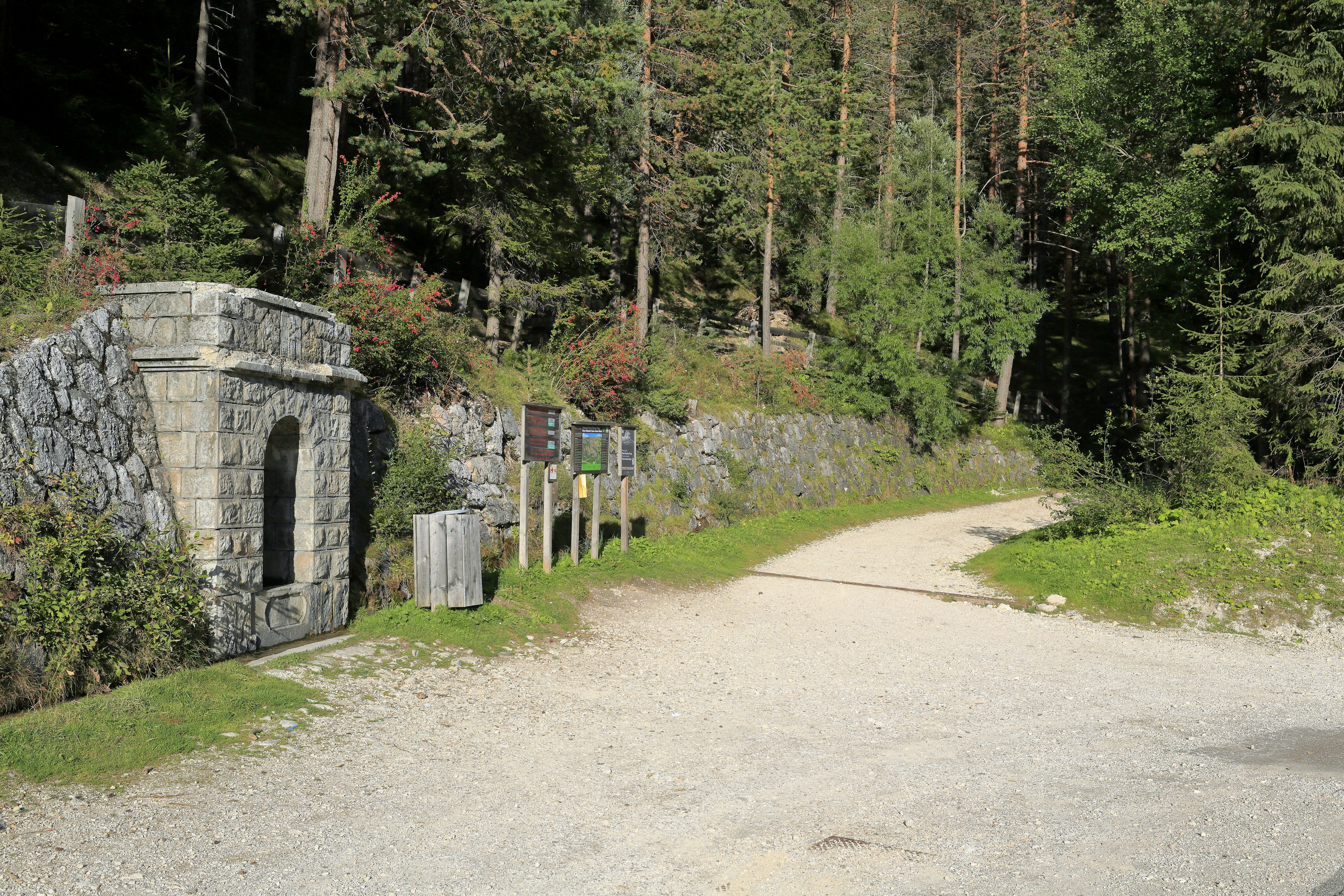
Abzw Schluderbach

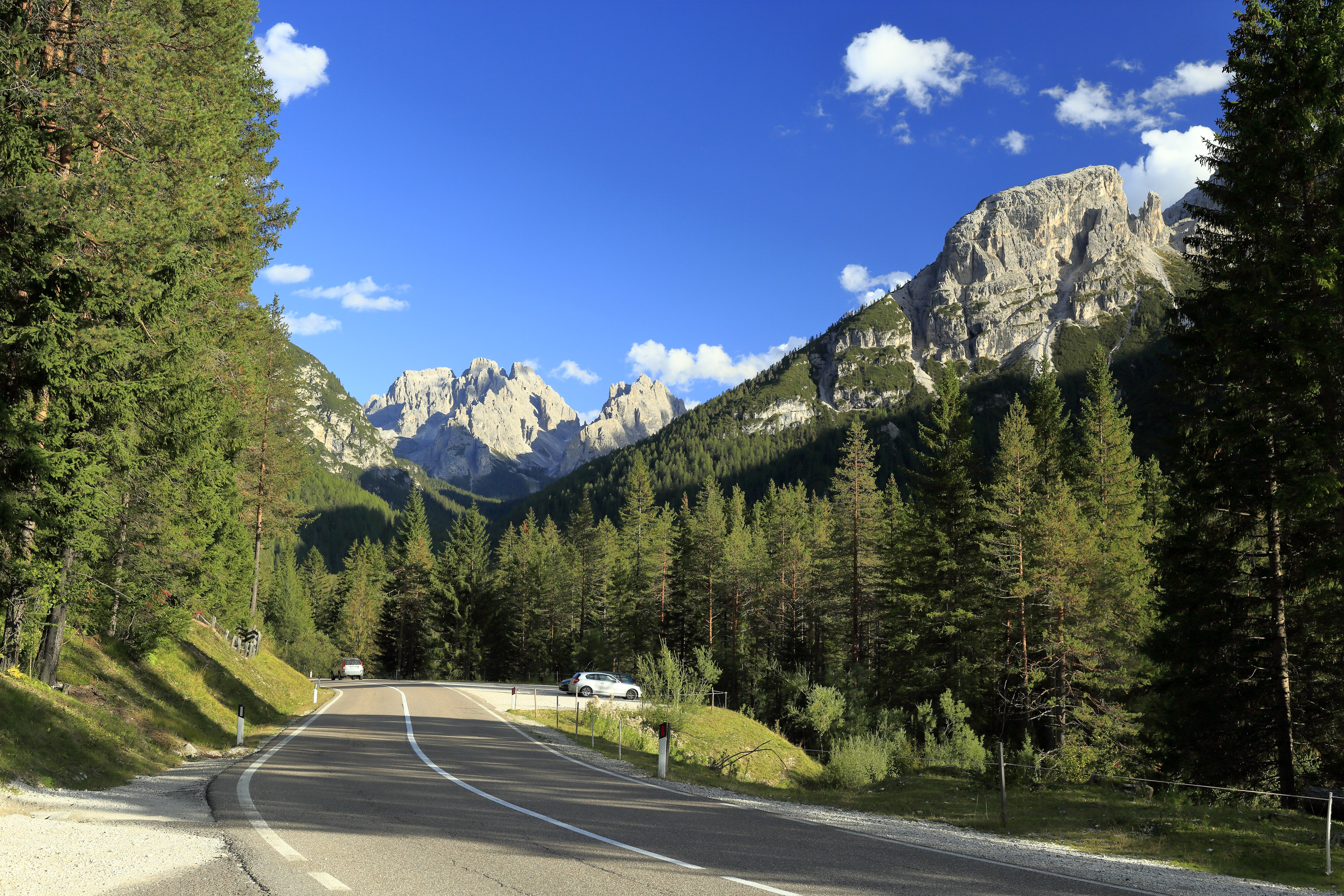
Schluderbach, Cadini Group

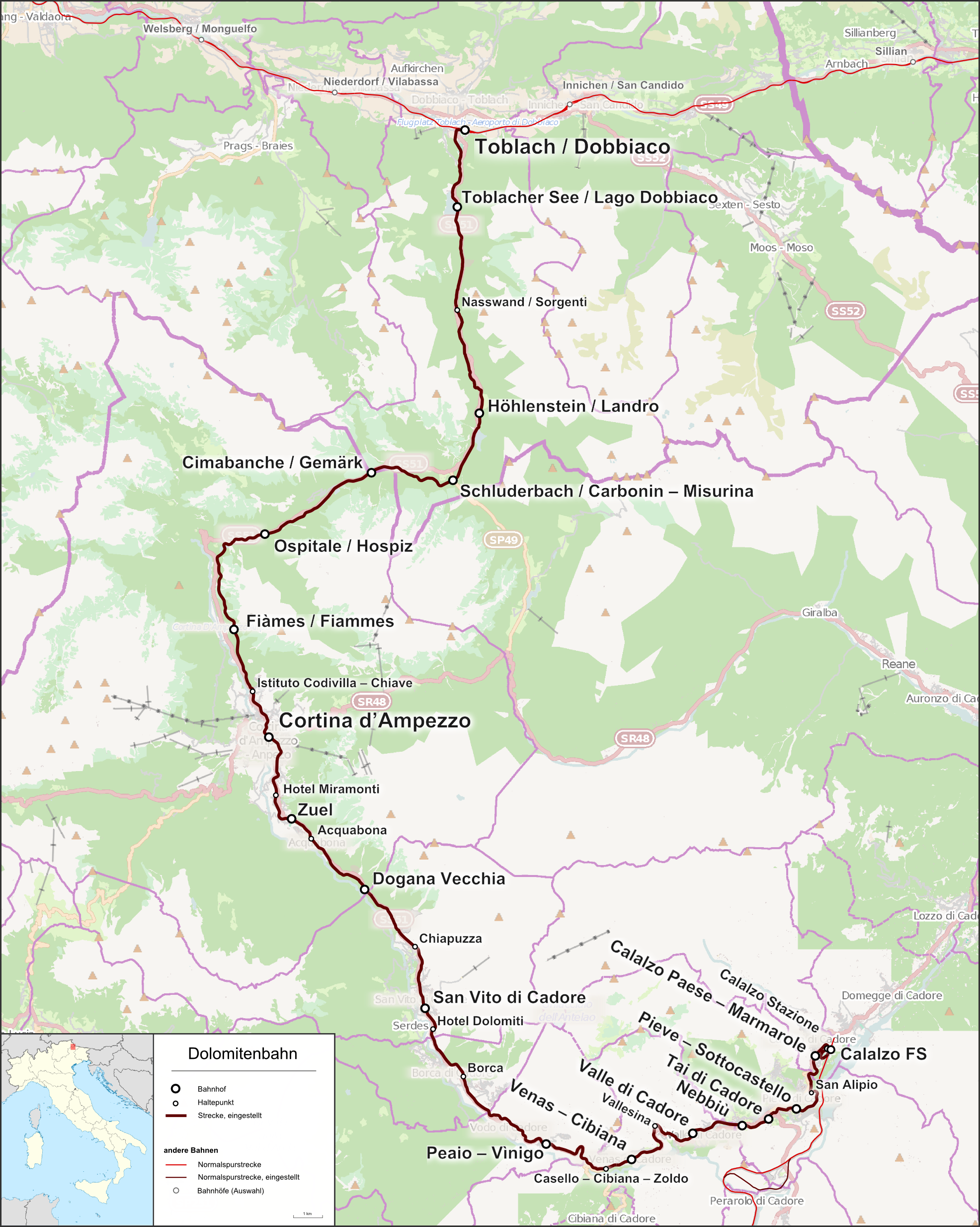
Former Dolomites Railway
