= Landro =

Landro may refer to:

== People ==
- Magne Landrø, a Norwegian sport shooter
- Vegar Landro, a Norwegian footballer who plays for Bryne FK

== Places ==
- Landro Church, a church in Øygarden municipality in Vestland county, Norway
- Landro, Vestland, a village in Øygarden municipality in Vestland county, Norway
- Landro, Sicily, a village on the island of Sicily in Italy
- Lago di Landro, a lake in the Dolomite mountains in South Tyrol, Italy
- Landro (Galicia), a river in the region of Galicia in Spain
