= Christine Reid =

American mountaineer and filmmaker

Christine Lincoln Reid
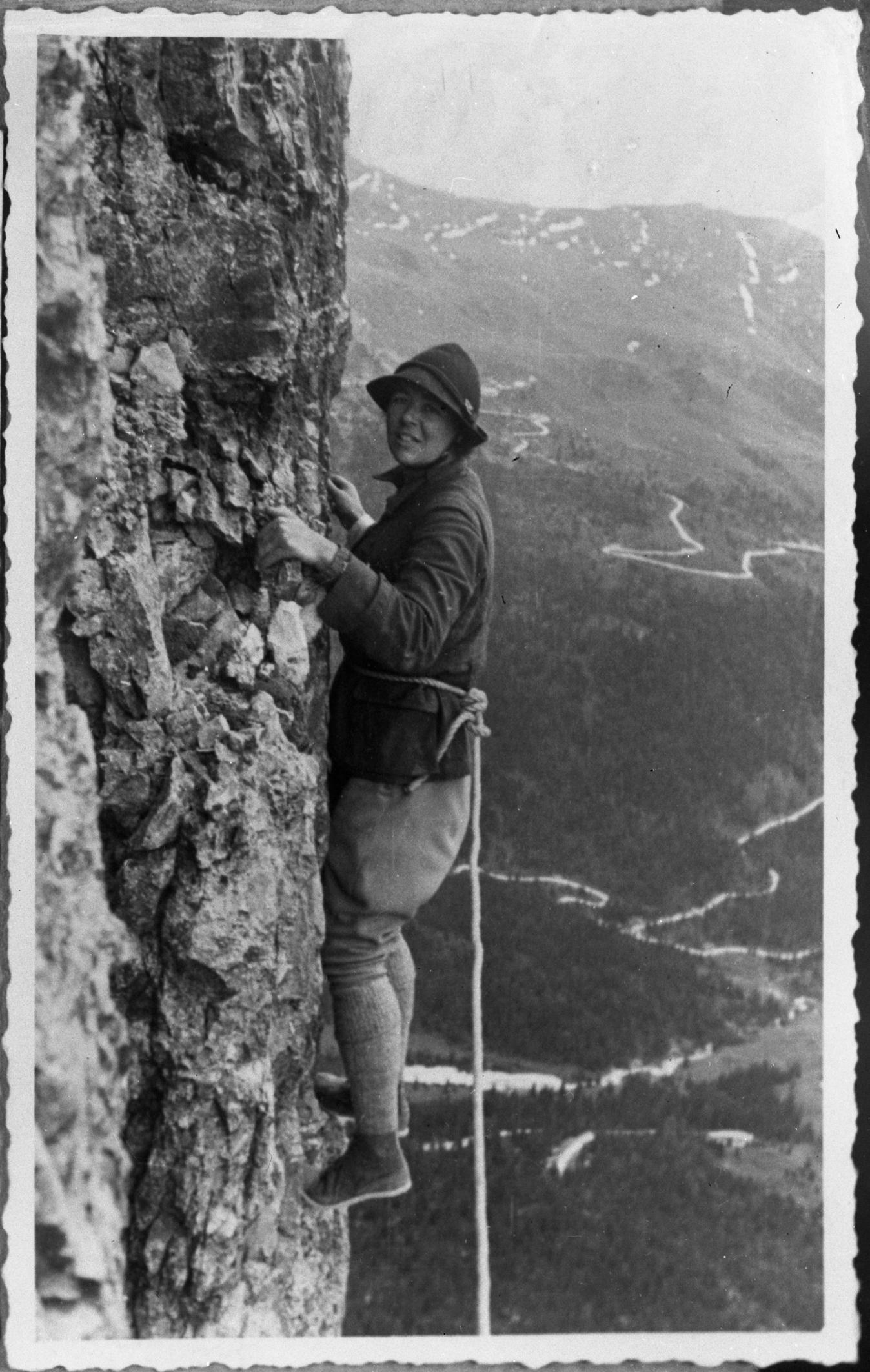
- Christine L. Reid in the Dolomites, 1936
- Born: May 8, 1906; Belmont, California
- Died: May 4, 1990 (aged 83); Buzzards Bay, Massachusetts
- Other names: Pussy Reid, Pooh Reid

Christine Lincoln Reid (May 8, 1906 - May 4, 1990) was a mountaineer and filmmaker, the first woman to climb Mount Columbia in Canada. Reid started mountain climbing in her early 20s. Her early ascents included Assiniboine and the Grand Teton. In 1936 she made many climbs in the Dolomites; discovering a new route on the Piz Popena south wall, which is named Via Christine for her.

She was also an early film maker and documentarian. Her 16mm silent film "Klettershuh: Climbing in the Dolomites" was featured at the Tenth Annual Little Movie Party in 1939 at the Barbizon-Plaza Theatre, in New York, NY. Another silent film, "Fundamentals of Skiing" showed a man demonstrating skiing basics at the foot of the Matterhorn in Zermatt, Switzerland while title cards give added explanation and instruction.

Reid was on the editorial board of Appalachia. She wrote for the American Alpine Journal, the Boston Transcript and the Boston Globe. She helped develop the New England chapter of the Explorer's Club and was a member of the Women's Travel Club and trustee of the American Alpine Club Research Fund.

== Personal life ==
Reid was born on May 8, 1906, to William Thomas Reid Jr. and Christine William Lincoln. Reid married Philip Dana Orcutt in 1941. The marriage ended in divorce in 1955.
