= Grand Hotel Misurina =

Former Hotel in Misurina, Italy

Grand Hotel Misurina (Istituto Pio XII)
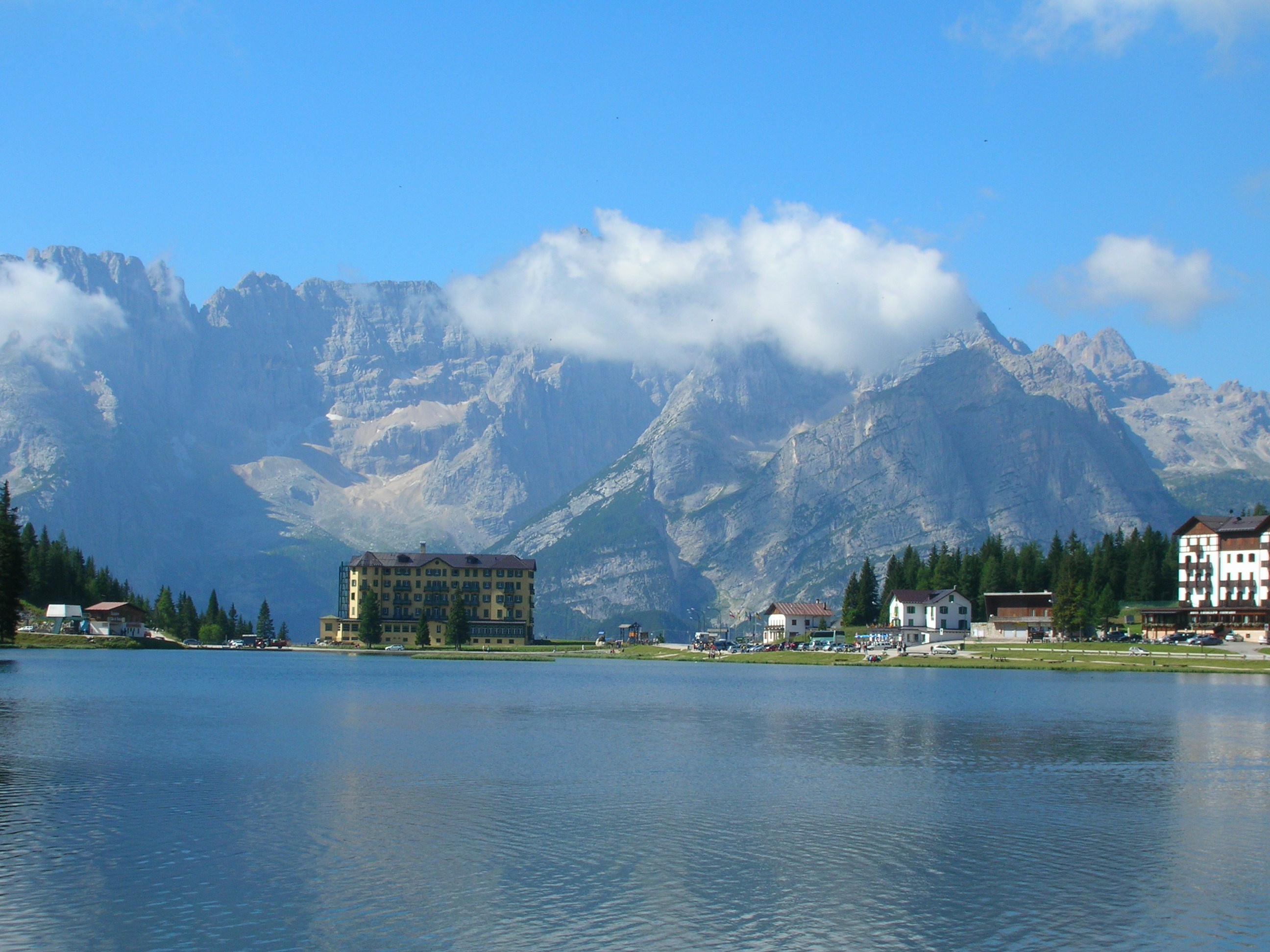
- The Istituto Pio XII (originally the Grand Hotel Misurina) in 2008

General information
- Location: Lake Misurina, Auronzo di Cadore, Italy
- Coordinates: 46°34′40.72″N 12°15′08.24″E
- Opened: 1899; 127 years ago
- Closed: 2022

The Grand Hotel Misurina, more recently serving as the Institute Pius XII (Istituto Pio XII), was a historic luxury hotel located on the shores of Lake Misurina in the Dolomites, Italy. The structure should not be confused with the currently operating and identically named Grand Hotel Misurina, based in a newer and unrelated establishment on the north shore of Lake Misurina.

== History ==
The hotel was built between 1896 and 1899 on the shores of Lake Misurina by a partnership formed by Angelo Barnabò, Osvaldo Bombassei, Vittore Da Vià, Giovanni Perini, Aldo Apollonio and Joseph Rohracher. Inaugurated as a luxury hotel, it hosted Queen Margherita for about a month in July 1900, shortly after the assassination of her husband, Umberto I of Italy. During her stay, the queen witnessed the completion of the nearby Chapel of Our Lady of Health. After the royal stay, the name of the hotel was changed into Grand Hotel Savoia. During World War I, the building housed the Italian military command engaged in the battle on nearby Monte Piana and suffered some damage and loss of furniture.

Restored and renamed after the war as Grand Hotel delle Alpi e Misurina, the building hosted several other distinguished guests, including Prince Umberto in 1926, Italo Balbo and Guglielmo Marconi in 1932, as well as writer Filippo Tommaso Marinetti in 1935. The establishment served as a hotel until 1940.

=== Repurposing as the Istituto Pio XII, a pediatric asthma treatment center ===
The building was purchased by the Diocese of Parma in 1950. From 1970, it was operated as a pediatric institute, rechristened Istituto Pio XII, dedicated exclusively to the diagnosis, treatment, and rehabilitation of childhood bronchial asthma until its closure in 2022. Proposals for its relaunch have been unsuccessful, and the building now stands empty except for routine servicing.

== Description ==
The hotel is located at about 1,780 meters above sea level, on the southern shore of Lake Misurina, with a view of the Tre Cime di Lavaredo and the Sorapiss.
