= Dolomites Railway =

Former railway line in Northern Italy

Coordinates: 46°32′17″N 12°08′26″E

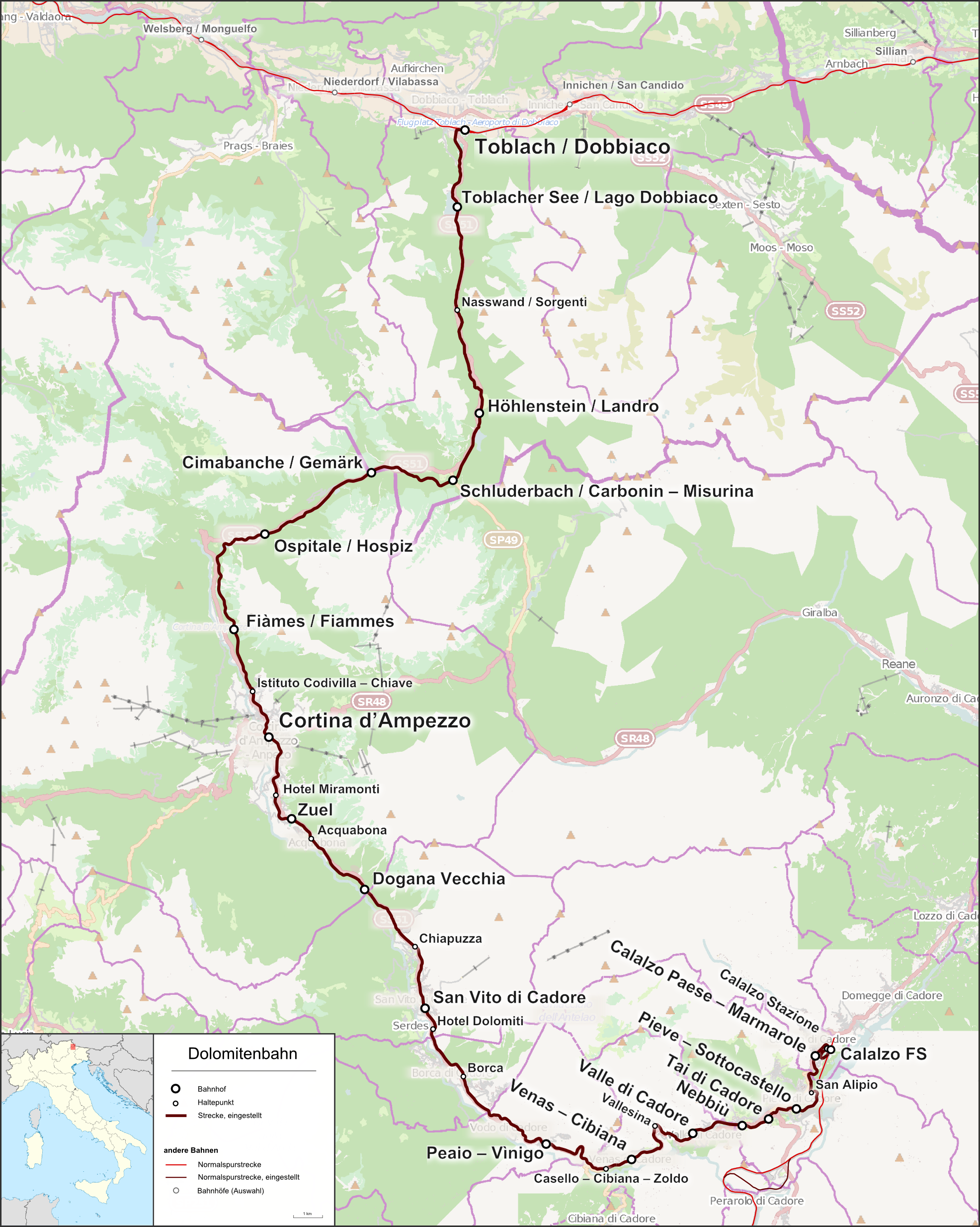
Map of the Dolomites Railway

The Dolomites Railway (German: Dolomitenbahn, Italian: Ferrovia delle Dolomiti), originally the Ampezzaner Bahn or Ampezzaner Railway, was a railway in Northern Italy crossing the Dolomites mountains. The 64.9-kilometre (40.3-mile) long railway began in Calalzo and ended in Toblach. Its gauge was 950 mm — "Italian metre gauge". The Cortina d'Ampezzo - Toblach part was closed in 1962 and the Cortina d'Ampezzo - Calalzo di Cadore in 1964. Two EMUs went to the Trento - Malè railway and are still in use. Other vehicles went to the Ferrovie Appulo Lucane.

== Construction ==
The line was begun in 1916 to supply the military needs of the White War, when Italy attempted to annex the Austrian province of South Tyrol. Both sides sought to construct railways to supply their troop operations among the peaks of the Dolomite range. On the Italian side a steam-operated 750mm narrow gauge line was extended northwards from Calalzo towards Cortina, while in the north the Austrians built a 700mm gauge feldbahn track southwards (with motive power from small petrol locomotives) from a military supply depot at Höhlenstein. After the general Italian retreat of 1917 the whole route came under Austrian administration but the situation was reversed at the end of the war, when Italy was handed the former Austrian province. The Italian government then completed the line using money provided as reparation by the Austrian side, where possible using the route of the respective military railways. The ruling gradient was 3.5% (1 in 29) with a minimum curve radius of 60 metres (66 yards). Opening was on 15 June 1921. Electrification was achieved in 1929 at 2700V DC, with a single sub-station at Cortina.

== Reopening ==
In February 2016 the regional governments of The Veneto and Trentino-Alto Adige announced that they were to commission a feasibility study to build a new line between Calalzo, Cortina and Toblach but in May 2021 regional president Luca Zaia announced that a line following the original route, while still under consideration, was not the most favoured solution. In September 2025 Rete Ferroviaria Italiana, the national body responsible for rail infrastructure, reported that the scheme was not viable because of projected low demand and high cost.

== Gallery ==
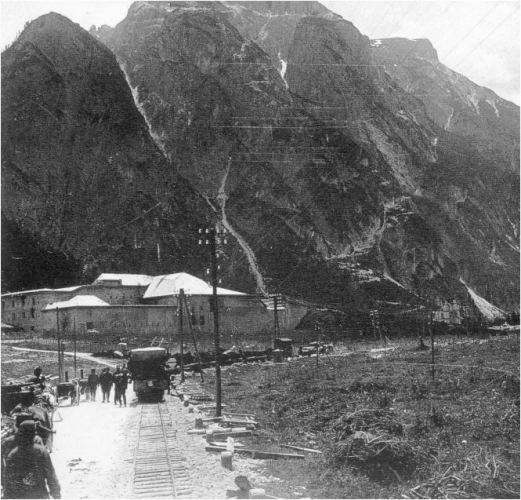
Northern end of the original military railway. The Austrian supply base is within the fort.

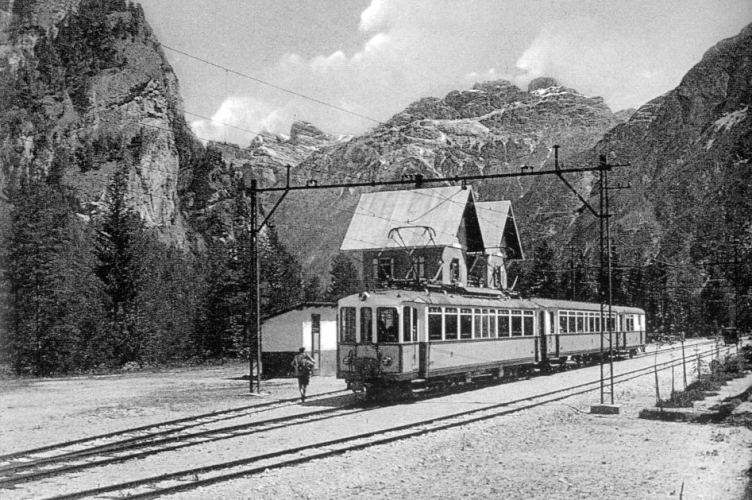
Carbonin station, between Cortina and Toblach

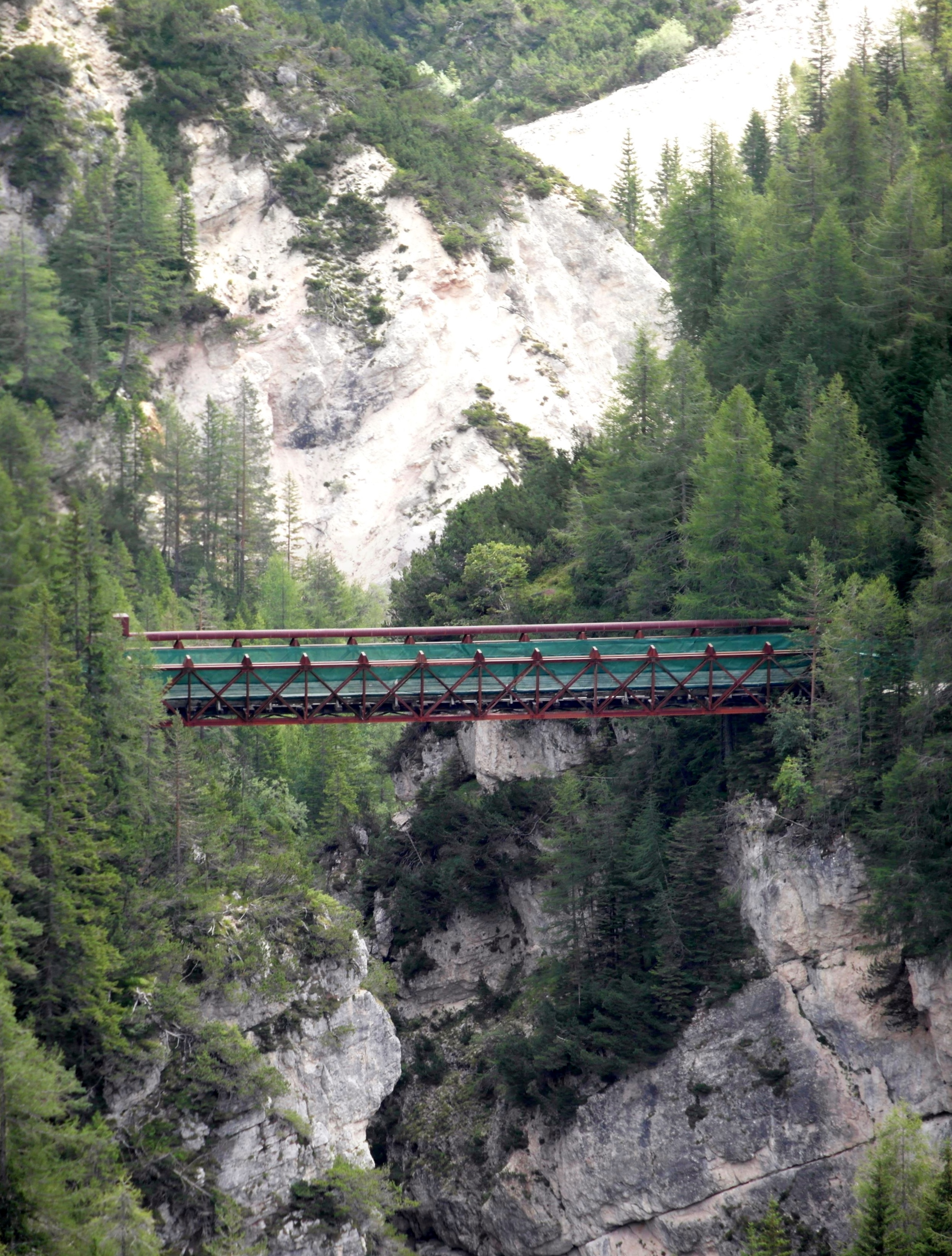
Austrian military engineers' bridge over the Felizon river near Cortina

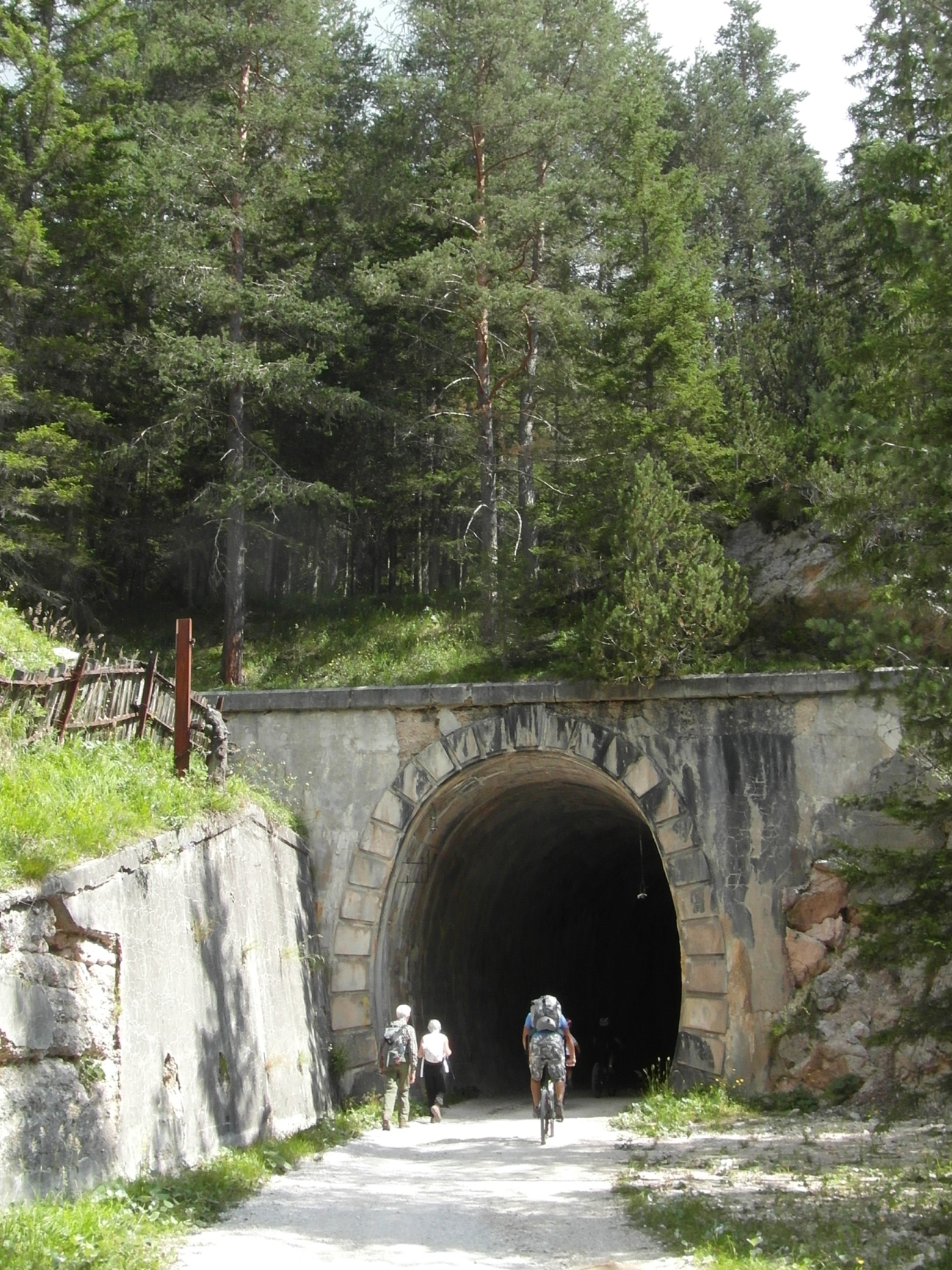
adjacent tunnel
