= Ludwig Goiginger =

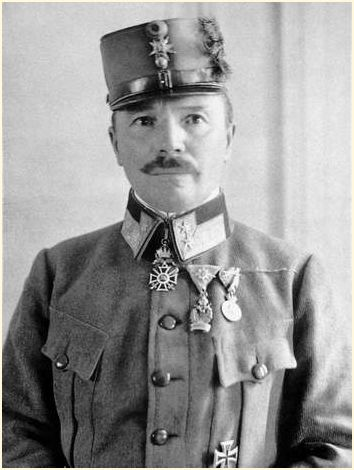
- Born: 11 August 1863; Verona, Kingdom of Lombardy–Venetia, Austrian Empire
- Died: 28 August 1931 (aged 68); Graz-Neustift, Austria
- Military career
- Allegiance: Austria-Hungary
- Branch: Austro-Hungarian Army
- Service years: 1884–1918
- Commands: 122nd Infantry Brigade; 32nd Infantry Division; Goiginger Group; 73rd Infantry Division; 60th Infantry Division; XXIV Army Corps; XXVIII Corps
- Conflicts: World War I: Battle of the Carpathians; Battle of Monte Piana; Eleventh Battle of the Isonzo; Battle of Caporetto; Second Battle of the Piave River; Battle of Saint-Mihiel
- Awards: Military Order of Maria Theresa

Ludwig Goiginger (11 August 1863 – 28 August 1931) was an Austro-Hungarian Lieutenant Field Marshal who served during World War I.

== Biography ==
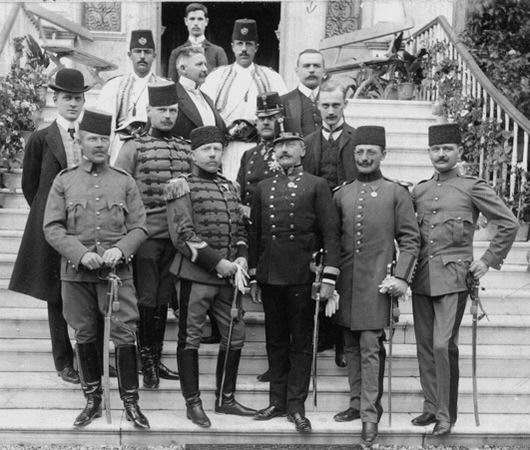
Austro-Hungarian military mission in Skopje, led by Wladimir Giesl von Gieslingen and Alfred Rappaport von Arbengau, c. 1903–1907

=== Early life ===
After graduating from high school in Salzburg, Goiginger entered the military engineer cadet school at Vienna in 1881. In 1884 he joined the Genie Regiment 2 in Krems and was appointed a lieutenant. After attending the War Academy from 1888 to 1890, Goiginger was assigned to the General Staff Corps as an adjutant, and was given a permanent position in 1893. He was promoted to colonel in 1906. From 1907 to 1908, Goiginger was a "military assistant" in the Austro-Hungarian mission, part of an international mission responsible for supervising the Ottoman Gendarmerie in Macedonia, and he fought the armed bands around Skopje in the Kosovo Vilayet. After more than 20 years of staff activity, he took over command of the newly established 122nd Infantry Brigade in Bruneck on 27 February 1912, which was assigned in peace to the 8th Infantry Division (FML Johann Freiherr von Kirchbach auf Lauterbach), and was promoted to major general in May 1912.

=== World War I ===
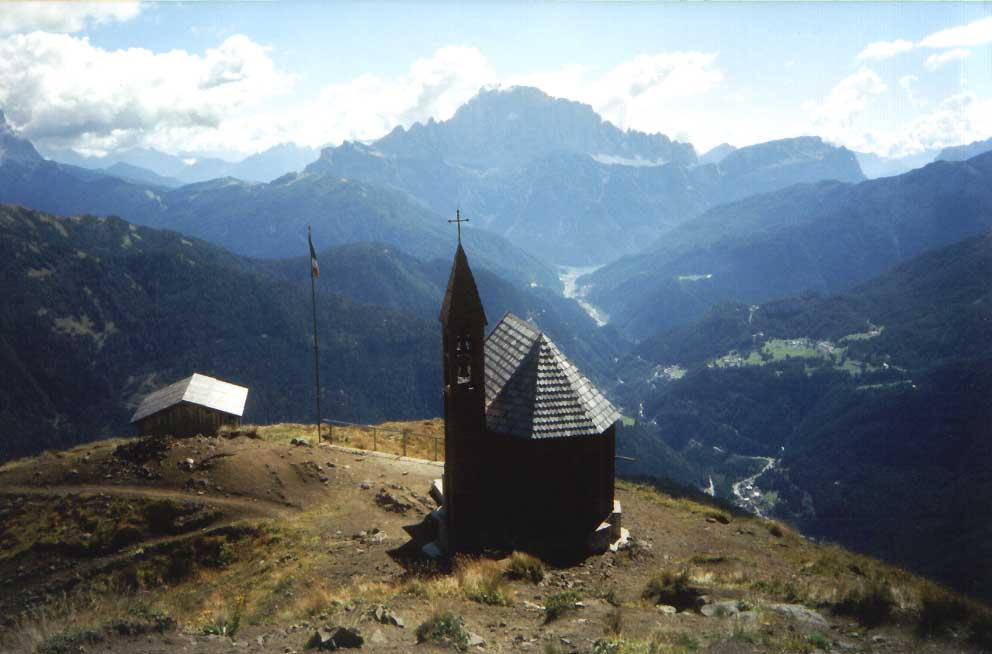
Chapel of Col di Lana

During the mobilization of August 1914, the 122nd Brigade (1st K.u.k. Feldjäger Regiment) and the 87th Infantry Brigade were grouped together, forming the 44th Landwehr Infantry Division, commanded by Heinrich Tschurtschenthaler. The division was part of the Austro-Hungarian XIV Corp, located on the Eastern Front in Galicia, in the area of modern-day Rava-Ruska. On 1 October Goiginger was appointed head of the 32nd Infantry Division, attached to the 2nd Army, commanded by General Eduard von Böhm-Ermolli. During winter 1914–1915, Goiginger was given command of the Goiginger group, consisting of a division and the 103rd Landsturm Brigade, which was engaged in the Battle of the Carpathians. In March 1915, he was assigned command of the 44th Landwehr Division, part of the XVIII Corps commanded by General Alfred von Ziegler. On 9 May 1915, Goiginger was promoted to Feldmarschall-Leutnant.

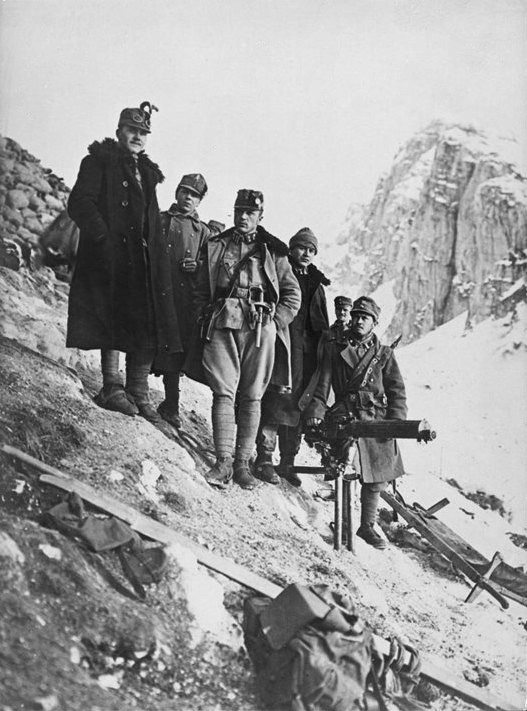
Austro-Hungarian soldiers in the Alps with a captured Maxim machine gun, c. 1916–1917.

After the Italian entry into World War I, Goiginger was sent to the Italian front, where on 5 June 1915, he received command of the Division Pustertal, in the Tyrol defense command's District V, commanded by General der Kavallerie Viktor Dankl von Krasnik. Goiginger was engaged in combat along the Dolomites, where on 17 April 1916, at the Col di Lana command sector, the explosion of a passage mined by Italian sappers engulfed a whole Kaiserjäger company.

At the end of August 1916, with Romania's entry into the war, Goiginger was sent to Transylvania. On 12 October 1916 he was assigned command of the 73rd Division, attached to the German 9th Army, led by General Konrad Krafft von Dellmensingen.

After successful fighting on the Romanian front, Goiginger returned to Italy. He was appointed command of the 60th Division, entrenched on Monte San Gabriele on the Isonzo. On 22 August 1917, during the Eleventh Battle of the Isonzo, Goiginger's spirited defense of Jelenik earned him the gold Medal for Bravery. During the Battle of Caporetto, the 60th Division, integrated into Armeegruppe Kosak, participated in the German-Austro-Hungarian rout of the Italian 2nd Army. On 8 March 1918, Goiginger was appointed to command the XXIV Corps, comprising the 55th and 60th Divisions, along with part of the 94th Division, which was located in the Monte Asolone area.

In June 1918, Goiginger's corps participated in the Second Battle of the Piave River, the Central Powers' last attempt to achieve victory on the Italian front. The corps occupied a bridgehead in Montello, where on 19 June it repulsed an Italian counter-attack, capturing 12,000 prisoners and 84 cannons. General Svetozar Boroević, the front's commander, believed he could utilize Montello's position as a base to prolong the Central Powers offensive. But Erich Ludendorff, head of the German General Staff, said that Germany was unable to allocate the resources necessary for further operations, having devoted all their reserves to the Western front. After consulting with Austro-Hungarian Chief of Staff Arthur Arz von Straußenburg, on 20 June Kaiser Karl I decided to abandon the offensive, ordering a withdrawal north of the Piave. Goiginger initially refused to surrender his hard won territory; after further orders, he accepted the decision. Austro-Hungarian units evacuated Montello, with the last troops withdrawing on 23 June, ending the battle. The command of this action earned Goiginger the Military Order of Maria Theresa.

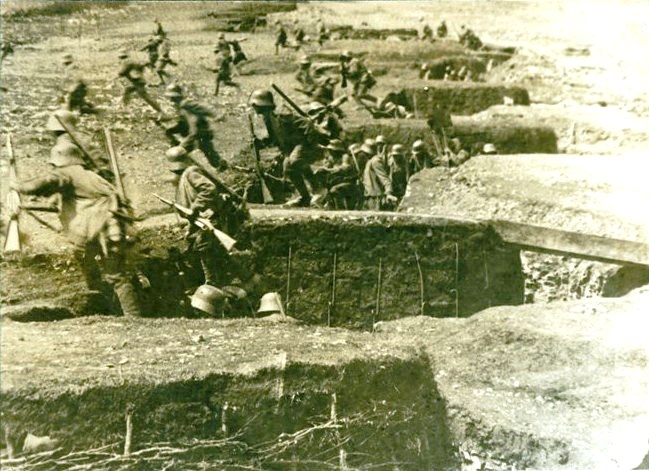
Austro-Hungarian troops assaulting the Isonzo, c. 1915–1917.

On 19 July, Goiginger was appointed the command of Austria-Hungary's formations on the Western front. The XVIII Corps, comprising the 1st, 35th, and 37th Divisions, along with the 16th Landsturm Division, was attached to Army Group Gallwitz. From October 1918 Goiginger was engaged along the Orne, suffering heavy losses to the American Expeditionary Forces. On 3 November, with the Armistice of Villa Giusti, Austria-Hungary withdrew from the conflict. The Austro-Hungarian corps in France was evacuated first to Arlon, then, on 10 November, towards Thionville. The last Austro-Hungarian troops left Germany on 29 November, and dispersed themselves amongst the states forming as a result of the breakup of the Habsburg monarchy.

=== Family and final years ===
Goiginger concluded his military career on 1 January 1919, in the Republic of German-Austria, and retired to Graz-Neustift, where he died in 1931. He was the younger brother of Feldzeugmeister Heinrich Goiginger (1861–1927).
