= Toblacher See =

Lake in Northern Italy

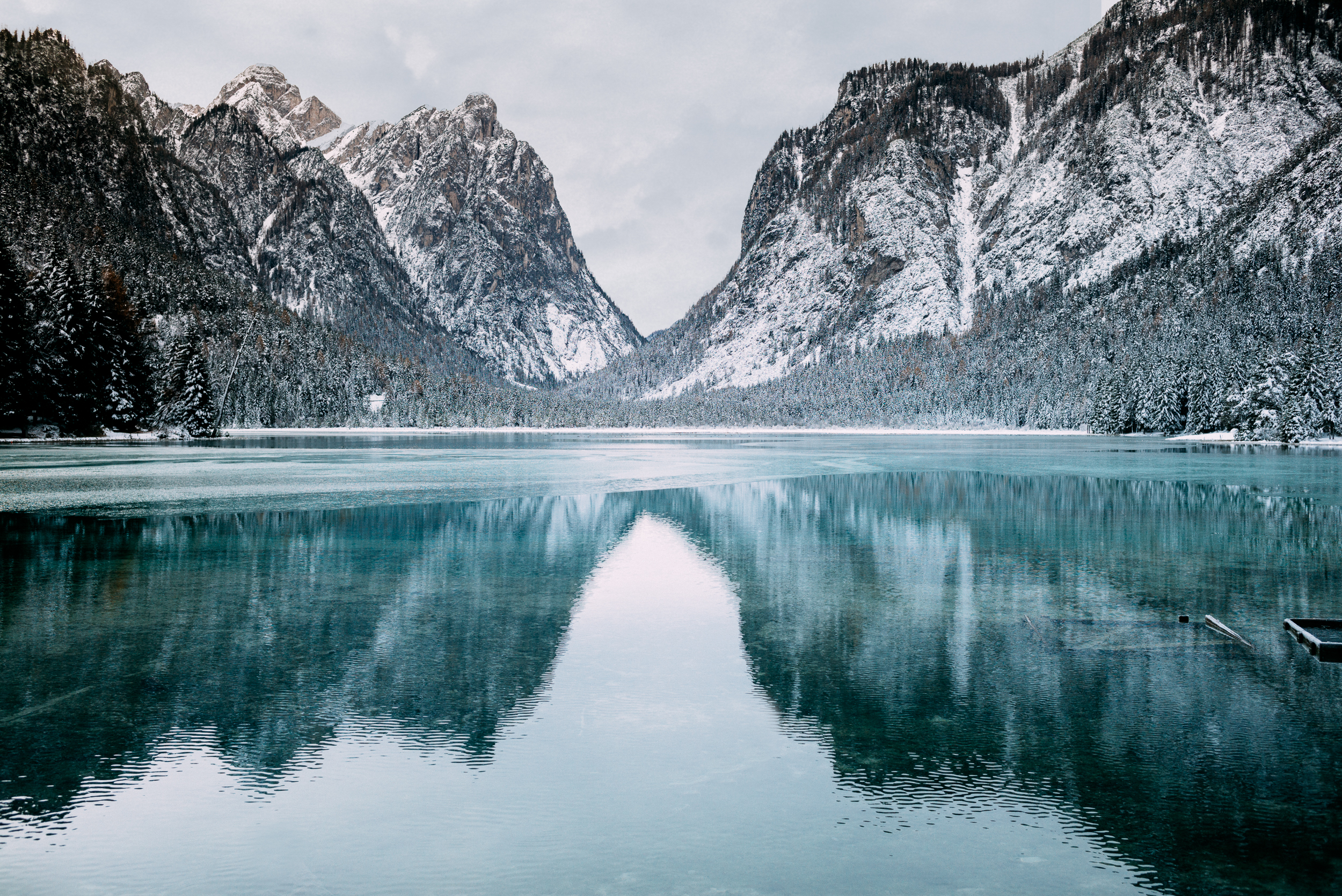

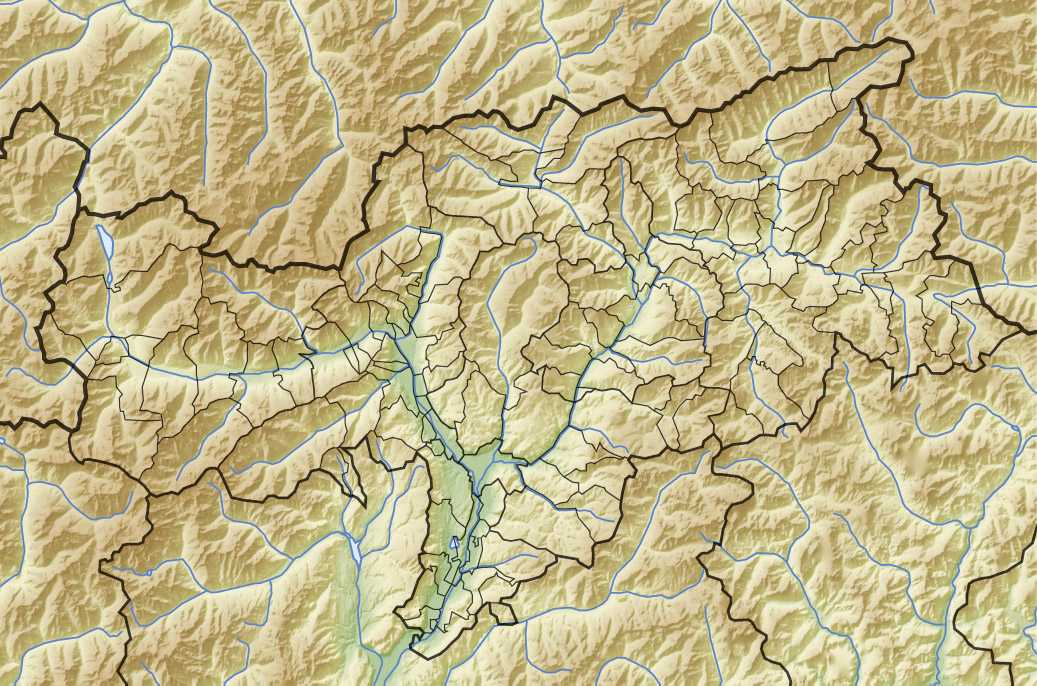
- Location within South Tyrol
- Location: South Tyrol
- Coordinates: 46°42′11″N 12°13′9″E
- Catchment area: 108.23 km^{2} (41.79 sq mi)
- Basin countries: Italy
- Surface area: 14.3 ha (35 acres)
- Max. depth: 3.5 m (11 ft)
- Water volume: 286,000 m^{3} (6.9×10^{−5} cu mi)
- Shore length^{1}: 4.5 km (3 mi)
- Surface elevation: 1,259 m (4,131 ft)
- Settlements: Toblach
- ^{1} Shore length is not a well-defined measure.

The Toblacher See (Italian: Lago di Dobbiaco; German: Toblacher See) is a lake in the municipality of Toblach in South Tyrol, Italy.
