= Piz Popena =

Mountain in the Dolomites

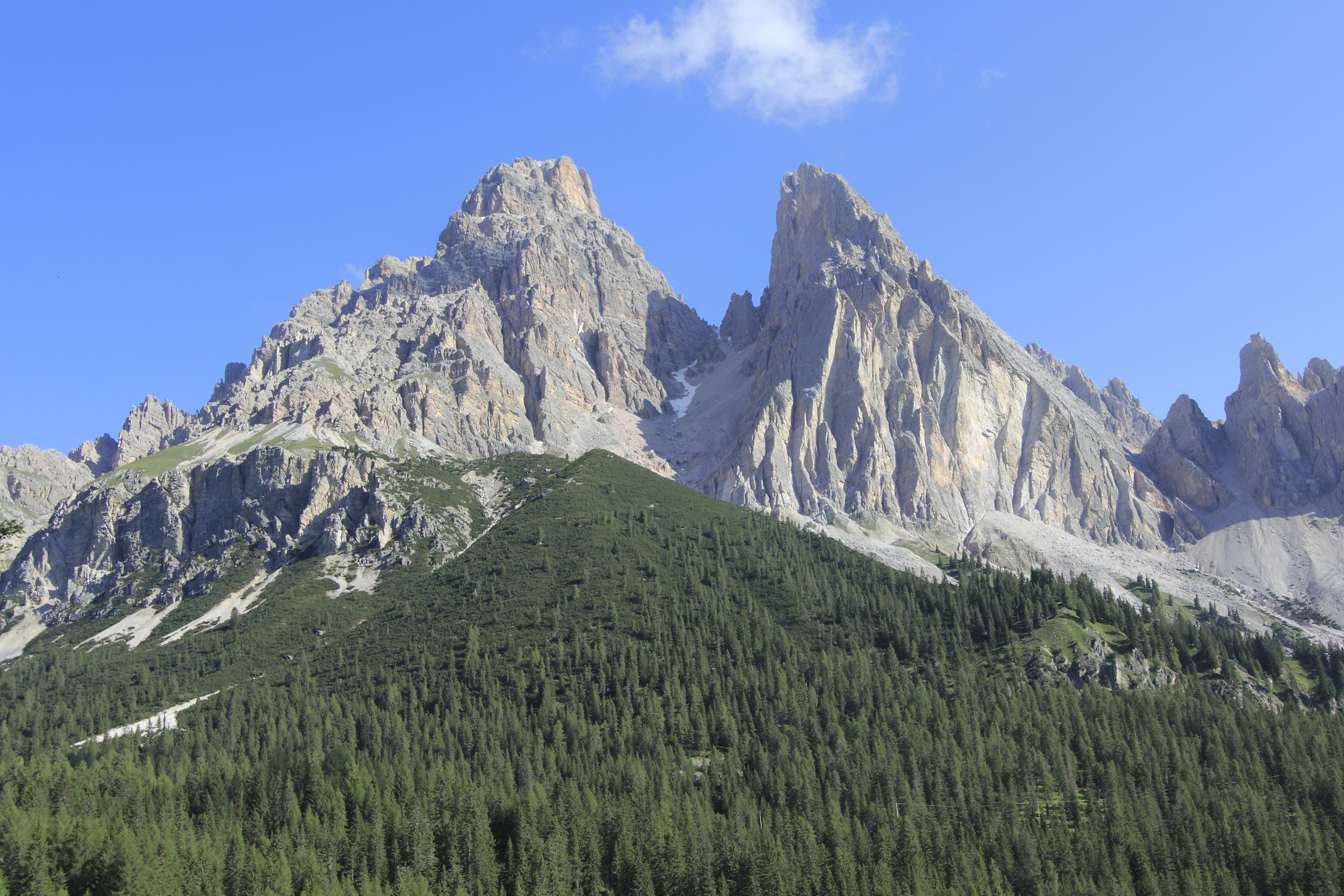
- South side of Piz Popena (on the right), with Monte Cristallo on its left.

Highest point
- Elevation: 3,152 m (10,341 ft)
- Isolation: 0.52 km (0.32 mi)
- Listing: Alpine mountains above 3000 m
- Coordinates: 46.576799°N 12.20782°E

Geography
- Location within Italy
- Location: Belluno, Italy
- Parent range: Dolomites

Climbing
- First ascent: 16 June 1870 (Santo Siorpaes, Christian Lauener, and Edwards Robson Whitwell)

The Piz Popena is a mountain in the Dolomites of Auronzo and Misurina, located in Veneto (province of Belluno). It culminates at 3,152 metres (10,341 ft), and belongs to the Cristallo group.

== Geography ==
The mountain is located north of Passo Tre Croci, east of Mount Cristallo, and west of Misurina.

== Notes ==
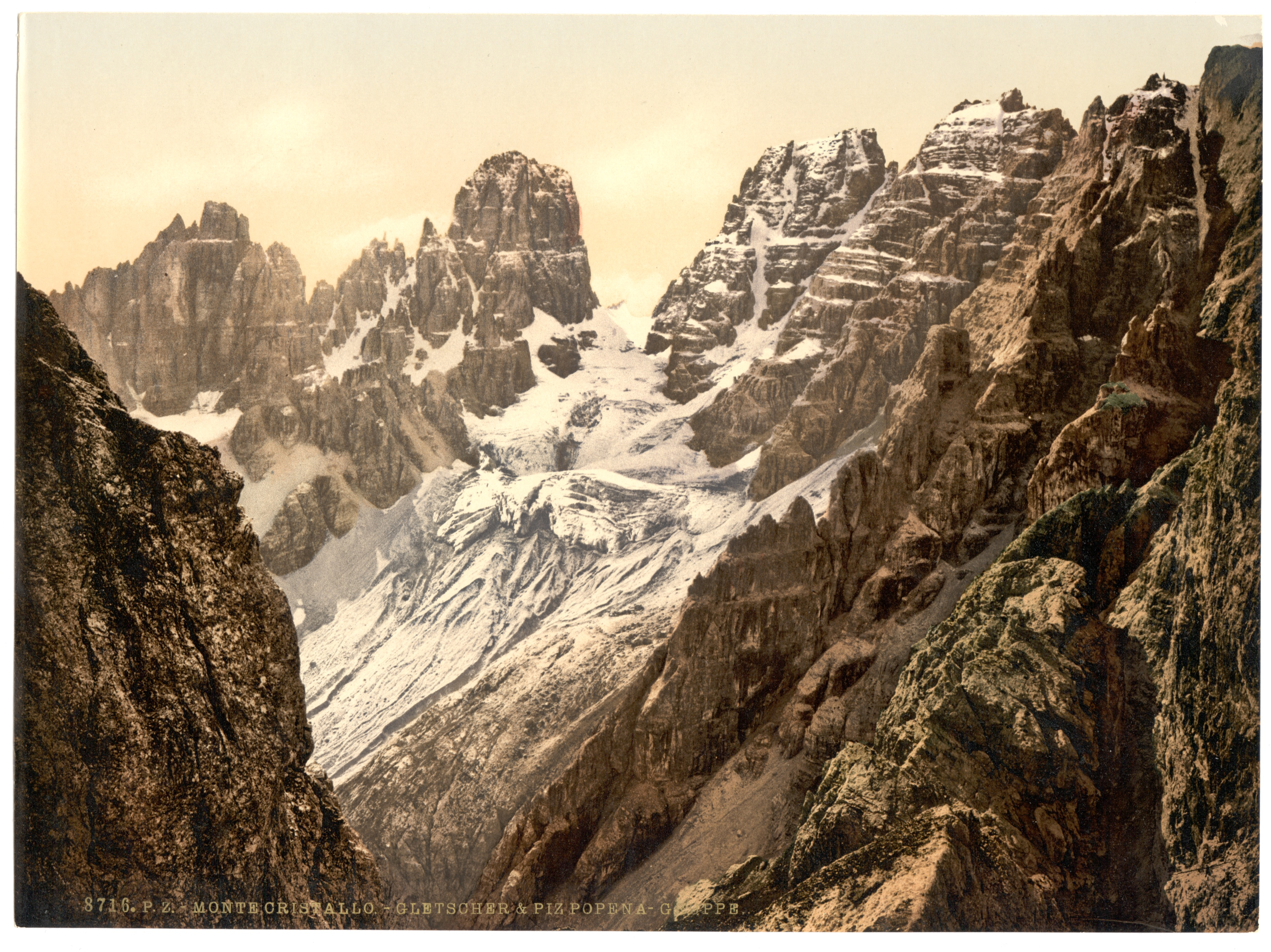
The glacier of the Piz Popena and Monte Cristallo group (before 1900).
