= Toblach =

- Comune
- Gemeinde Toblach; Comune di Dobbiaco
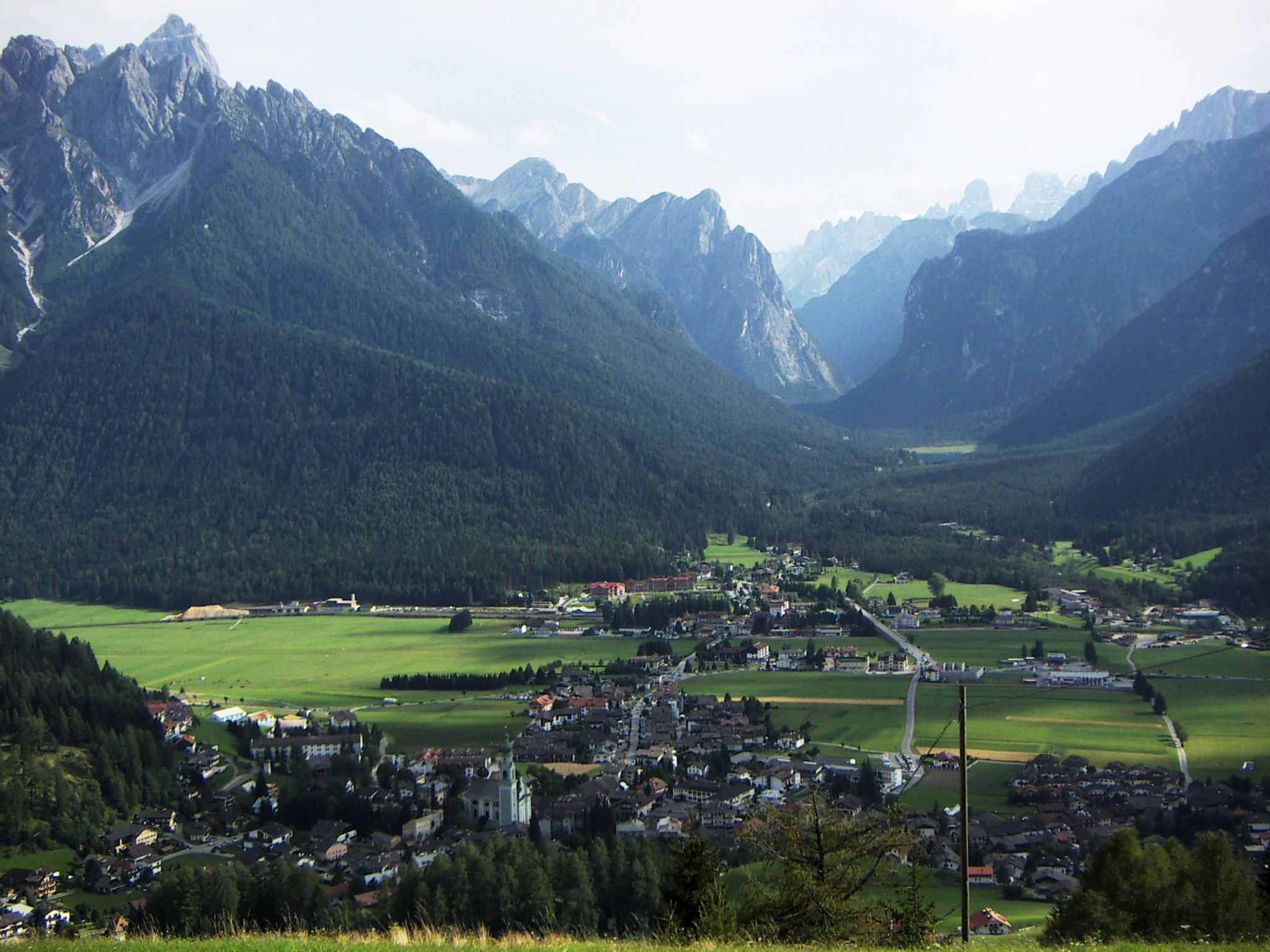
- View of Toblach

- Coat of arms

- Location within Italy Location within Trentino-Alto Adige/Südtirol
- Coordinates: 46°44′N 12°13′E
- Country: Italy
- Region: Trentino-Alto Adige/Südtirol
- Province: South Tyrol (BZ)
- Frazioni: Aufkirchen, Wahlen

Government
  - Mayor: Martin Rienzner

Area
  - Total: 126.6 km^{2} (48.9 sq mi)
- Elevation: 1,241 m (4,072 ft)

Population (Nov. 2010)
  - Total: 3,283
  - Density: 25.93/km^{2} (67.16/sq mi)
- Demonym(s): German: Toblacher or Toblinger; Italian: dobbiacensi
- Time zone: UTC+1 (CET)
  - Summer (DST): UTC+2 (CEST)
- Postal code: 39034
- Dialing code: 0474
- Saint day: May 28
- Website: Official website

Toblach (German: [ˈtoːblax]; Italian: Dobbiaco [dobˈbjaːko]) is a comune/Gemeinde (municipality) in South Tyrol in Northern Italy, located in the Puster Valley about 70 kilometres (43 mi) northeast of the city of Bolzano, on the border with Austria.

== Geography ==
As of November 30, 2010, it had a population of 3,283 and an area of 126.6 square kilometres (48.9 mi^{2}).

Toblach borders the following municipalities: Gsies, Innichen, Niederdorf, Prags, Auronzo di Cadore, Cortina d'Ampezzo and Innervillgraten (Austria).

The prominent mountain peaks the Tre Cime di Lavaredo (the Drei Zinnen in German) are located nearby. The Drava/Drau also flows from the nearby mountains; other rivers in the comune include the Rienz, which flows from the nearby Toblacher See.

=== Frazioni ===
The municipality of Toblach contains the frazioni (subdivisions, mainly villages and hamlets) Aufkirchen/Santa Maria and Wahlen/San Silvestro and the settlement of Schluderbach.

== History ==
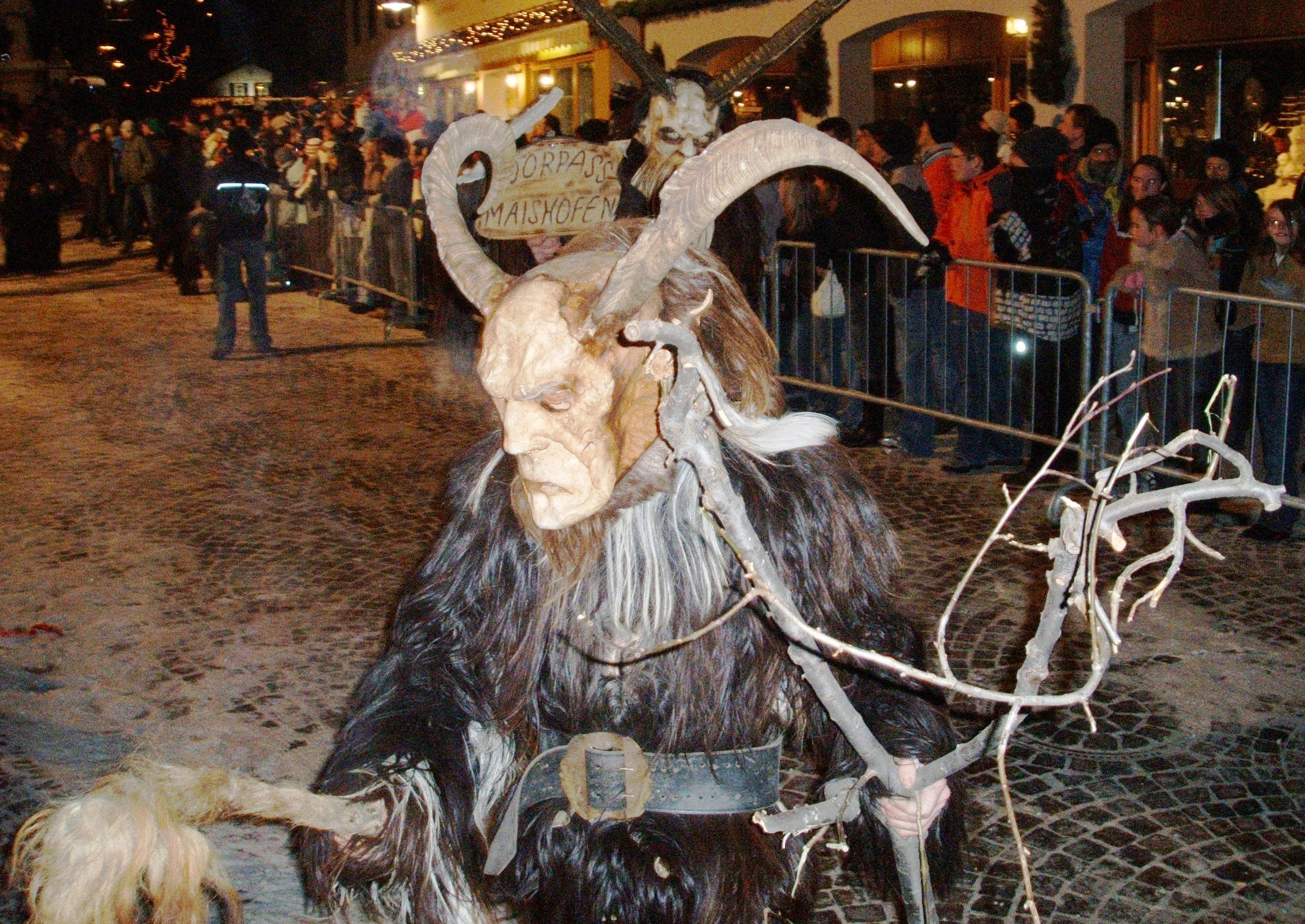
The krampus in Toblach

The locality is first being mentioned as in vico Duplago in a document issued by the bishopric of Freising as of 827.

=== Coat-of-arms ===
The escutcheon is divided vertically into two parts with a central circle, the colors are red and white alternating. It was the arms of the Lords of Herbstenburg who bought the castle in 1509 and ruled the village. The emblem was granted in 1967.

== Artists ==
Here, in a tiny wood cabin in the pine forests close to Toblach, in the summers of 1908–10 Gustav Mahler composed his ninth symphony, the last he completed, and Das Lied von der Erde, and also began work on his tenth symphony.

== Society ==
=== Linguistic distribution ===
In the 2024 census, 81.59% of the population declared that they belonged to the German-speaking community, 18.15% to the Italian and 0.26% to the Ladin.

=== Demographic evolution ===
Historical population

Year	Pop.	±%
1861	?	—
1871	?	—
1881	?	—
1901	?	—
1911	?	—

Year	Pop.	±%
1921	1,939	—
1931	2,123	+9.5%
1936	2,323	+9.4%
1951	2,470	+6.3%
1961	2,559	+3.6%

Year	Pop.	±%
1971	2,666	+4.2%
1981	2,845	+6.7%
1991	3,122	+9.7%
2001	3,240	+3.8%

Source: Data from ISTAT

== Climate ==
Climate data for Toblach/Dobbiaco (1991–2020)
Month	Jan	Feb	Mar	Apr	May	Jun	Jul	Aug	Sep	Oct	Nov	Dec	Year
Mean daily maximum °C (°F)	0.6 (33.1)	3.2 (37.8)	7.6 (45.7)	11.9 (53.4)	16.5 (61.7)	20.6 (69.1)	22.6 (72.7)	21.9 (71.4)	17.0 (62.6)	11.8 (53.2)	5.6 (42.1)	0.9 (33.6)	11.7 (53.0)
Daily mean °C (°F)	−3.8 (25.2)	−2.1 (28.2)	2.1 (35.8)	6.3 (43.3)	10.9 (51.6)	14.8 (58.6)	16.6 (61.9)	16.1 (61.0)	11.6 (52.9)	6.9 (44.4)	1.5 (34.7)	−3.1 (26.4)	6.5 (43.7)
Mean daily minimum °C (°F)	−7.7 (18.1)	−6.8 (19.8)	−2.8 (27.0)	0.8 (33.4)	5.2 (41.4)	9.1 (48.4)	10.9 (51.6)	10.7 (51.3)	6.6 (43.9)	2.8 (37.0)	−1.8 (28.8)	−6.5 (20.3)	1.7 (35.1)
Average precipitation mm (inches)	21.8 (0.86)	22.9 (0.90)	29.8 (1.17)	46.2 (1.82)	76.6 (3.02)	97.9 (3.85)	124.1 (4.89)	108.1 (4.26)	77.2 (3.04)	70.3 (2.77)	45.6 (1.80)	30.5 (1.20)	751.2 (29.57)
Average precipitation days (≥ 1.0 mm)	4.4	4.3	5.4	7.5	10.8	12.2	12.1	11.8	8	6.8	5.8	5.2	94.3
Average relative humidity (%)	73.4	66.4	63.3	64.2	65.2	64.3	63.9	66.3	68.7	72.5	75.5	75.5	68.3
Average dew point °C (°F)	−7.3 (18.9)	−7.3 (18.9)	−4.6 (23.7)	−0.8 (30.6)	4.0 (39.2)	7.5 (45.5)	9.3 (48.7)	10.0 (50.0)	6.4 (43.5)	2.9 (37.2)	−1.8 (28.8)	−6.3 (20.7)	1.0 (33.8)
Source: ncei.noaa.gov, (Precipitation and precipitation days for 1981-2010)

== Airport ==
Approximately 1 km to the South of Toblach lies Toblach Airport Italy's northernmost airport. The small military airfield has a 700-metre-long (2,300 ft) and 50-metre-wide (160 ft) grass runway and is managed by the Italian Air Force's Airport Detachment Toblach. From May to October the airport is open for civilian traffic on weekends and holidays.

== Sports ==
Toblach is a regular host of FIS Cross-Country World Cup events and has hosted several stages of the Tour de Ski, a cross-country skiing stage event.

== See also ==
- Dürrensee
