= Lake Misurina =

Lake in Belluno, Veneto, Italy

Lake Misurina Lago di Misurina
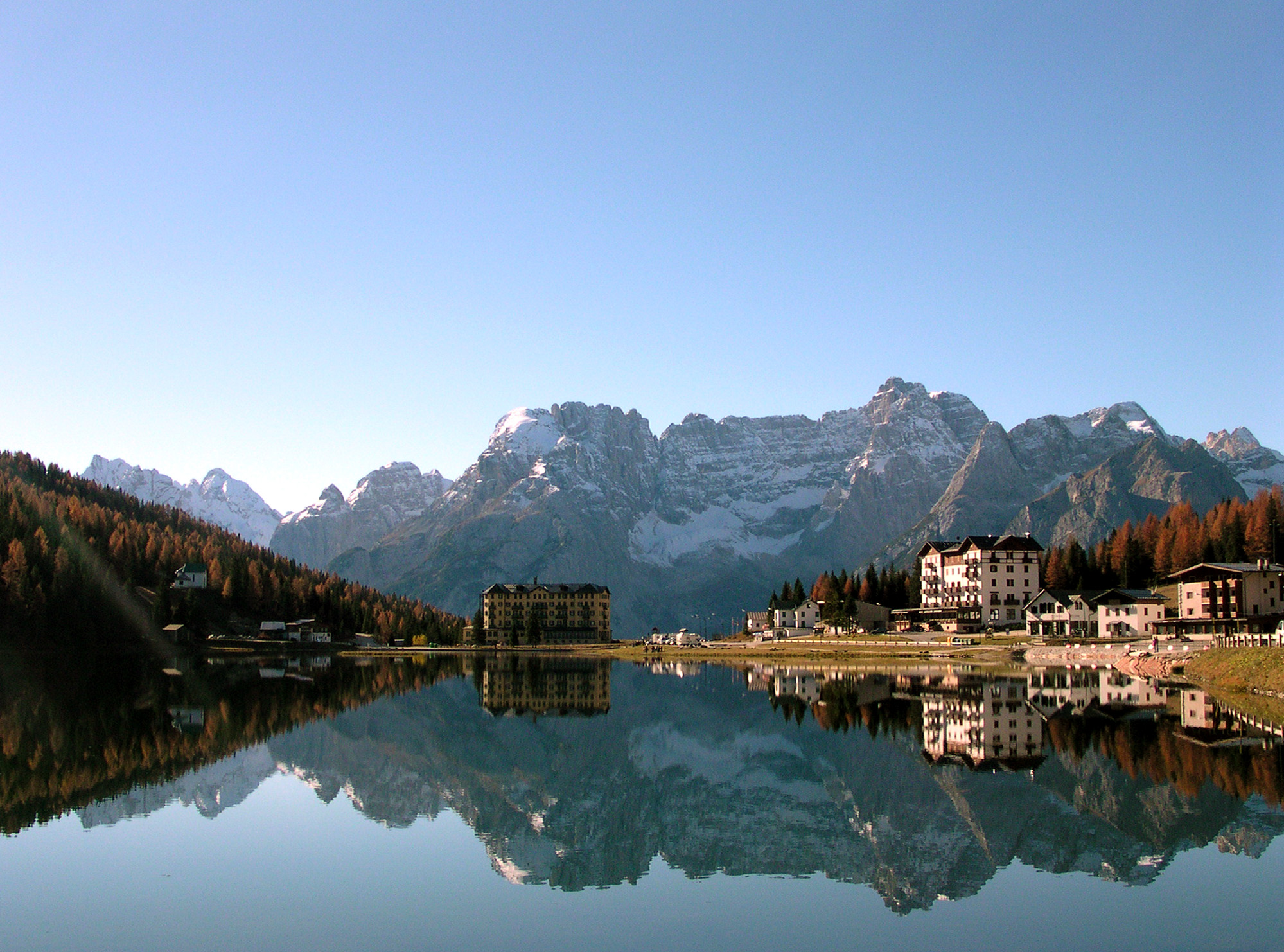
- at Auronzo di Cadore

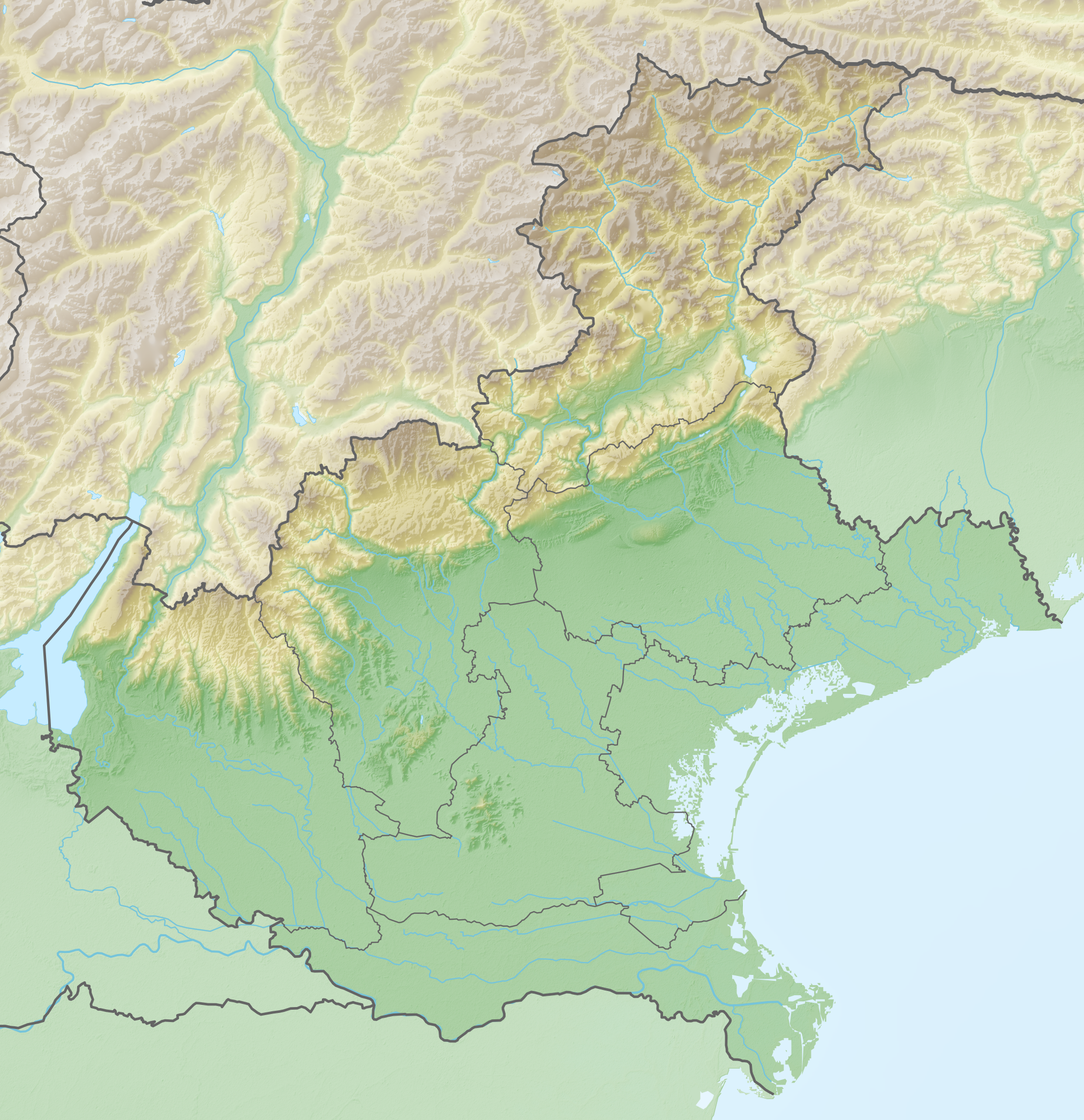
- Location within Italy Location within Veneto
- Location: Province of Belluno, Veneto
- Coordinates: 46°34′55″N 12°15′14″E
- Primary inflows: Ansiei
- Primary outflows: Ansiei
- Catchment area: 15 ha (37 acres)
- Basin countries: Italy
- Max. depth: 5 m (16 ft)
- Surface elevation: 1,754 m (5,755 ft)

Lake Misurina (Italian: Lago di Misurina; Cadorino dialect: Lago de Meśorìna) is the largest natural lake of the Cadore. it sits 1,754 m above sea level, near Auronzo di Cadore (Belluno). The lake's perimeter is 2.6 km long, while the maximum depth is 5 m.

Near the lake some ten hotels accommodate around 500 guests.

The climatic characteristics around the lake make particularly good air for people with respiratory diseases. Near the lake is the only center in Italy for the care of childhood asthma, housed in the Grand Hotel Misurina.

The lake was the theme of a song by Claudio Baglioni. Lake Misurina is the theme of the theatrical representation of the Longane di Lozzo.

Lake Misurina hosted the speed skating events during the 1956 Winter Olympics of Cortina d'Ampezzo – the last time Olympic speed skating events were held on natural ice.

Misurina lies on the route of the Dolomites Gold Cup Race.

== Legend ==
At least two legends are associated with Lake Misurina. Popularized by a song named "Il lago di Misurina" by Claudio Baglioni, Misurina is a little capricious and spiteful girl who lives literally held in the palm of the hand of her gigantic father, king Sorapiss. He is transformed into a mountain to fulfill another desire and obtain for her the magic mirror from the Queen of Monte Cristallo. During the last stages of the transformation he sees his daughter fall and his tears flow like rivers and form the lake beneath which his daughter will forever live with the magic mirror.

In the other legend, Mesurina (who is later nicknamed) is a daughter of wealthy merchants from Venice who is sent to the mountains by her father who is anxious not to fulfill a prophecy that would see the girl give away all their possessions. Following some tragic amorous events reminiscent of Romeo and Juliet, the girl dies, and she is recognized on the point of death by a lover from whom she was brought away by deception from the stables of his father and a servant sent by him.

== See also ==
- List of lakes in Italy § Alphabetical
