= Dürrensee =

Lake in the Dolomites, Italy

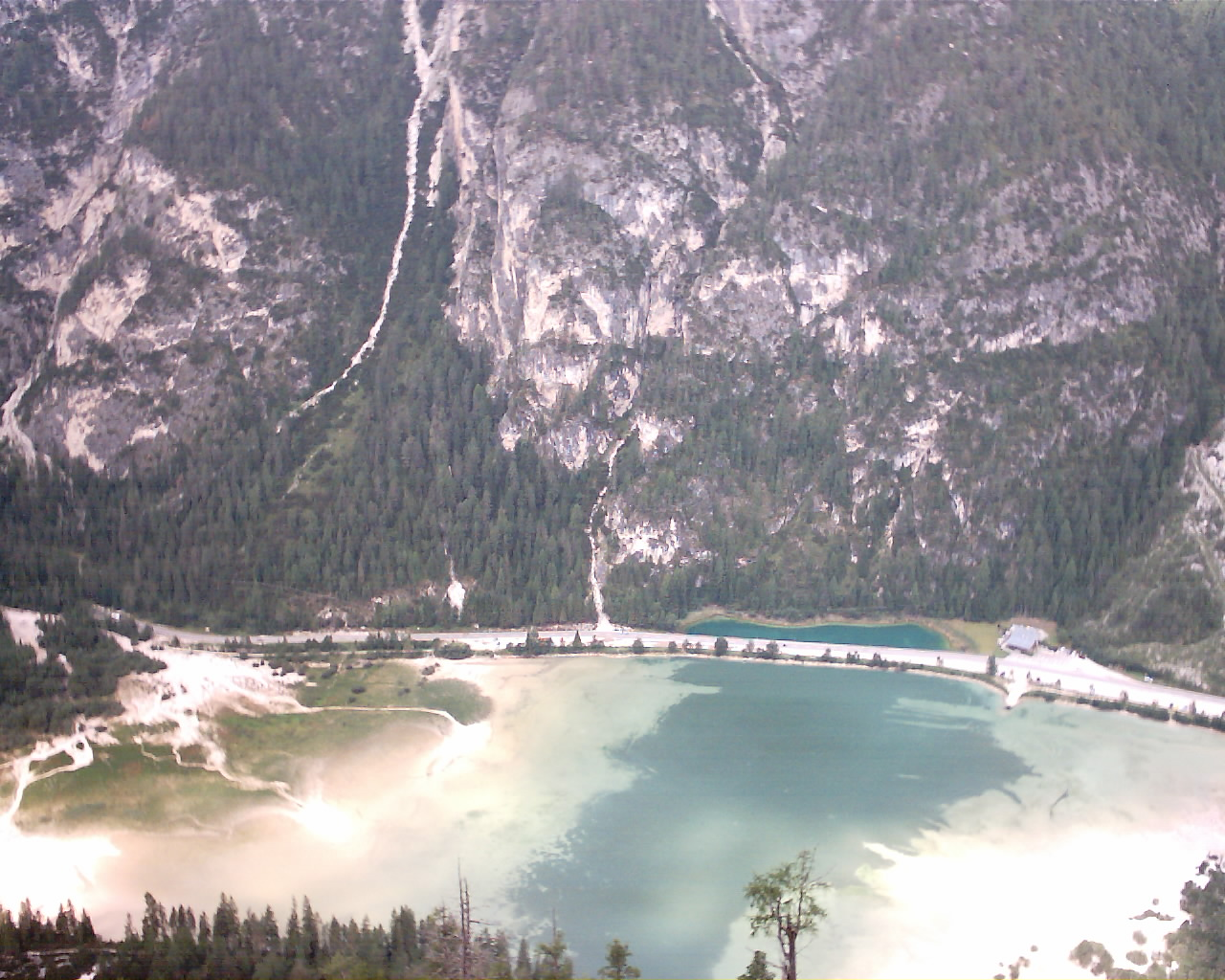

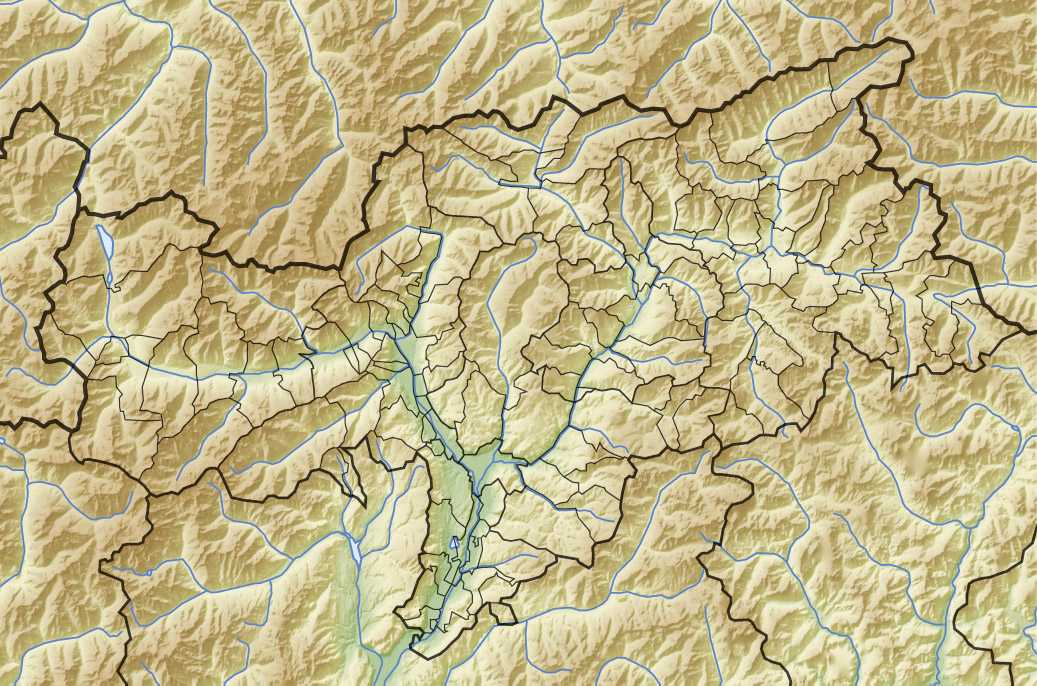
- Location within South Tyrol Location within Italy Location within Alps
- Location: Dolomites (South Tyrol)
- Coordinates: 46°37′48″N 12°13′55″E
- Basin countries: Italy
- Surface elevation: 1,400 m (4,600 ft)

The Dürrensee (Italian: Lago di Landro; German: Dürrensee) is a lake in the Dolomites in South Tyrol, Italy.
