= Siorpaes =

Siorpaes is an Italian surname. Notable people with the surname include:

- Gildo Siorpaes (born 1938), Italian bobsledder
- Giovanni Siorpaes (1869–1909), Italian mountaineer
- Patrizia Siorpaes, Italian alpine skier
- Santo Siorpaes (1832–1900), Italian mountaineer
- Sergio Siorpaes (born 1934), Italian bobsledder
- Wendy Siorpaes (born 1985), Italian alpine skier

== See also ==
- Torre Siorpaes, a summit in northern Italy
