= Cima Cadin della Neve =

Mountain in Italy

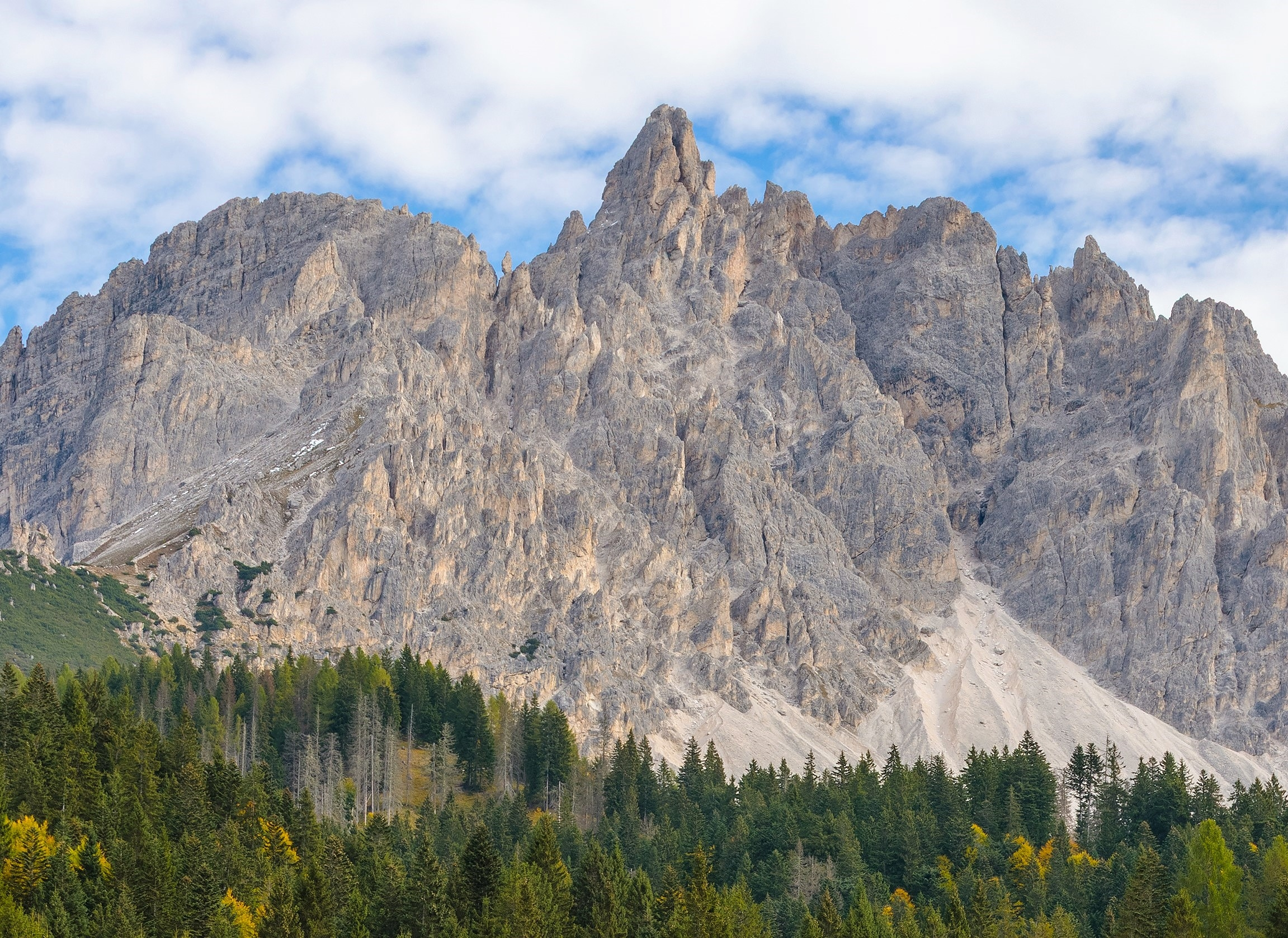
- South aspect

Highest point
- Elevation: 2,757 m (9,045 ft)
- Prominence: 288 m (945 ft)
- Parent peak: Cima Cadin di San Lucano
- Isolation: 0.642 km (0.399 mi)
- Coordinates: 46°34′23″N 12°16′45″E

Geography
- Location within Italy Location within Alps
- Country: Italy
- Province: Belluno
- Protected area: Drei Zinnen / Tre Cime Nature Park
- Parent range: Dolomites; Cadini di Misurina
- Topo map: Tabacco 03 Ampezzo Dolomites

Geology
- Rock age: Triassic
- Rock type: Dolomite

Cima Cadin della Neve is a summit in the Province of Belluno in northern Italy.

== Description ==
Cima Cadin della Neve is a 2,757-meter-elevation (9,045-foot) summit, the fourth-highest point of the Cadini di Misurina in the Dolomites, a UNESCO World Heritage Site. Set in the Veneto region, the peak is located 11 kilometers (6.8 miles) east-northeast of the town of Cortina d'Ampezzo, and the peak is set in Drei Zinnen / Tre Cime Nature Park. Precipitation runoff from the peak's slopes drains into tributaries of the Ansiei River, which in turn is a tributary of the Piave. Topographic relief is significant as the summit rises 1,000 meters (3,281 feet) above Lake Misurina in two kilometers (1.24 miles). The nearest higher neighbor is Cima Eotvos, 0.64 kilometer (0.4 mile) to the east-northeast. The mountain's toponym translates as "Cadin Peak of the Snow," wherein "cadin" derives from Cadorino dialect of the Ladin language and means a bowl-shaped valley such as a cirque.

== Climate ==
Based on the Köppen climate classification, Cima Cadin della Neve is located in an alpine climate zone with long, cold winters, and short, mild summers. Weather systems are forced upwards by the mountains (orographic lift), causing moisture to drop in the form of rain and snow. The months of June through September offer the most favorable weather for visiting or climbing in this area.

== Gallery ==
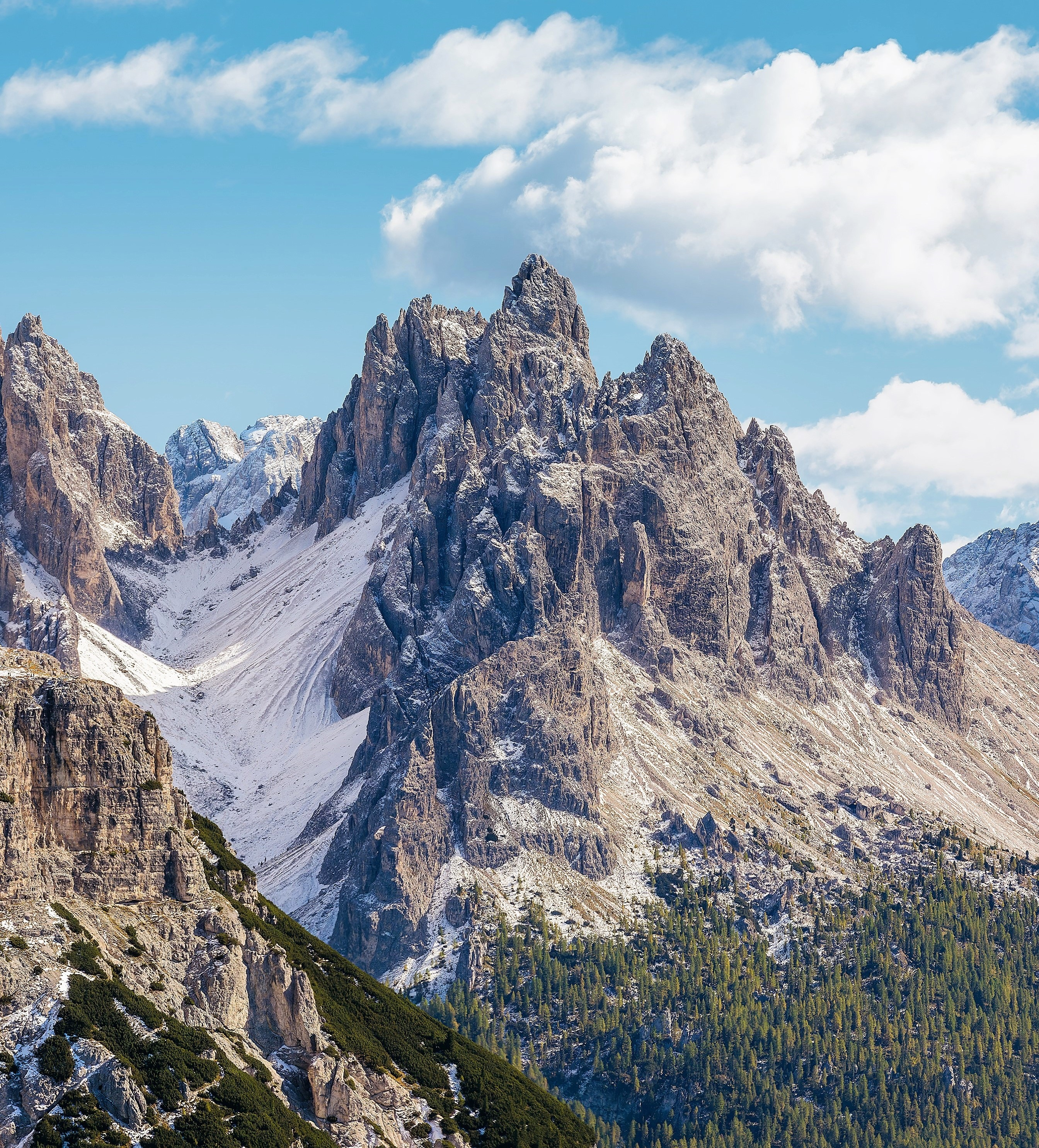
Northeast aspect

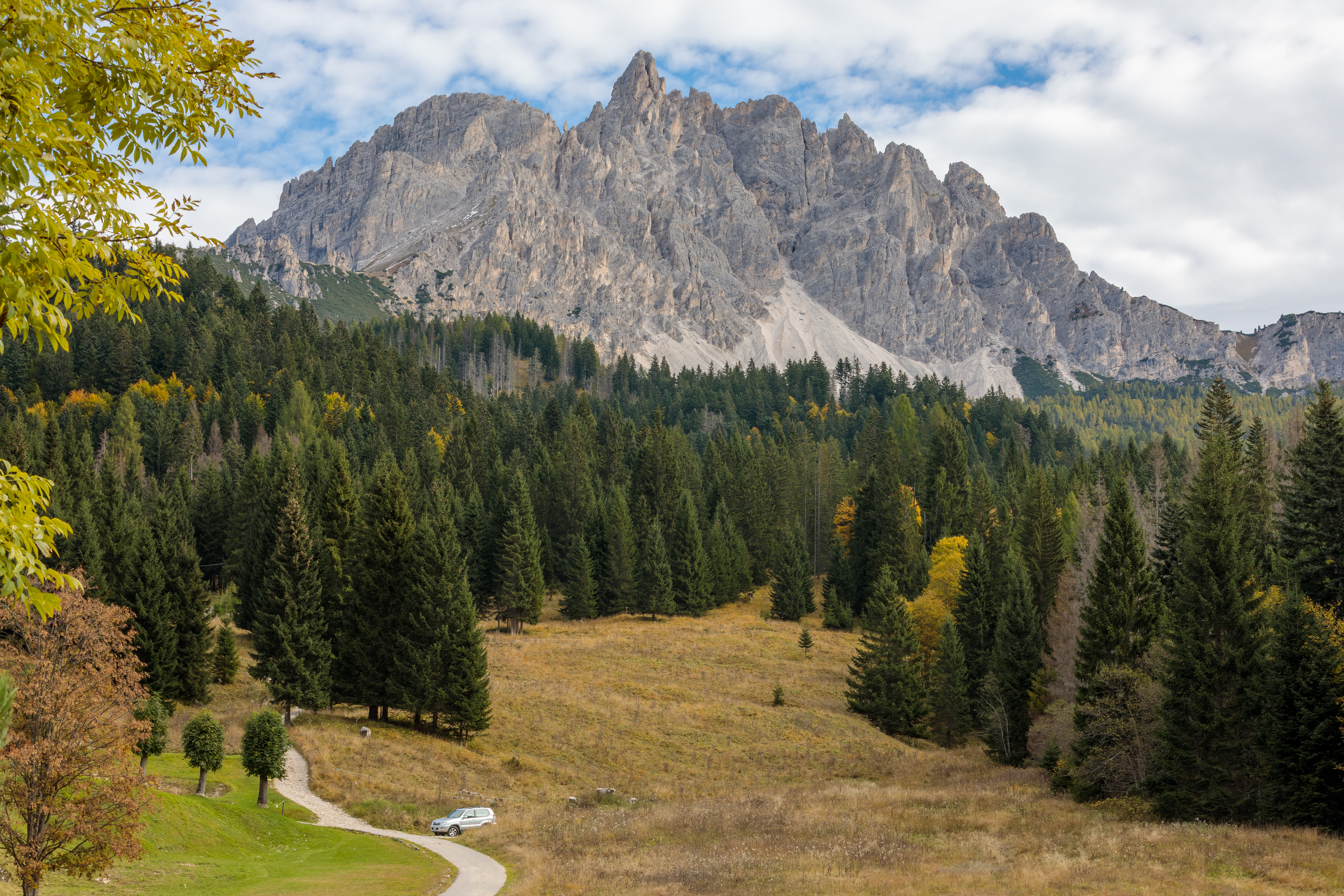
South aspect

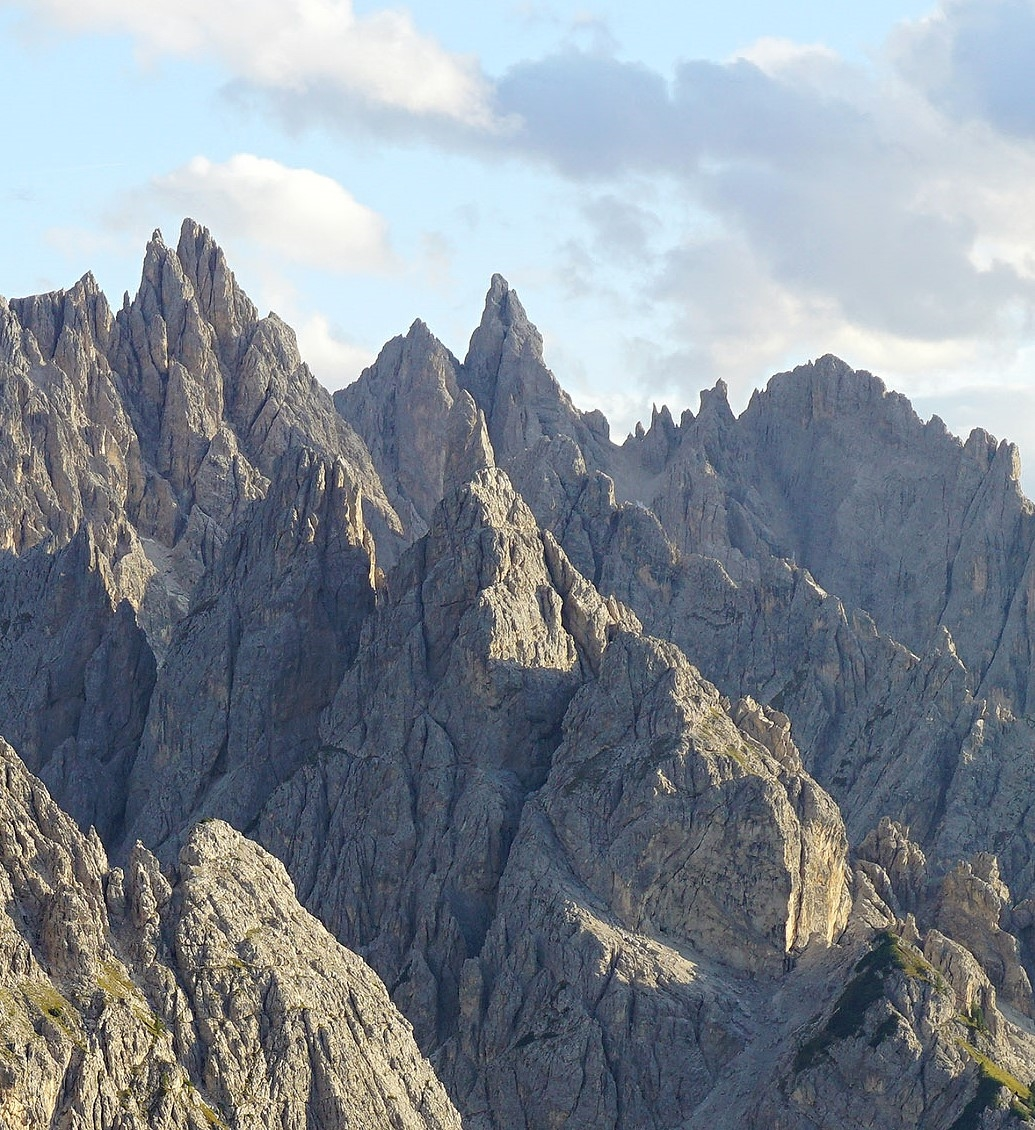
North aspect of Cima Cadin della Neve centered on skyline

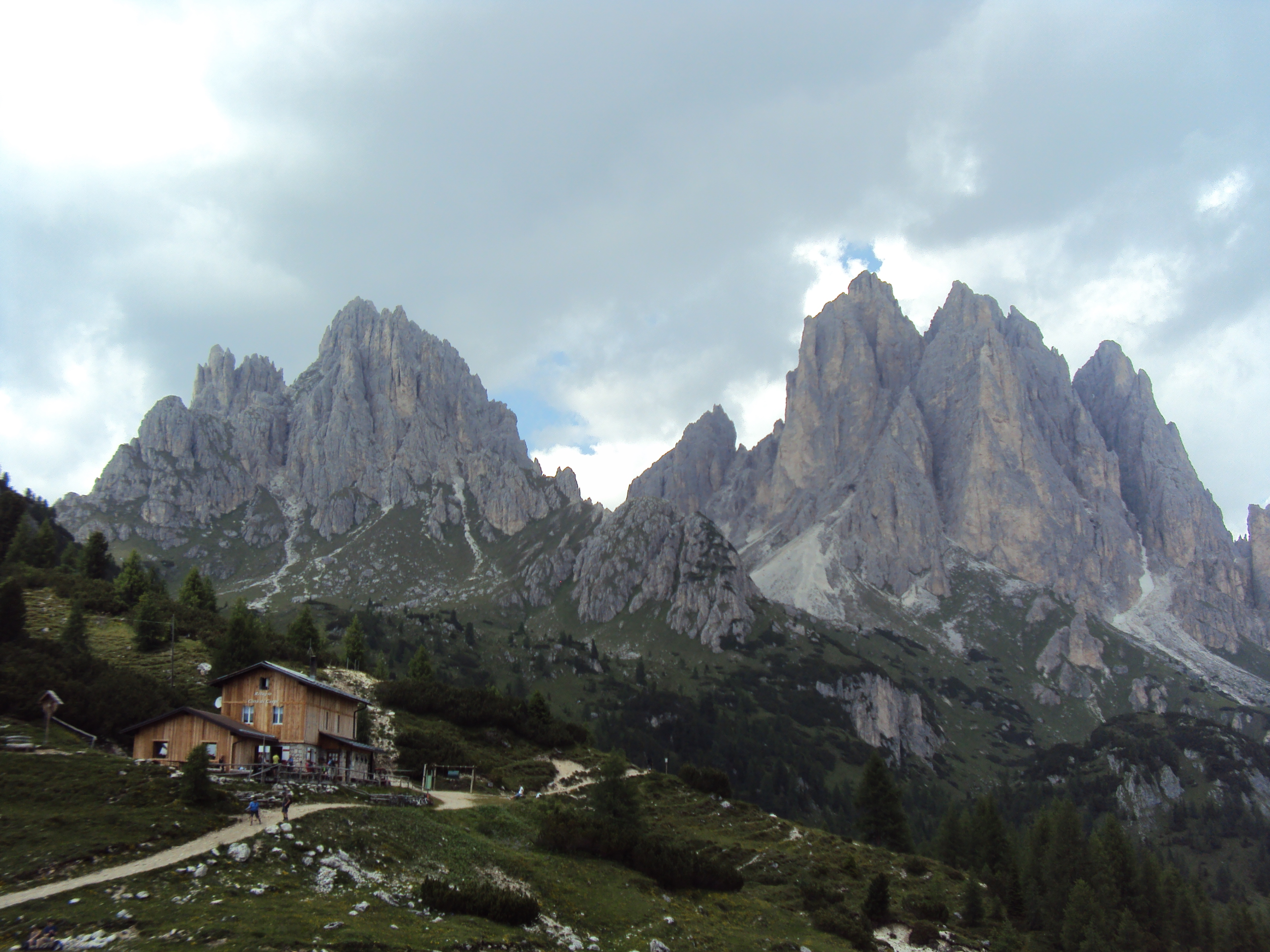
Cima Cadin della Neve (left) from southeast, with Rifugio Città di Carpi

== See also ==
- Southern Limestone Alps
