= Cima Cadin di San Lucano =

Mountain in Italy

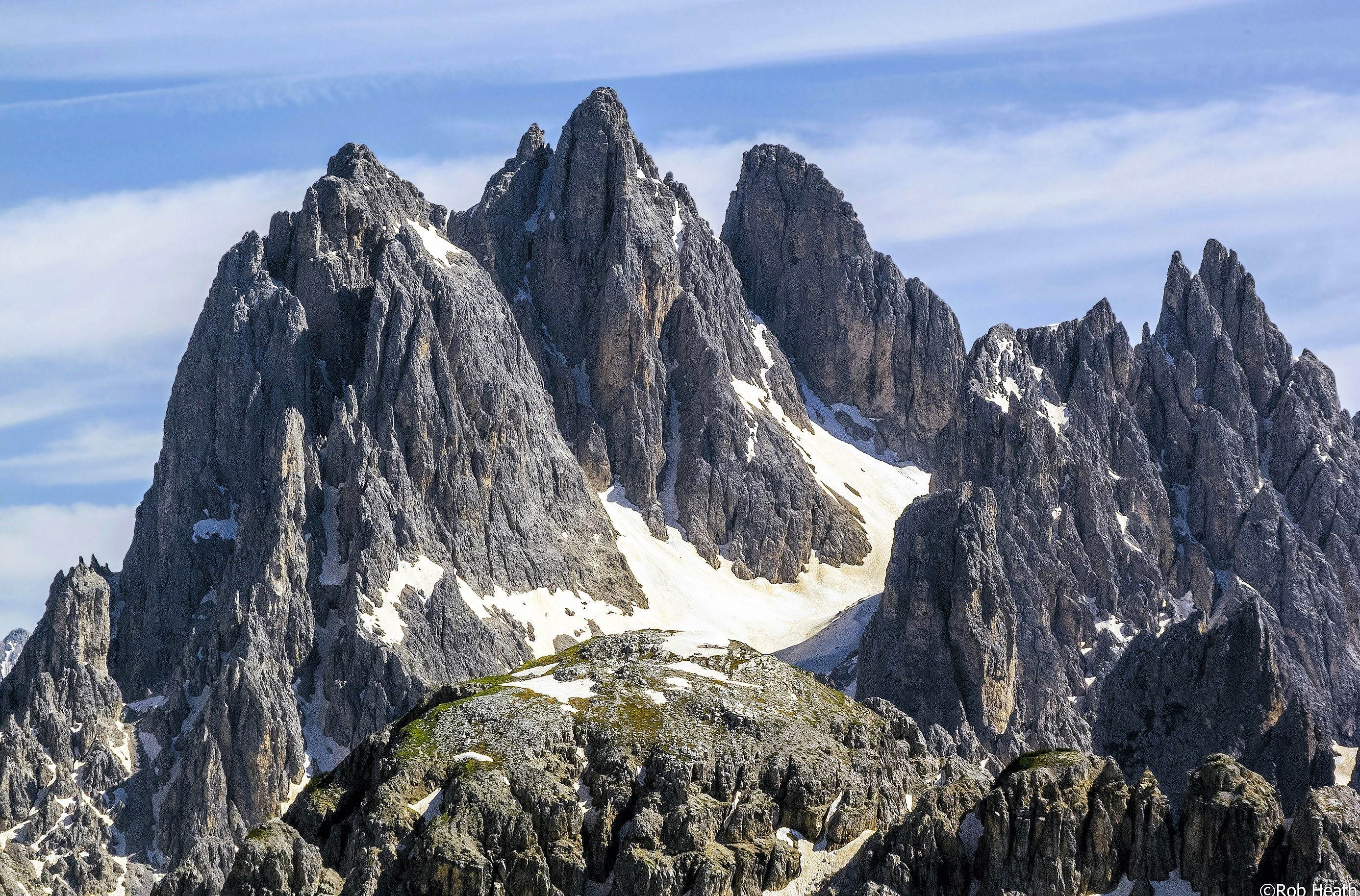
- North aspect

Highest point
- Elevation: 2,839 m (9,314 ft)
- Prominence: 669 m (2,195 ft)
- Parent peak: Dreischusterspitze
- Isolation: 4.5 km (2.8 mi)
- Coordinates: 46°34′40″N 12°17′18″E

Geography
- Location within Italy
- Country: Italy
- Province: Belluno
- Protected area: Drei Zinnen / Tre Cime Nature Park
- Parent range: Dolomites; Cadini di Misurina
- Topo map: Tabacco 03 Ampezzo Dolomites

Geology
- Rock age: Triassic
- Rock type: Dolomite

Climbing
- First ascent: 1870

Cima Cadin di San Lucano is a summit in the Province of Belluno in northern Italy.

== Description ==
Cima Cadin di San Lucano is a 2,839-meter-elevation (9,314-foot) summit, the highest point of the Cadini di Misurina in the Dolomites, a UNESCO World Heritage Site. Set in the Veneto region, the peak is located 12 kilometers (7.45 miles) west of the town of Auronzo di Cadore, and the peak is set in Drei Zinnen / Tre Cime Nature Park. Precipitation runoff from the peak's slopes drains into tributaries of the Ansiei River, which in turn is a tributary of the Piave. Topographic relief is significant as the summit rises 1,040 meters (3,412 feet) along the east slope in one kilometer (0.6 mile), and 1,090 meters (3,576 feet) above Lake Misurina in 2.5 kilometers (1.55 miles). The first documented ascent of the summit was accomplished in 1870 by Luigi Orsolina and Georg Ploner, while Santo Siorpaes and Albert Wachtler also made the ascent that same year. The mountain's toponym translates as "Peak of the Cadin of Saint Lucanus," wherein "cadin" derives from Cadorino dialect of the Ladin language and means a bowl-shaped valley such as a cirque. The nearest higher neighbor is Croda degli Alpini, 4.5 kilometers (2.8 miles) to the north-northeast.

== Climate ==
Based on the Köppen climate classification, Cima Cadin di San Lucano is located in an alpine climate zone with long, cold winters, and short, mild summers. Weather systems are forced upwards by the mountains (orographic lift), causing moisture to drop in the form of rain and snow. The months of June through September offer the most favorable weather for visiting or climbing in this area.

== Gallery ==
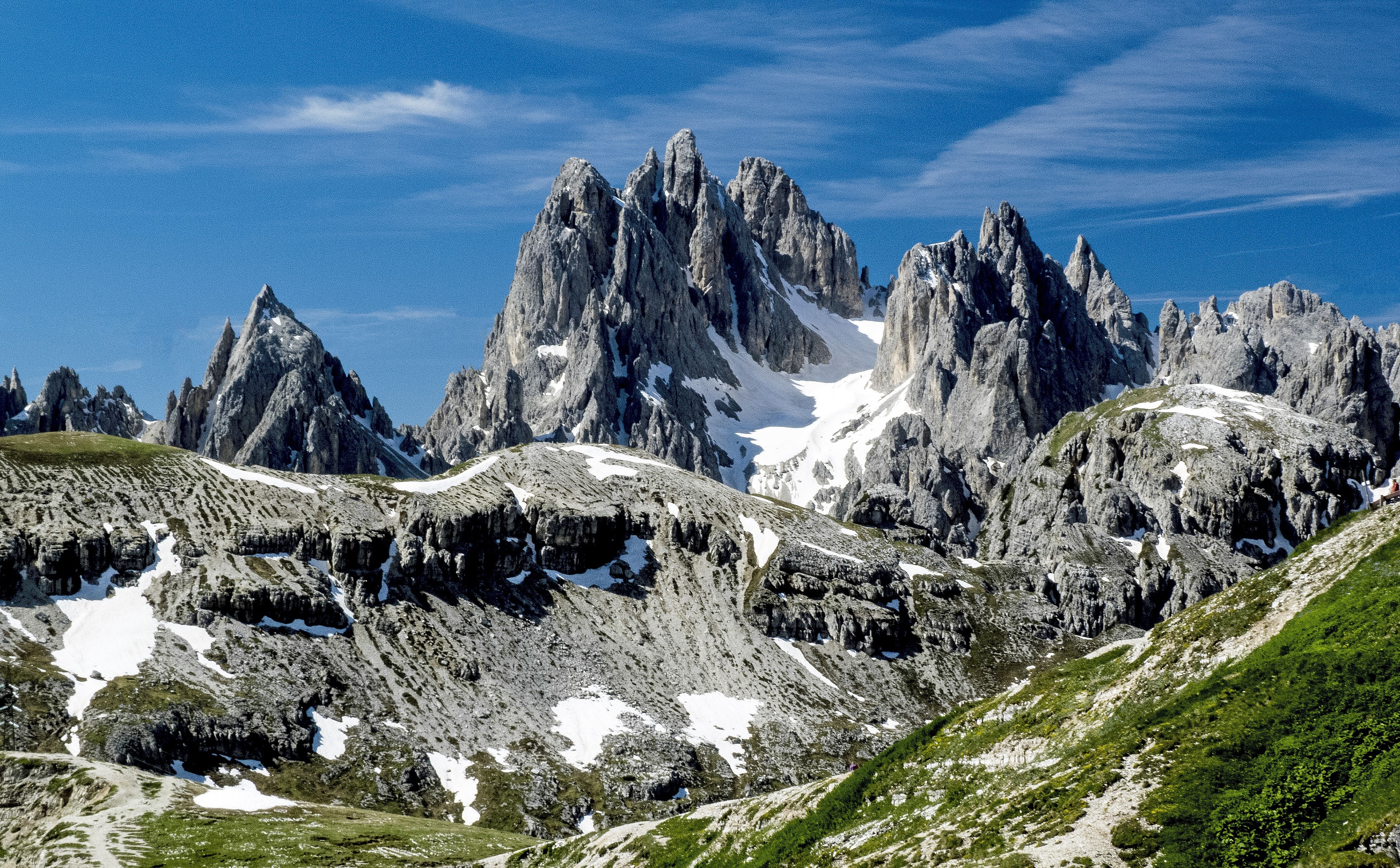
North aspect

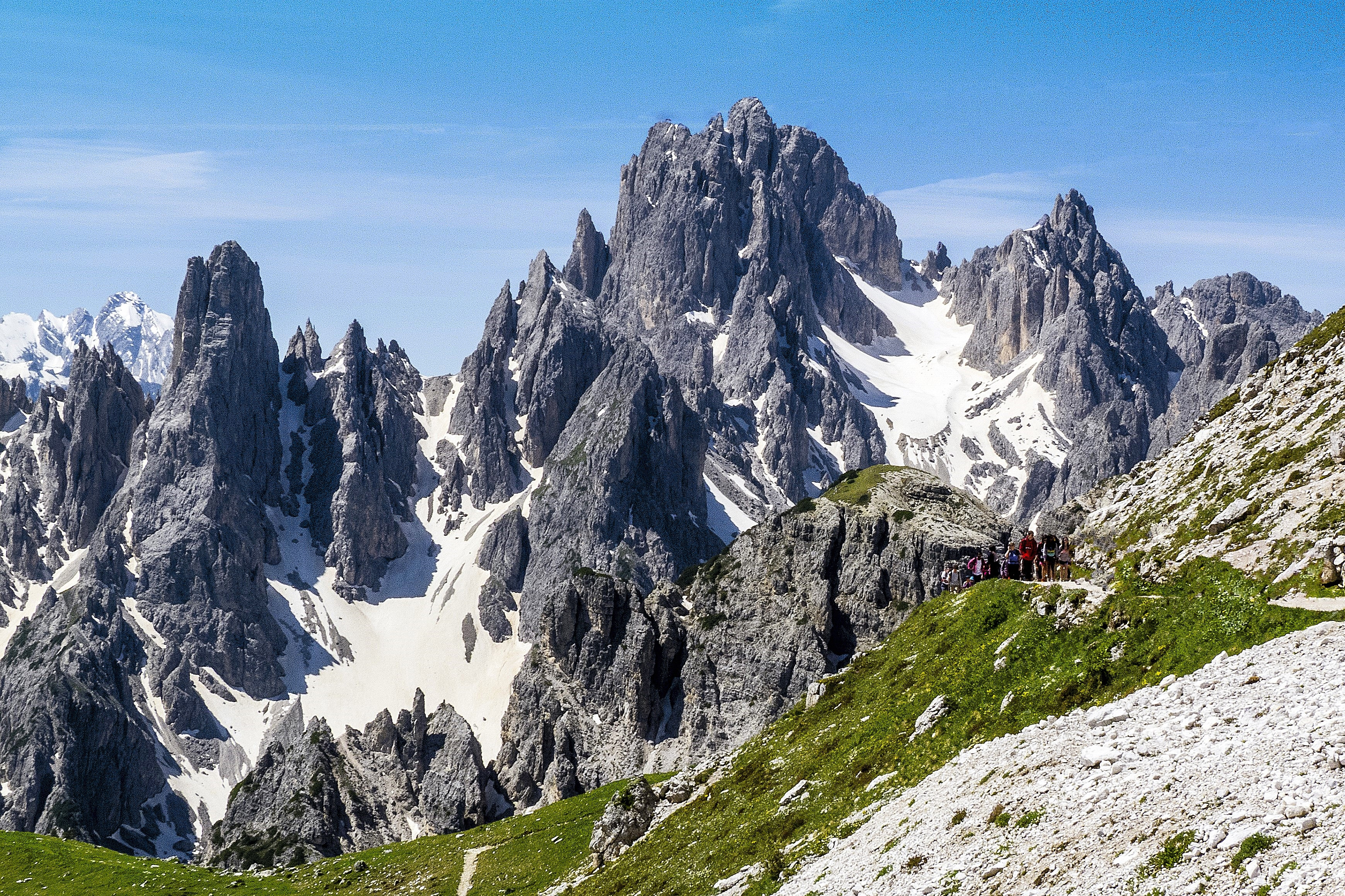
North aspect of Cima Cadin di San Lucano centered, with Torre Siorpaes to left

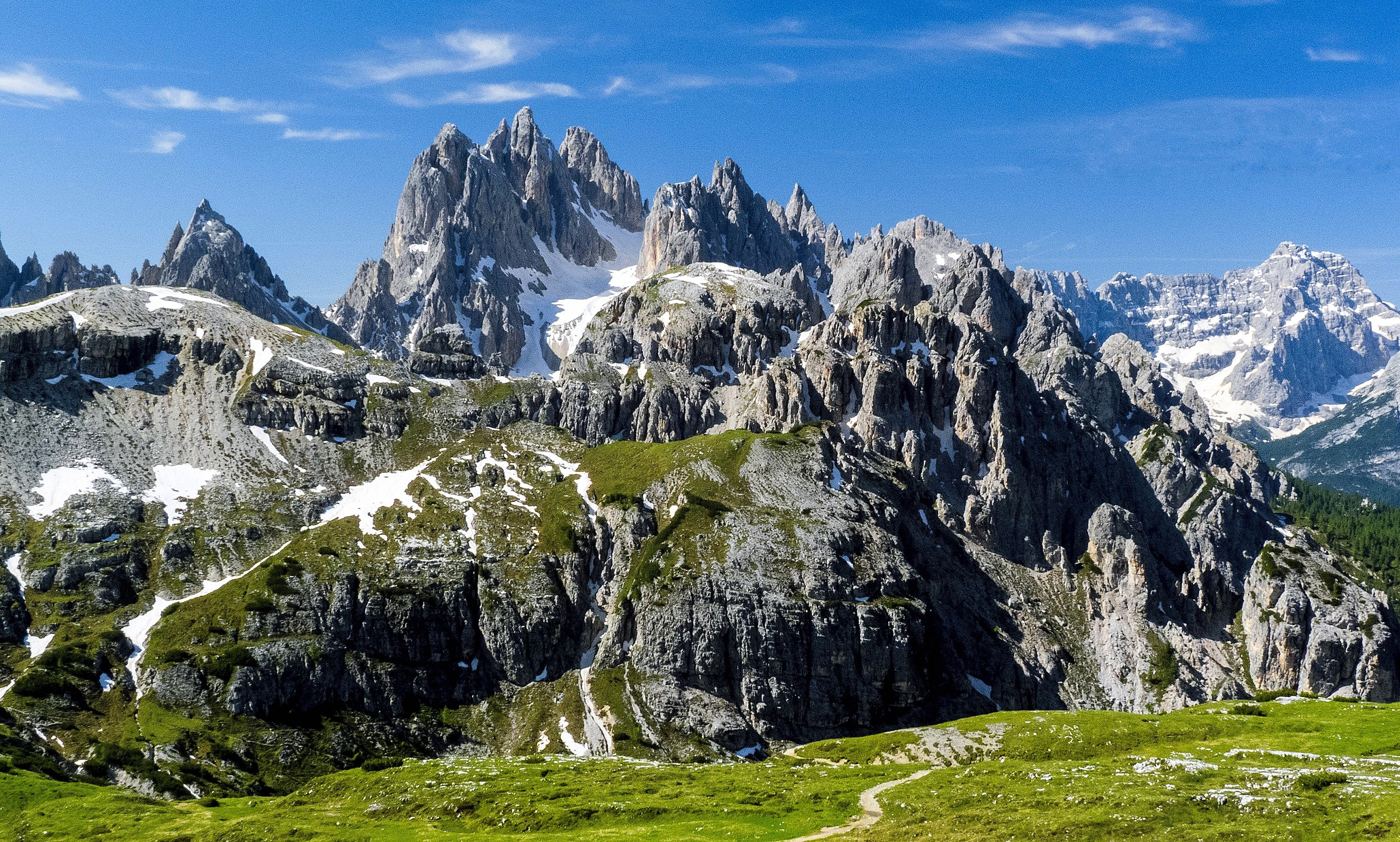
Cima Cadin di San Lucano left of center

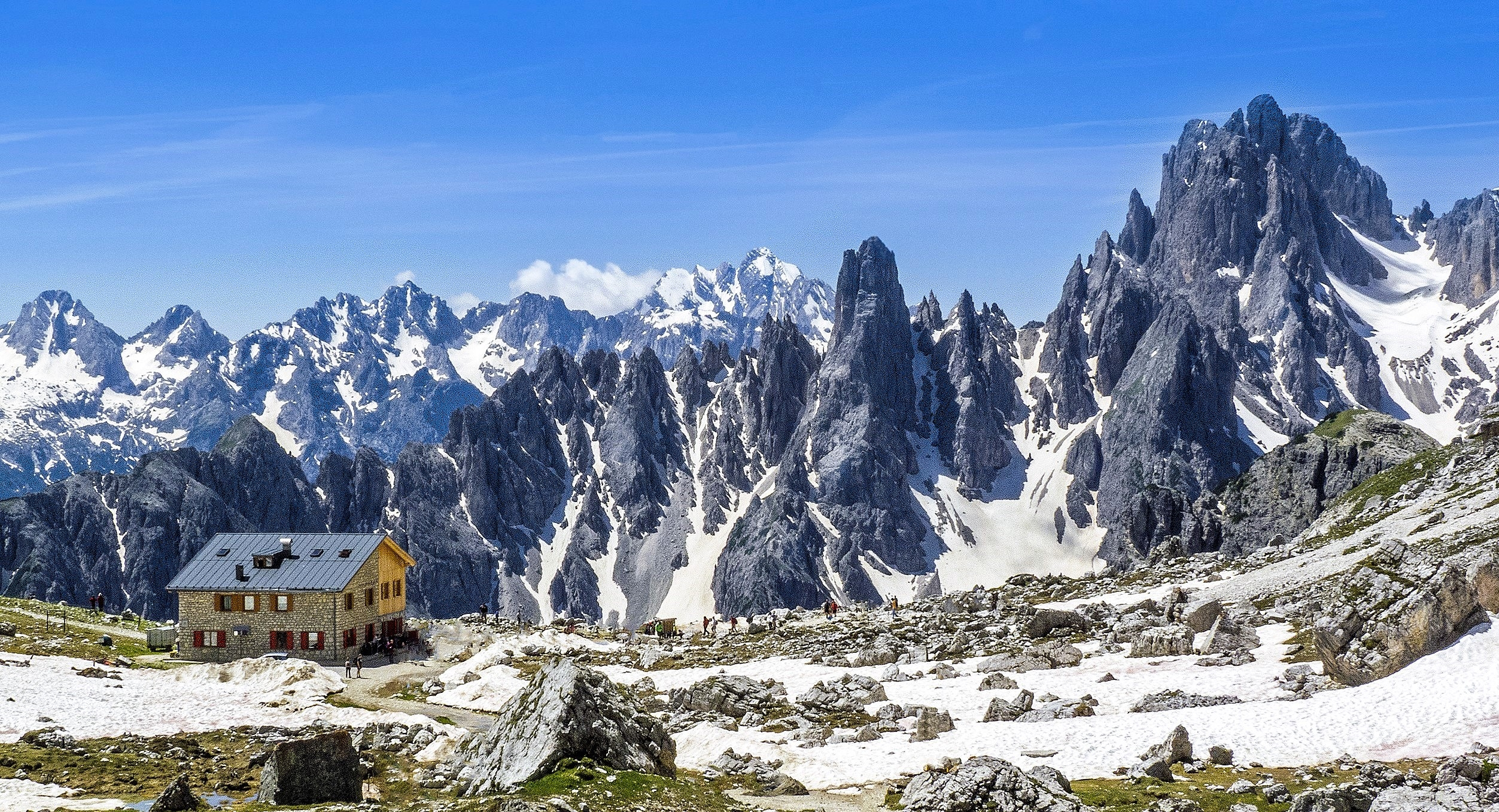
Cima Cadin di San Lucano (right) and Rifugio Lavaredo (left)

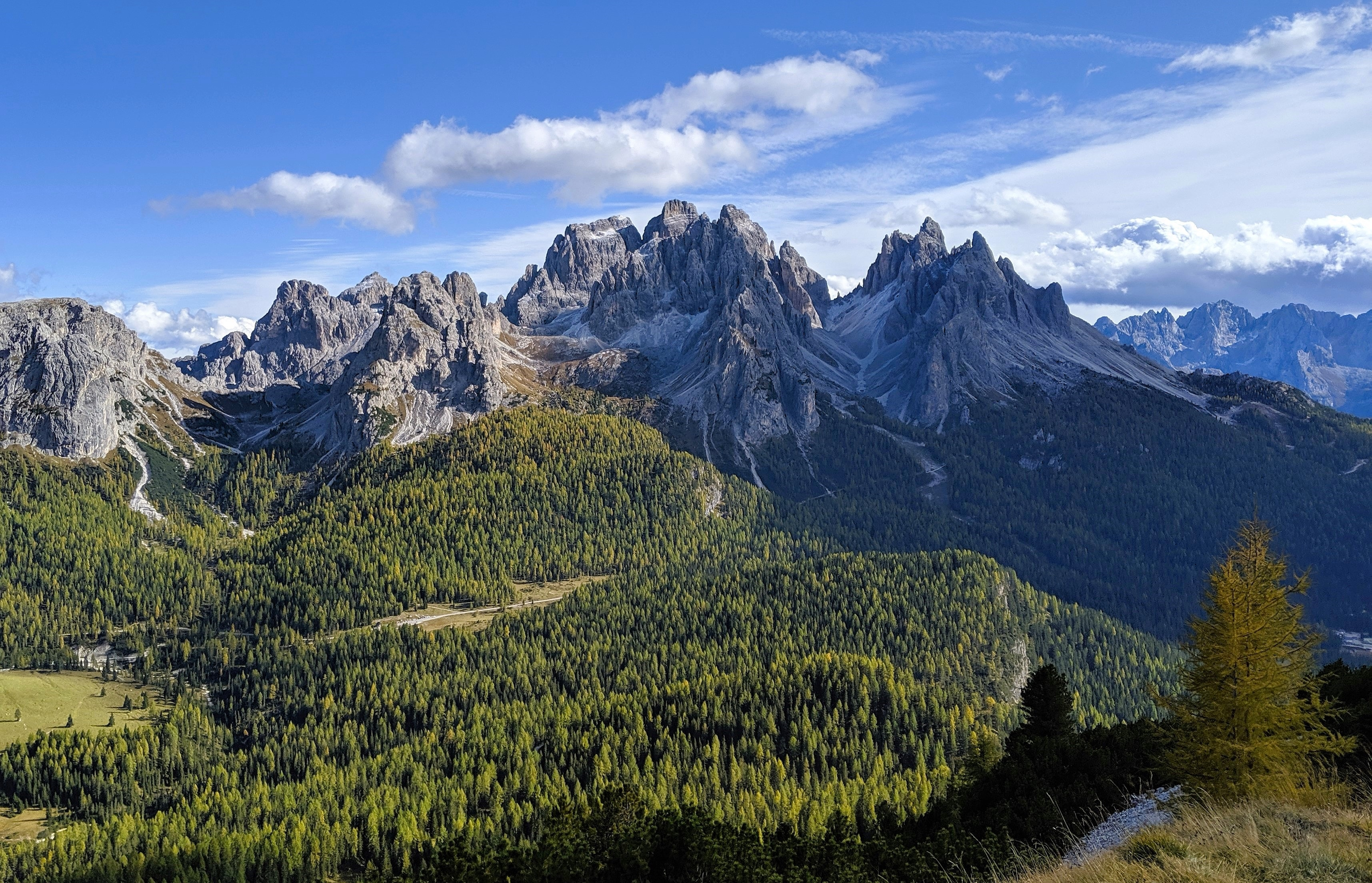
From north-northest

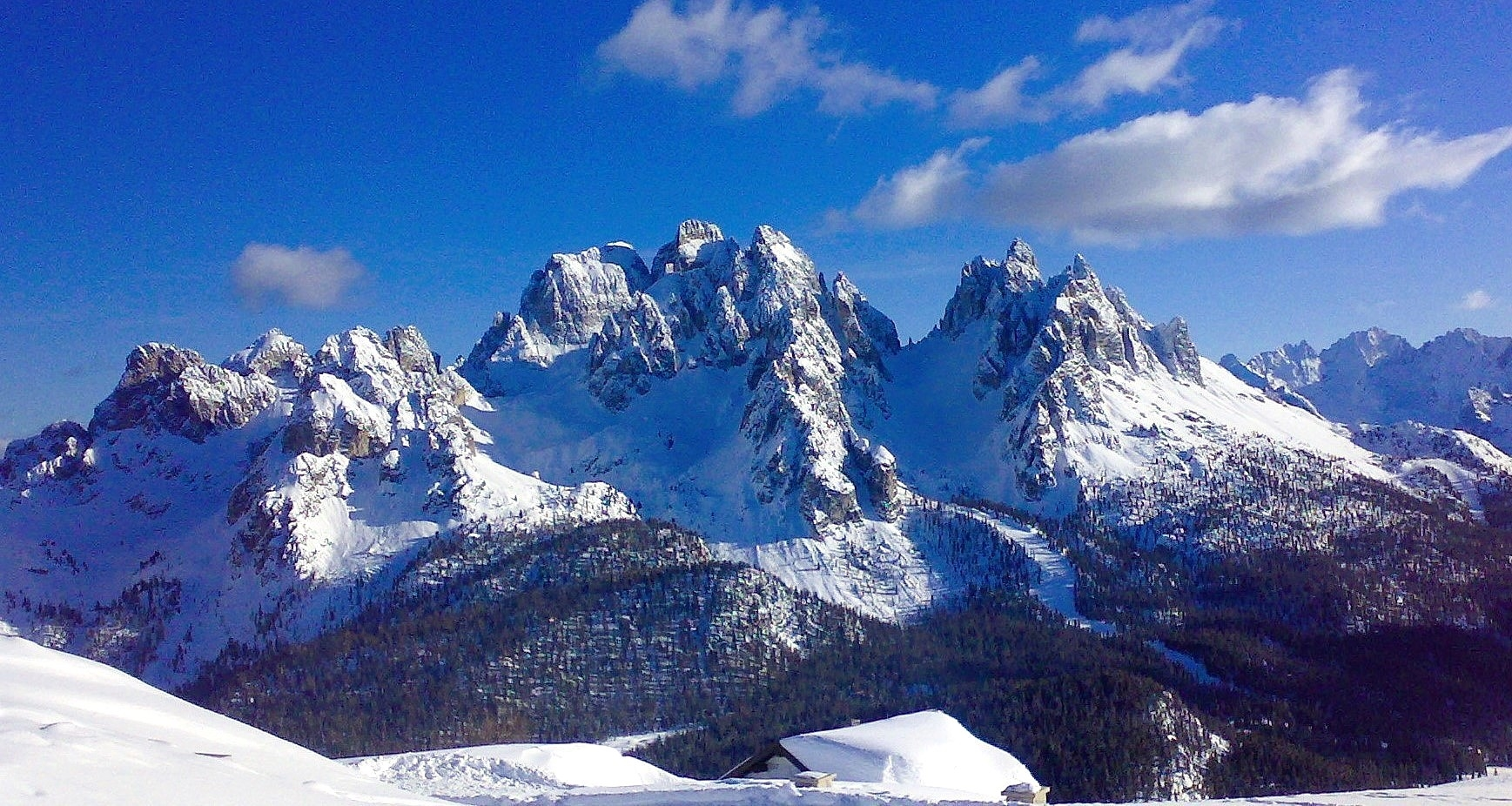
Cima Cadin di San Lucano in winter

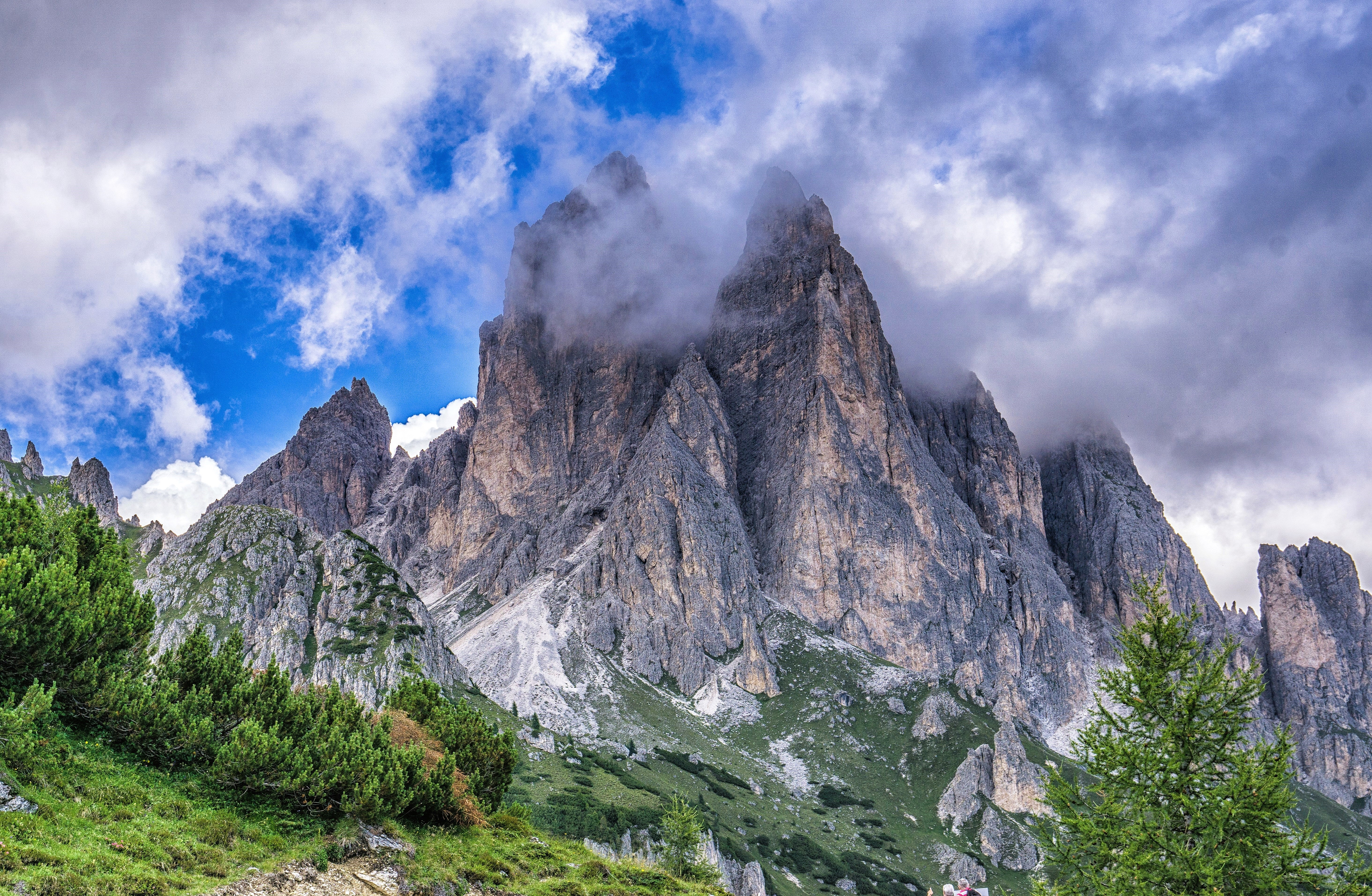
South aspect from Rifugio Città di Carpi

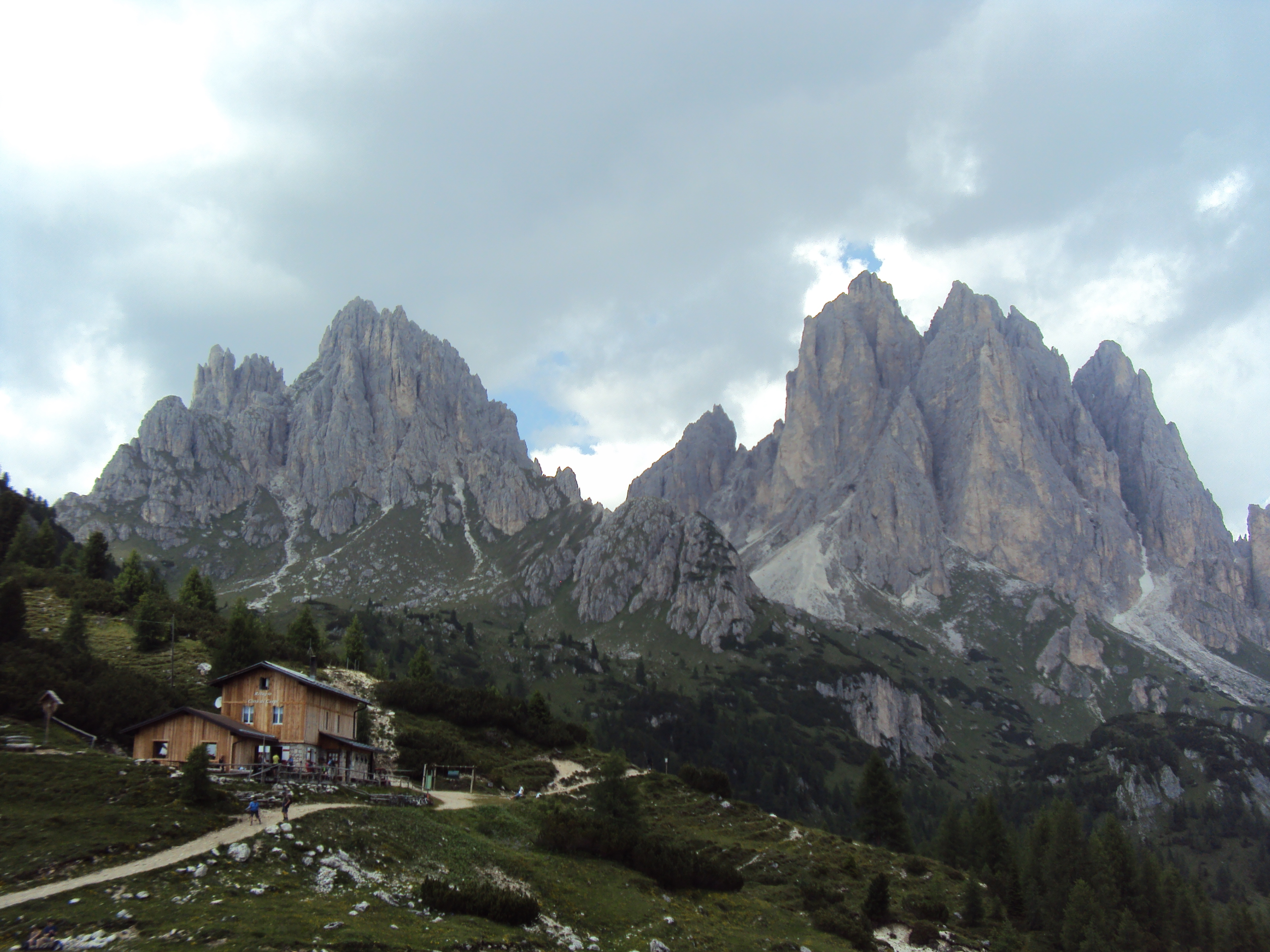
South aspect (right) with Rifugio Città di Carpi

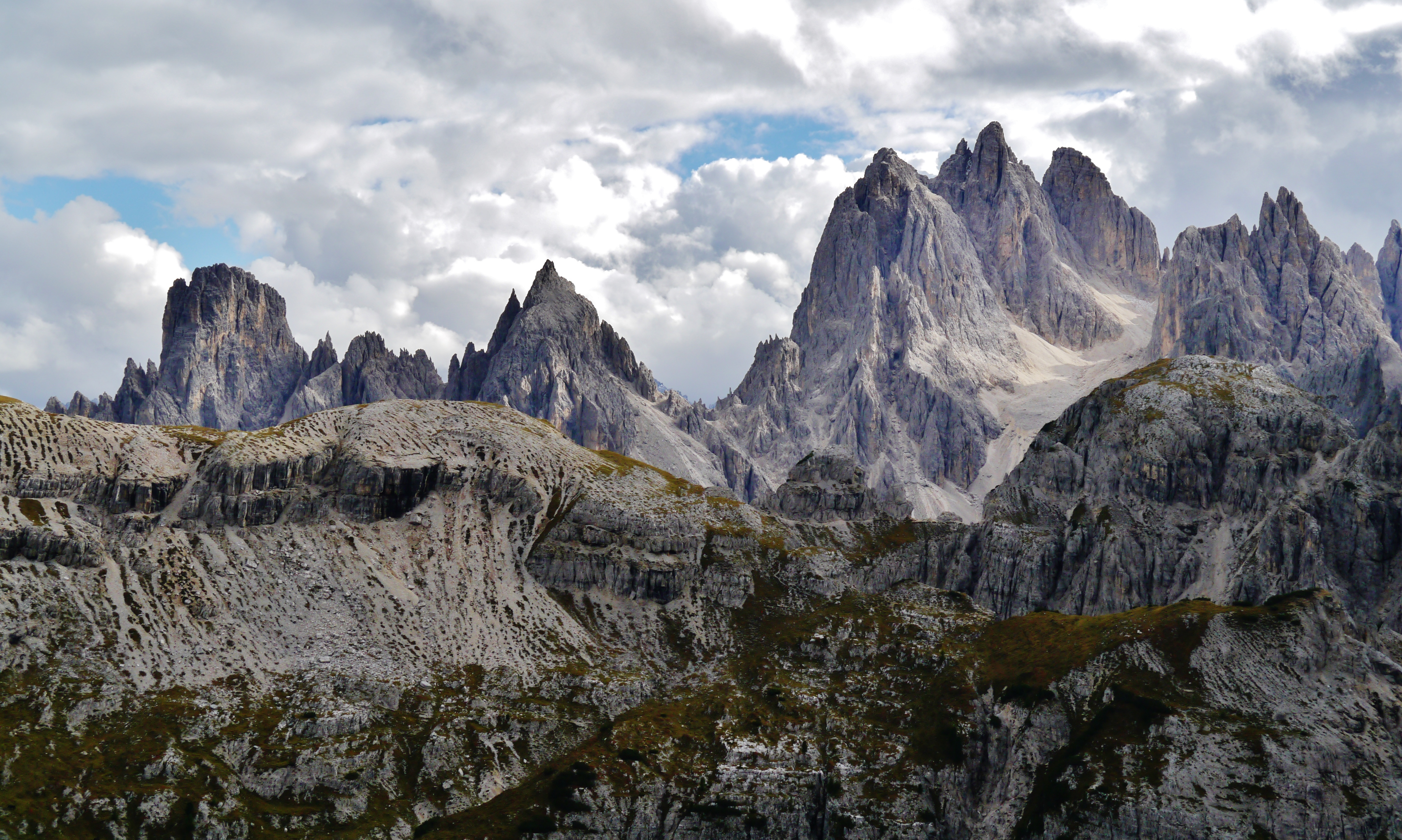
Torre Siorpaes, Cimon di Croda Liscia, and Cima Cadin di San Lucano

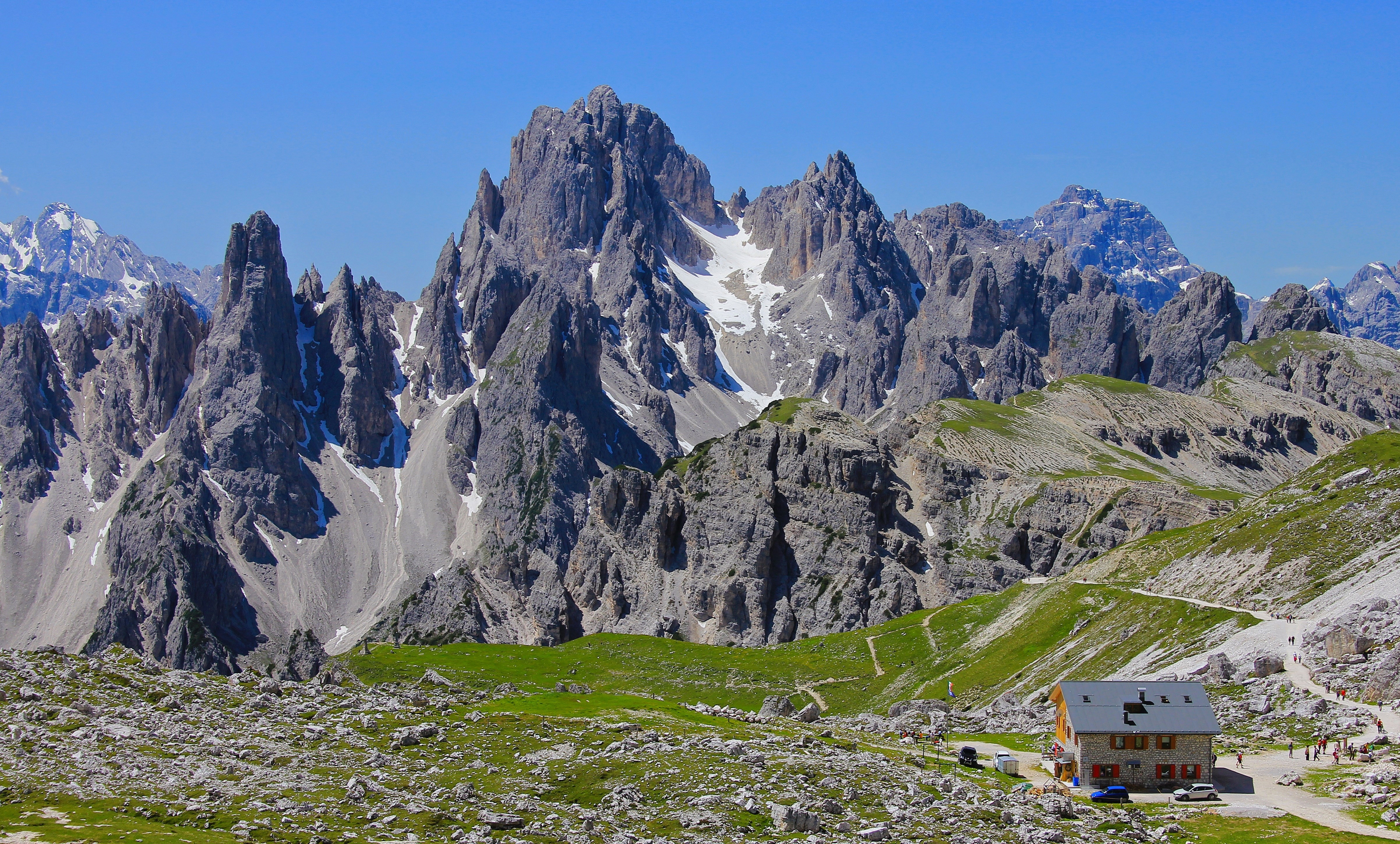
Cima Cadin di San Lucano and Rifugio Lavaredo (lower right)

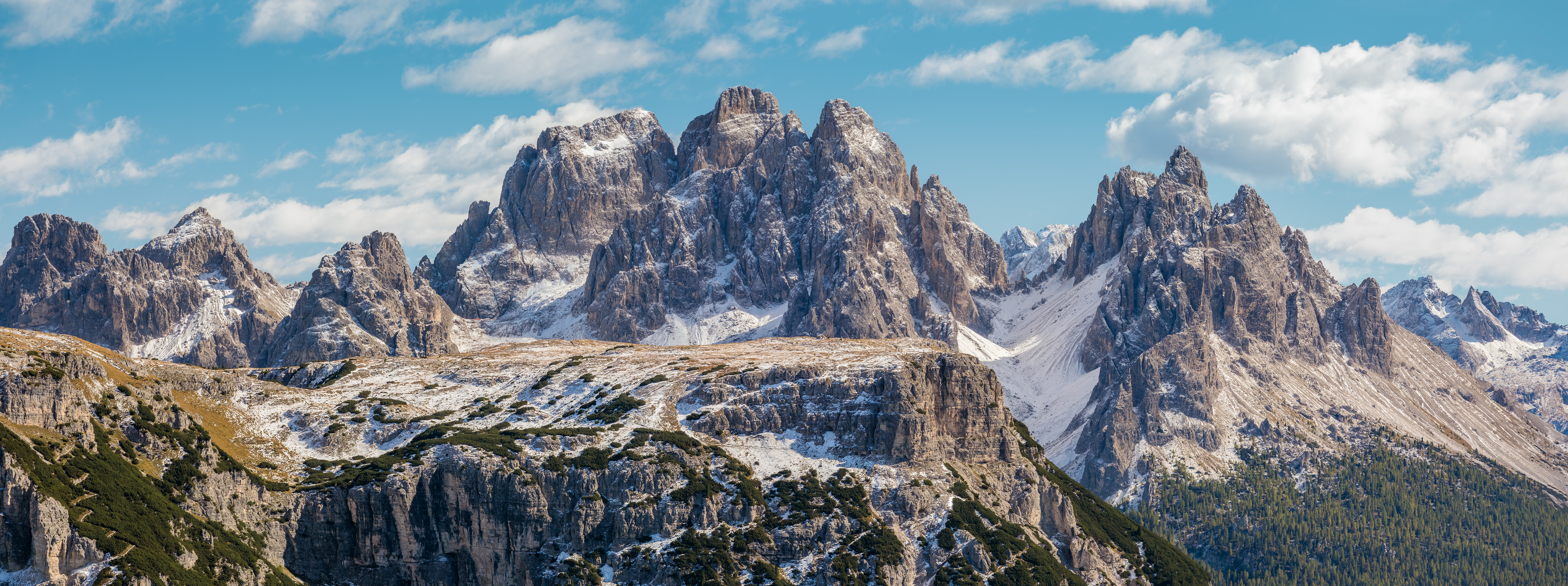
From the northeast

== See also ==
- Southern Limestone Alps
