= Cadini di Misurina =

Mountain range in the Dolomites in Italy

Coordinates: 46.583288°N 12.191391°E

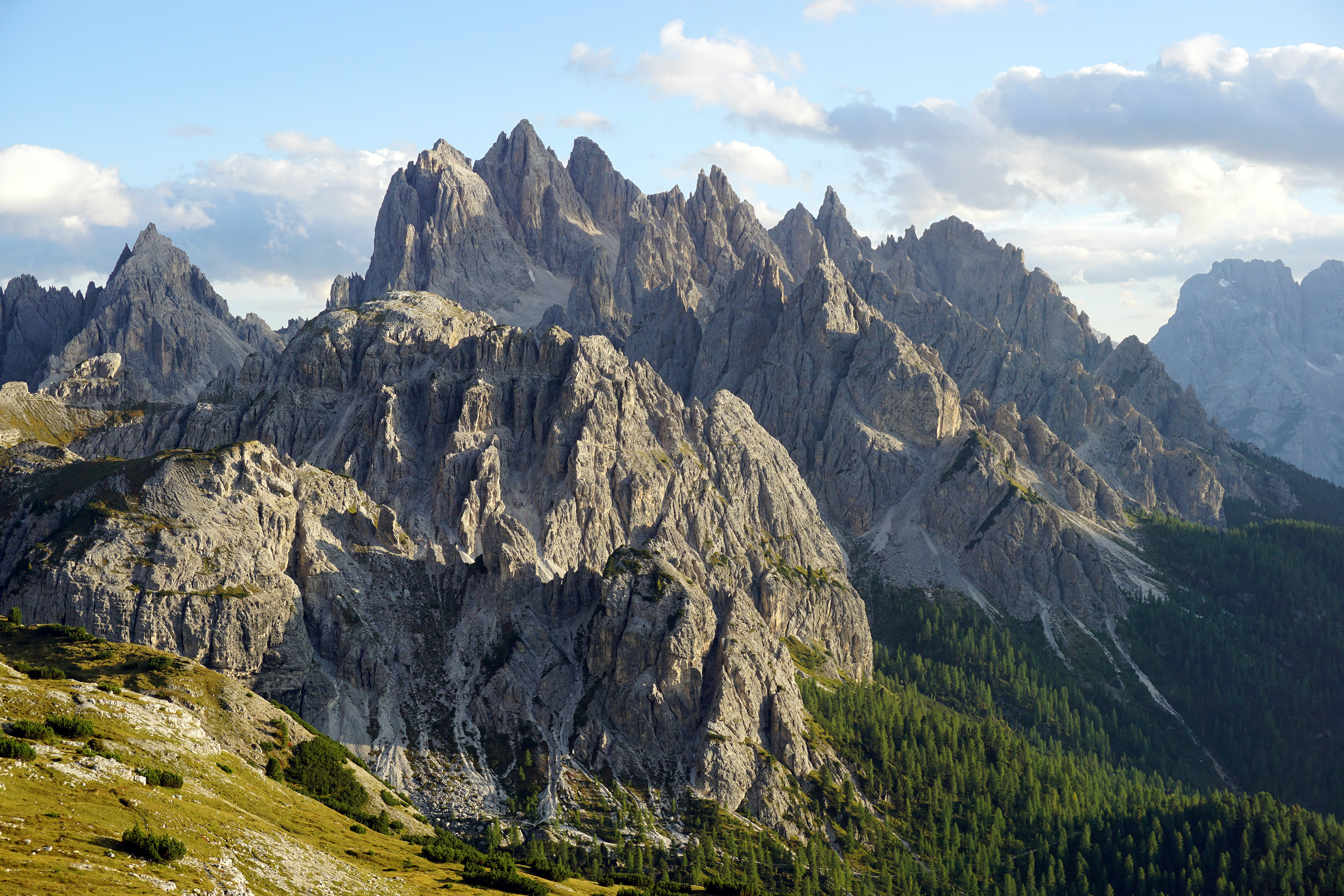
- View on the Cadini mountain group

Highest point
- Peak: Cima Cadin di San Lucano
- Elevation: 2,839 m (9,314 ft)

Geography
- Country: Italy
- Provinces: Veneto and Belluno
- Parent range: Dolomites

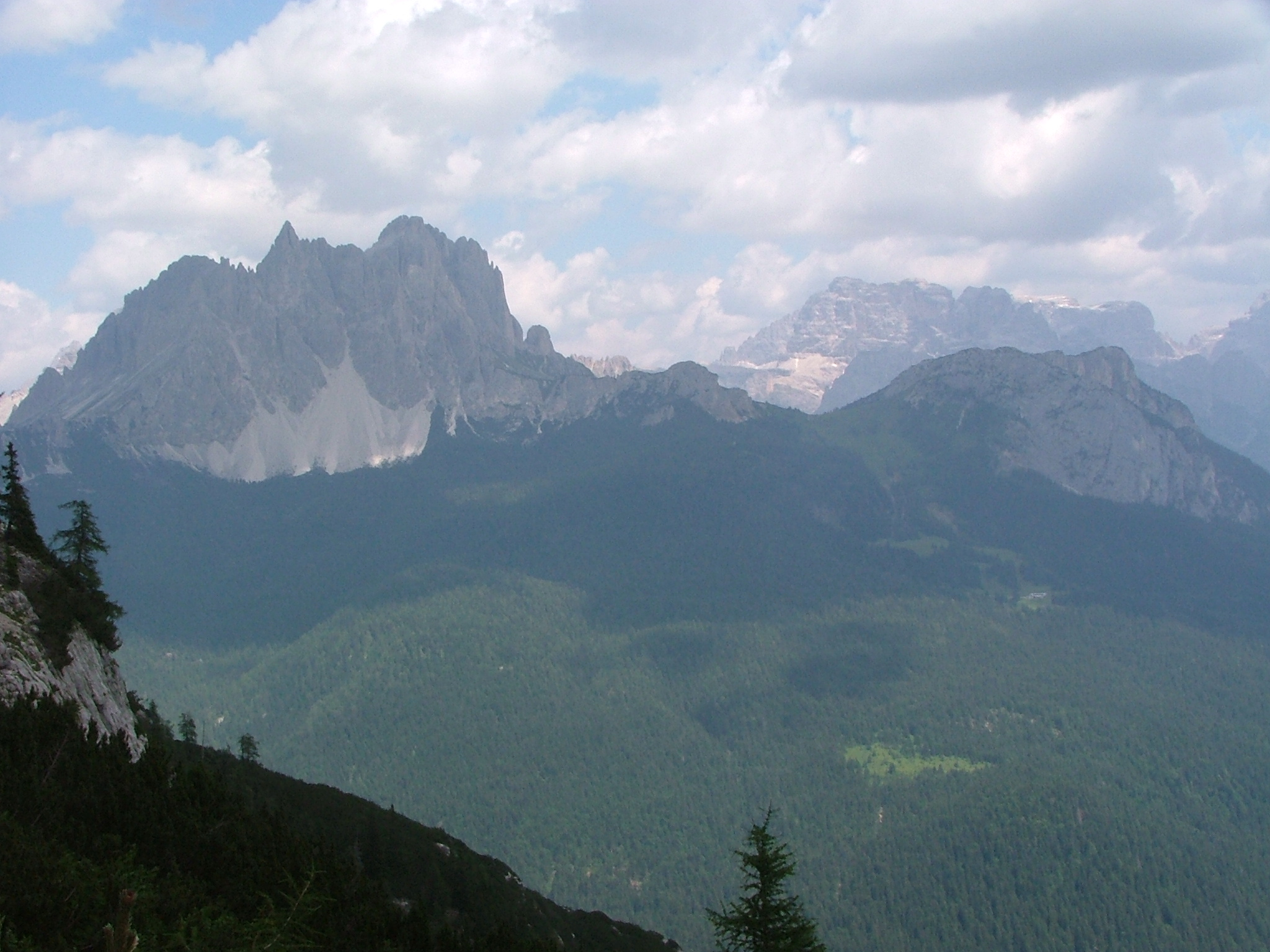
Cadini di Misurina from the Sorapis group

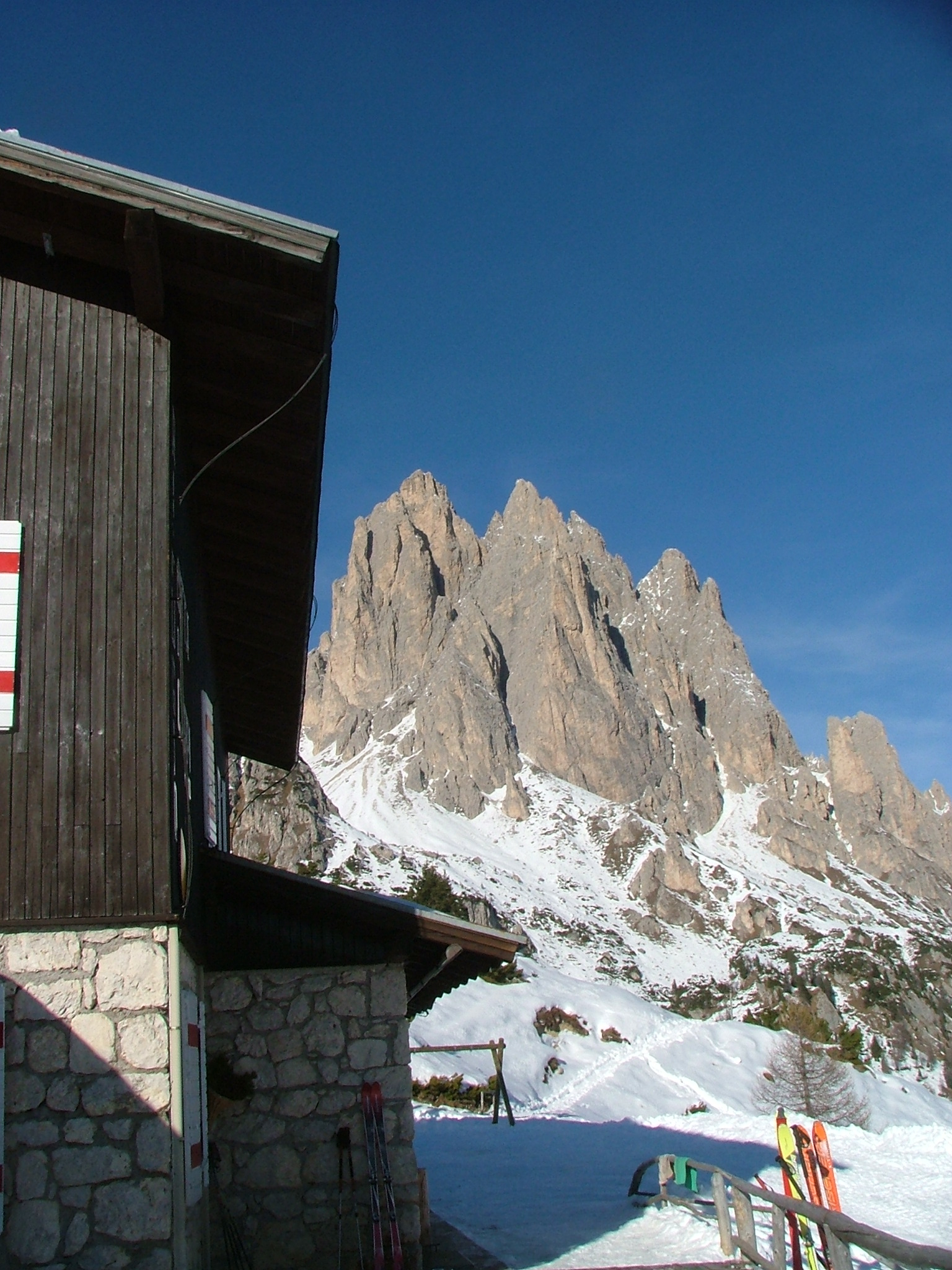
Città di Carpi refuge

Cadini di Misurina (Ciadìs de Meśorìna in Ladin) is a group of mountains in the eastern Dolomites in the Province of Belluno, Italy. These mountains rise to the west of Auronzo di Cadore, north-east of Cortina d'Ampezzo and south of Dobbiaco, in a position overlooking Lake Misurina. They are part of the Dolomites subsection of Sesto, of Braies, and Ampezzo, and belong to the municipality of Auronzo di Cadore. The highest peak is the Cima Cadin of San Lucano (2.839 m a.s.l.).

The term Cadini derives from the Cadorino dialect ''ciadìn'' which translates into valleys and refers to the labyrinthine structure of the massif.

== Description ==
The mountain range is crossed by the Alta Via n. 4 path and from the equipped Alberto Bonacossa path, which starts from the southern shore of the lake and reaches the Tre Cime di Lavaredo. The particular geomorphology that characterizes the Cadini di Misurina allows crossing the group by various lines. The equipped path Giovanni Durissini, for example, provides a tour of the branch of San Lucano by a ring route, starting at the Fonda-Savio refuge (2,367 m), which runs in sequence the Torre fork (2,400 m), the Sabbee fork (2,440 m), the Cadin Deserto fork (2,400 m), the Cristina fork, the de la Neve fork (2,471 m) and the Nevaio fork (2,620 m), with a total height difference of about 1,000 m.

The first climb dates to 31 August 1896 by Giovanni Siorpaes, Pietro Siorpaes, Ilona Eötvös, Rolanda Eötvös, Johann Innerkofler, and Loránd Eötvös.

Another hike towards Cadini di Misurina is from Rifugio Auronzo. The short and easy hike leads to an instagram-famous Cadini di Misurina viewpoint - an outcrop of a rock with steep cliffs on all sides. It's a 3.2 km loop hike that you can do in less than 2 hours (roundtrip).

Accommodation facilities include refuge Fonda-Savio (2367 m), refuge Col da Varda (2115 m), and refuge Città di Carpi (2110 m).

== Main summits ==
- Cima Cadin di San Lucano, 2839 m
- Cima Eötvös, 2825 m
- Cima Cadin Nord Est, 2788 m
- Cima Cadin della Neve, 2757 m
- Cima Cadin Nord Ovest, 2726 m
- Campanile Dülfer, 2706 m
- Cima Cadin di Misurina, 2674 m
- Torre del Diavolo, 2598 m
- Cimon di Croda Liscia, 2569 m
- Torre Siorpaes, 2553 m
- Torre Wundt, 2517 m
- Cima Cadin di Rimbianco, 2404 m
- Torre Leo, 2550 m
- Punta Cadin de le Pere, 2550 m

== Main passes ==
- Forcella del Nevaio, 2620 m
- Forcella Verzi, 2550 m
- Forcella de la Neve, 2471 m
- Forcella Sabbiosa, 2440 m
- Forcella di Misurina, 2400 m
- Forcella Cadin Deserto, 2400 m
- Forcella della Torre, 2400 m
- Forcella del Diavolo, 2380 m
- Forcella Maraia, 2100 m
