= Cimon di Croda Liscia =

Mountain in Italy

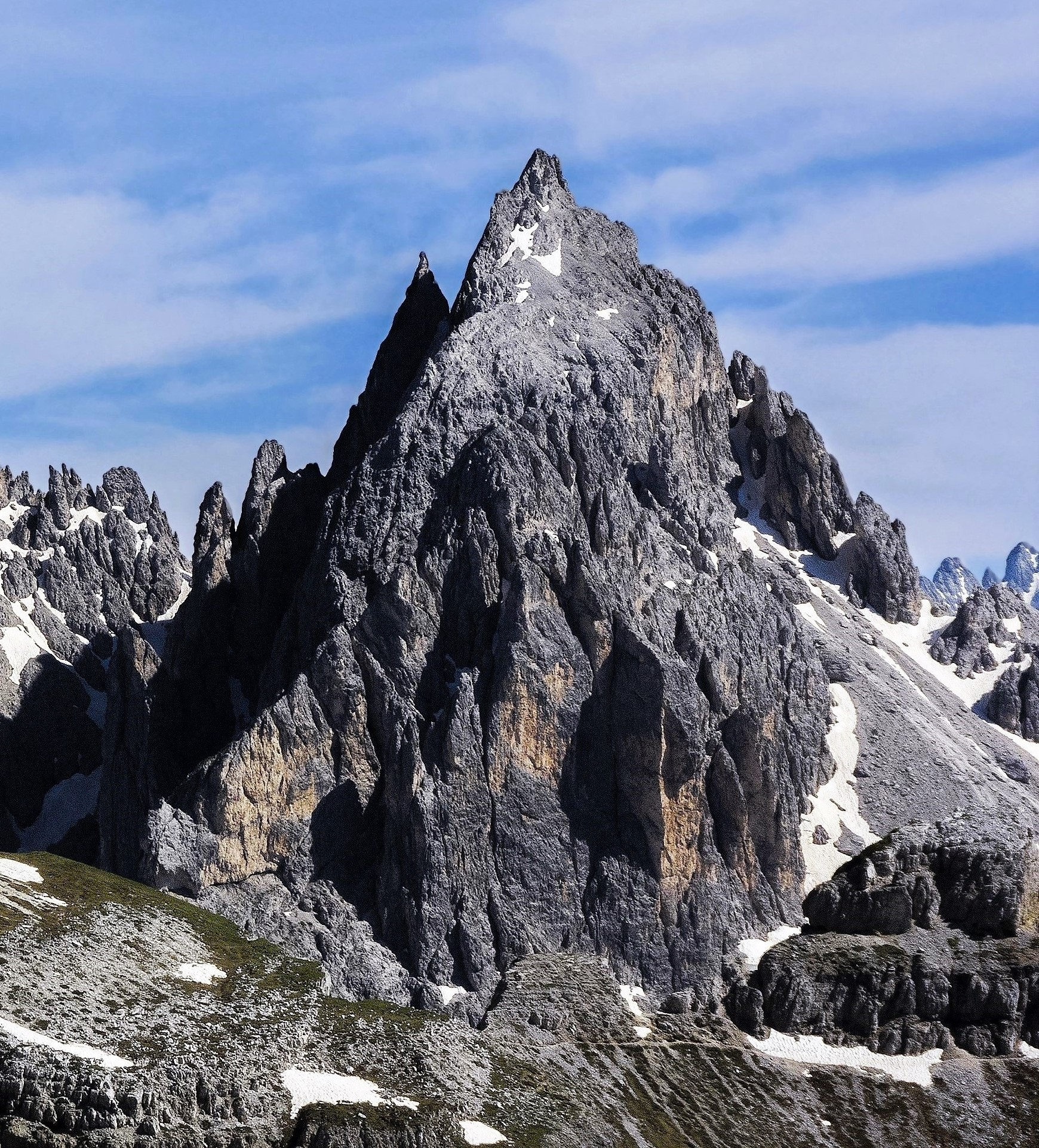
- North aspect

Highest point
- Elevation: 2,569 m (8,428 ft)
- Prominence: 174 m (571 ft)
- Parent peak: Cima Cadin di San Lucano
- Isolation: 0.8 km (0.50 mi)
- Coordinates: 46°35′10″N 12°17′44″E

Geography
- Location within Italy
- Country: Italy
- Province: Belluno
- Protected area: Drei Zinnen / Tre Cime Nature Park
- Parent range: Dolomites; Cadini di Misurina
- Topo map: Tabacco 03 Ampezzo Dolomites

Geology
- Rock age: Triassic
- Rock type: Dolomite

Cimon di Croda Liscia is a summit in the Province of Belluno in northern Italy.

== Description ==
Cimon di Croda Liscia is a 2,569-meter-elevation (8,428-foot) summit in the Cadini di Misurina of the Dolomites, a UNESCO World Heritage Site. Set in the Veneto region, the peak is located 11 kilometers (6.8 miles) west of the town of Auronzo di Cadore, and the peak is set in Drei Zinnen / Tre Cime Nature Park. Precipitation runoff from the peak drains into tributaries of the Ansiei River, which in turn is a tributary of the Piave. Topographic relief is significant as the summit rises 670 meters (2,198 feet) above Campedelle Valley in one kilometer (0.6 mile), and 1,000 meters (3,281 feet) above Onge Valley in 1.5 kilometers (0.93 mile). The nearest higher neighbor is Torrione Alvise, 0.8 kilometer (0.5 mile) to the west-southwest. The toponym translates as "Peak of the Smooth Crag."

== Climate ==
Based on the Köppen climate classification, Cimon di Croda Liscia is located in an alpine climate zone with long, cold winters, and short, mild summers. Weather systems are forced upwards by the mountains (orographic lift), causing moisture to drop in the form of rain and snow. The months of June through September offer the most favorable weather for visiting or climbing in this area.

== Gallery ==
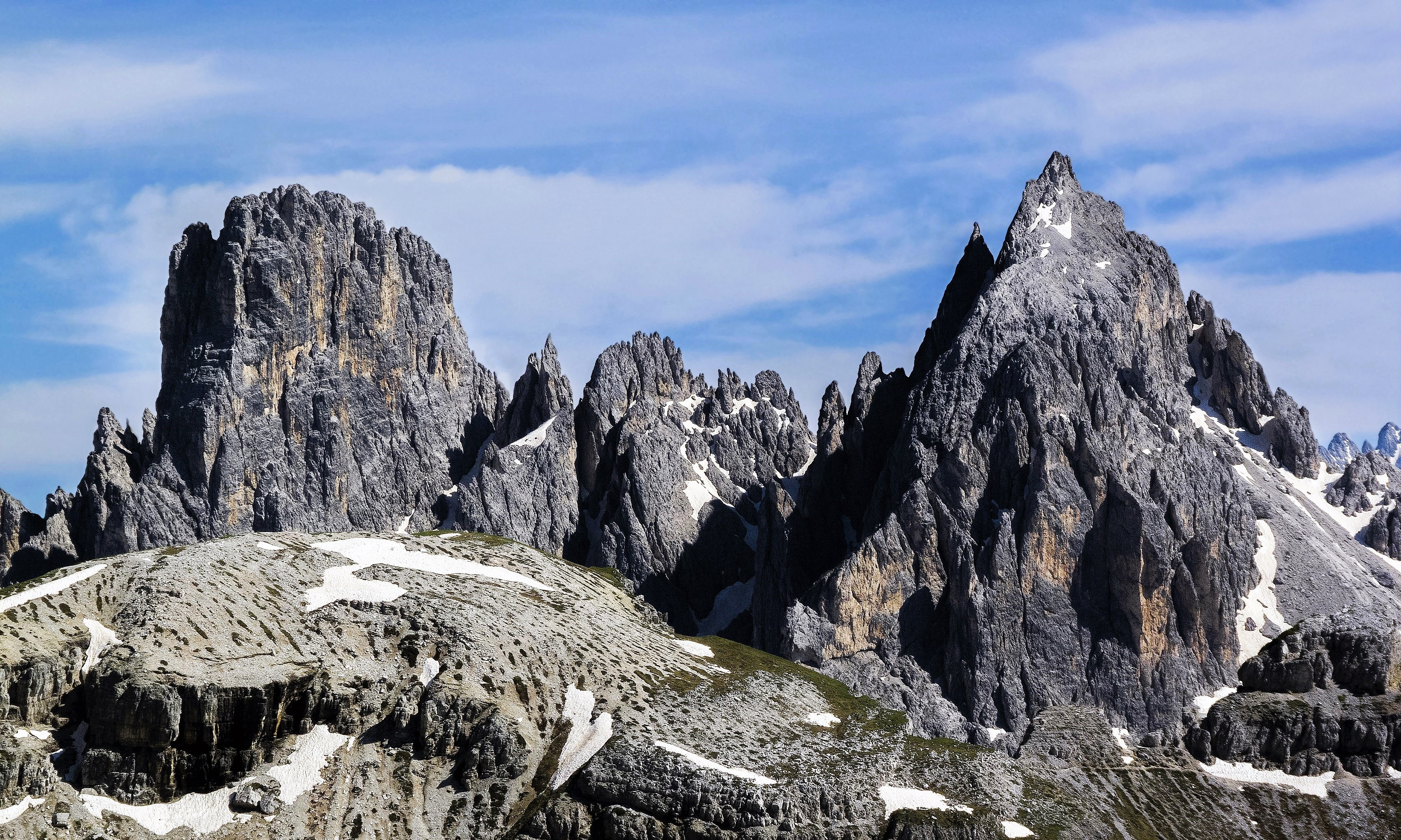
Torre Siorpaes (left) and Cimon di Croda Liscia (right)

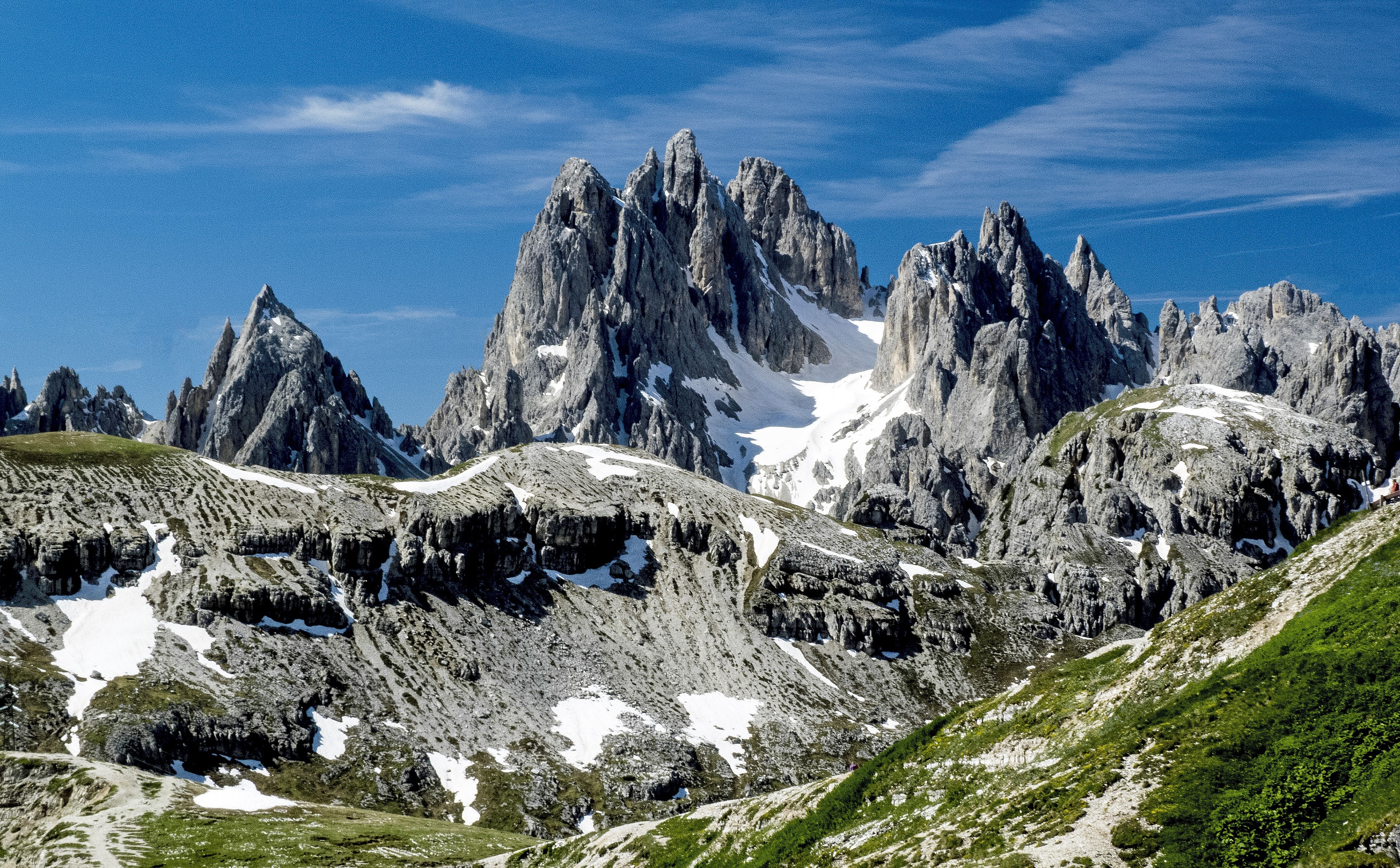
Cima Cadin di San Lucano centered and Cimon di Croda Liscia to left

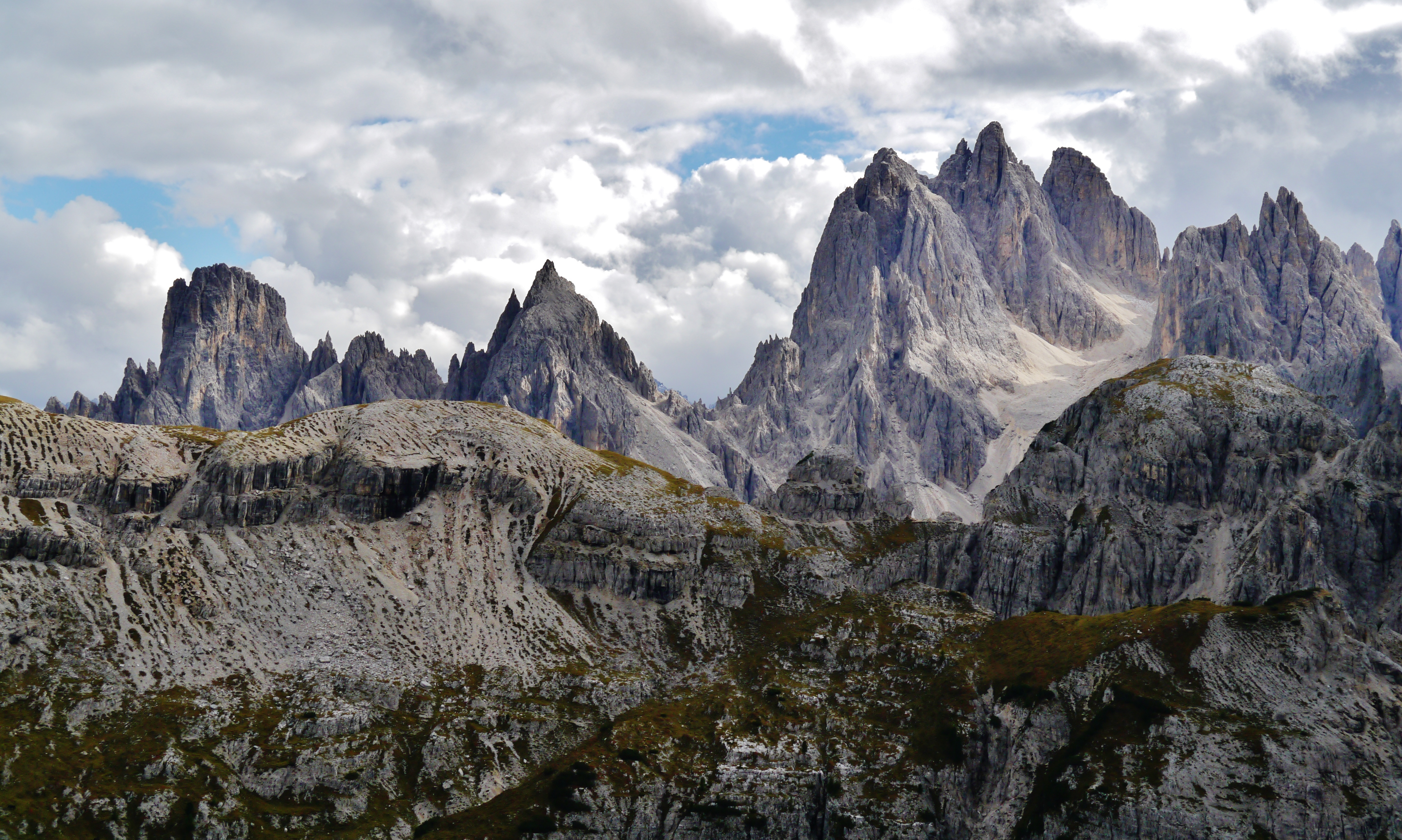
Torre Siorpaes, Cimon di Croda Liscia, and Cima Cadin di San Lucano

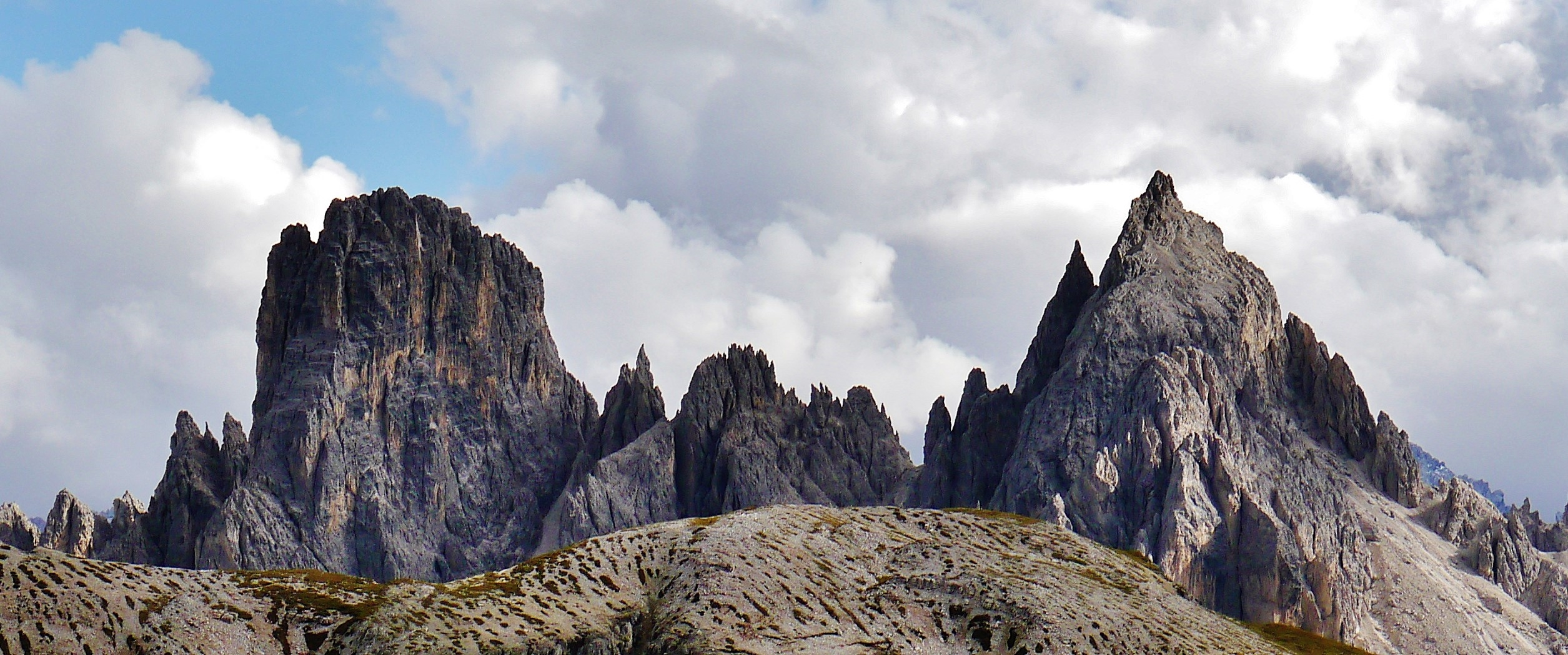
Torre Siorpaes (left) and Cimon di Croda Liscia (right)

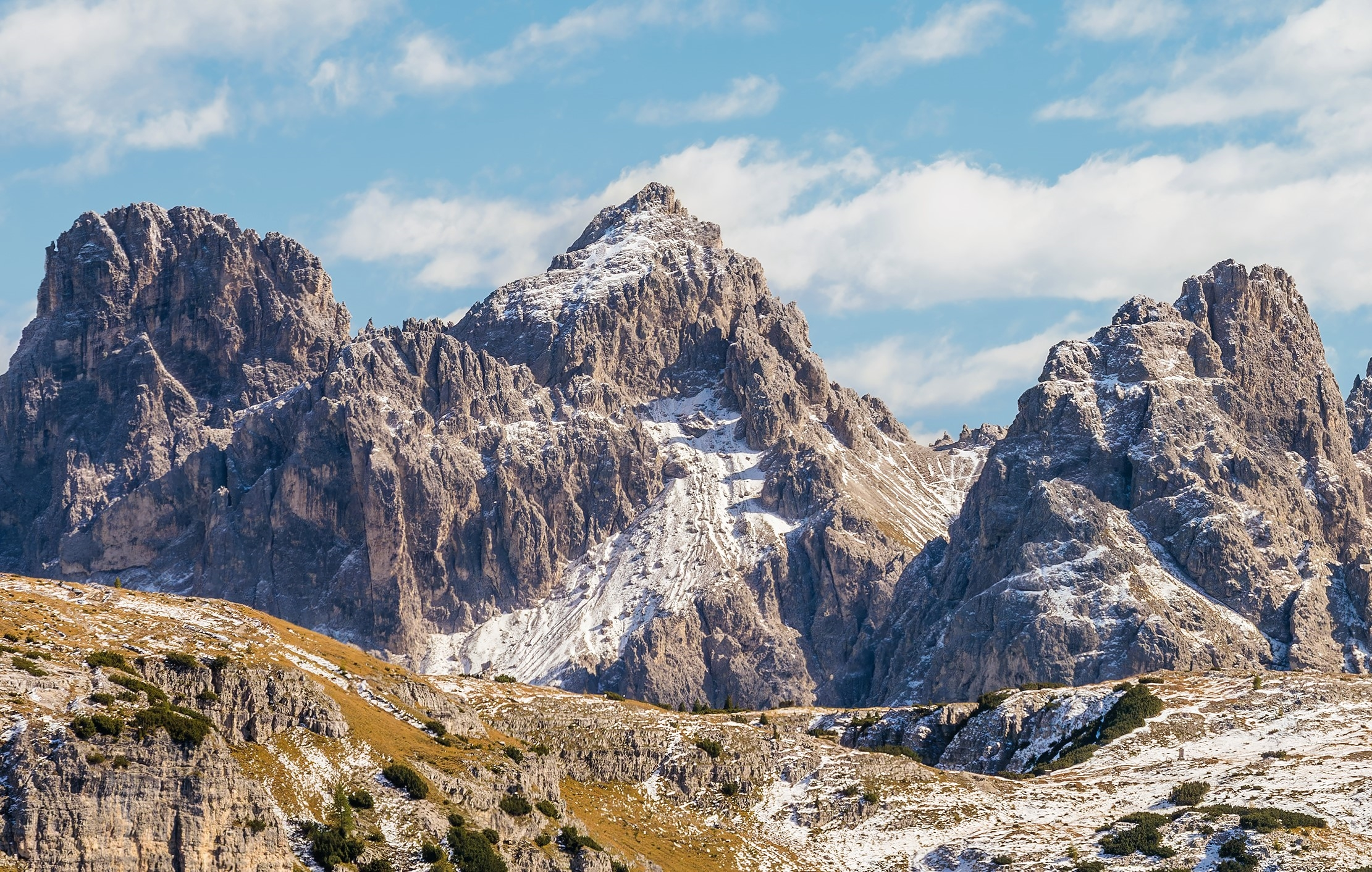
L→Rː Torre Siorpaes, Cimon di Croda Liscia, Torre Wundt

== See also ==
- Southern Limestone Alps
