= Torre Siorpaes =

Mountain in Italy

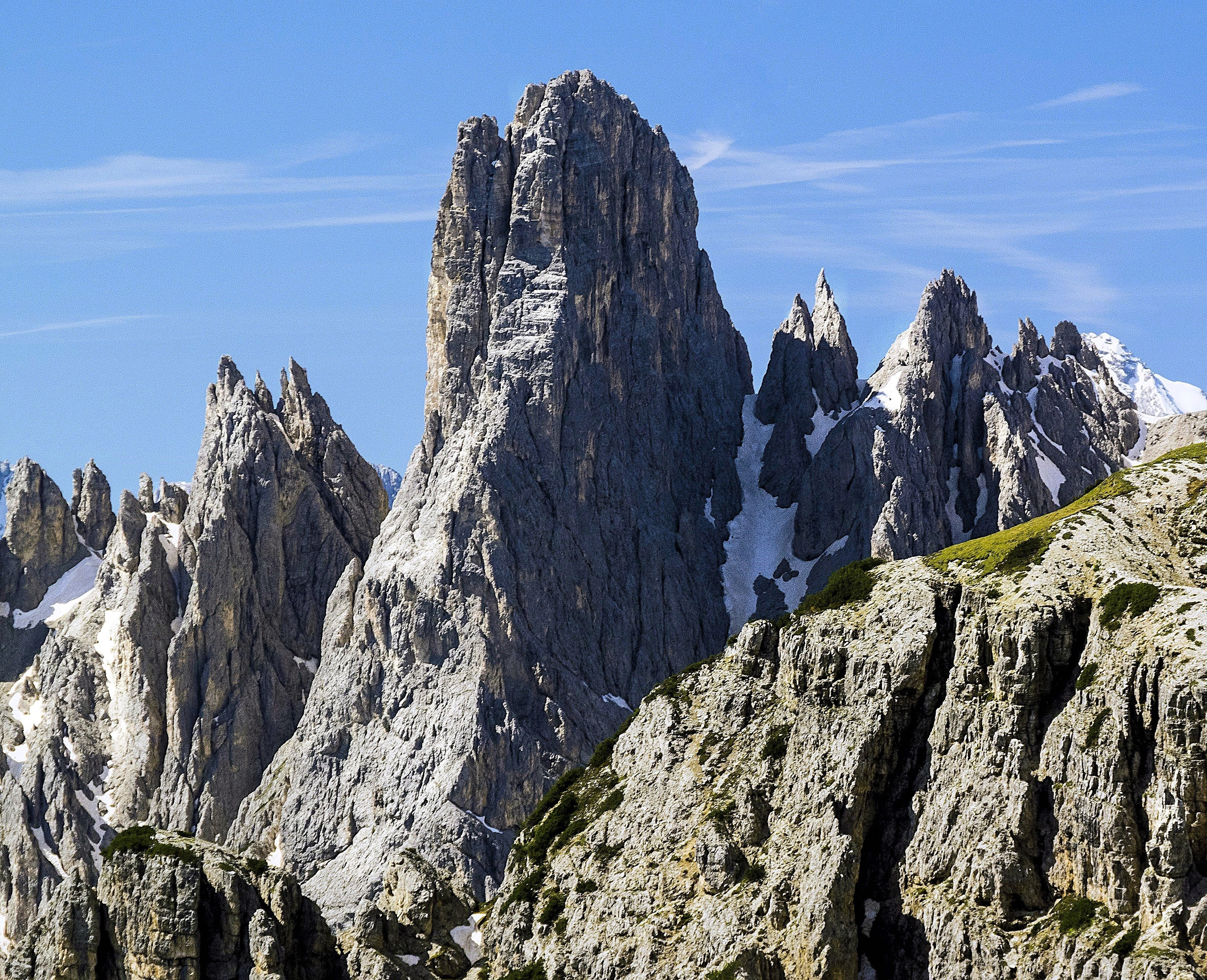
- North aspect

Highest point
- Elevation: 2,556 m (8,386 ft)
- Prominence: 176 m (577 ft)
- Parent peak: Cimon di Croda Liscia
- Isolation: 0.35 km (0.22 mi)
- Coordinates: 46°35′12″N 12°18′00″E

Geography
- Location within Italy
- Country: Italy
- Province: Belluno
- Protected area: Drei Zinnen / Tre Cime Nature Park
- Parent range: Dolomites; Cadini di Misurina
- Topo map: Tabacco 03 Ampezzo Dolomites

Geology
- Rock age: Triassic
- Rock type: Dolomite

Climbing
- First ascent: 1896

Torre Siorpaes is a summit in the Province of Belluno in northern Italy.

== Description ==
Torre Siorpaes is a 2,556-meter-elevation (8,386-foot) summit in the Cadini di Misurina of the Dolomites, a UNESCO World Heritage Site. Set in the Veneto region, the peak is located 11 kilometers (6.8 miles) west of the town of Auronzo di Cadore, and the peak is set in Drei Zinnen / Tre Cime Nature Park. Precipitation runoff from the tower drains into tributaries of the Ansiei River, which in turn is a tributary of the Piave. Topographic relief is significant as the summit rises 750 meters (2,460 feet) above Campedelle Valley in one kilometer (0.6 mile), and 900 meters (2,953 feet) above Onge Valley in one kilometer (0.6 mile). The first ascent of the summit was accomplished on August 29, 1896, by Giovanni Siorpaes, Josef Innerkofler, Agostino Verzi, Adolf Witzenmann, and Emil Witzenmann from the west side. The toponym translates as "Siorpaes Tower" wherein Siorpaes refers to Italian mountaineer Giovanni Siorpaes, whose father Santo Siorpaes made the first ascent of nearby Cima Cadin di San Lucano in 1870. The nearest higher neighbor is Cimon di Croda Liscia, 0.35 kilometers (0.22 miles) to the west.

== Climate ==
Based on the Köppen climate classification, Torre Siorpaes is located in an alpine climate zone with long, cold winters, and short, mild summers. Weather systems are forced upwards by the mountains (orographic lift), causing moisture to drop in the form of rain and snow. The months of June through September offer the most favorable weather for visiting or climbing in this area.

== Gallery ==
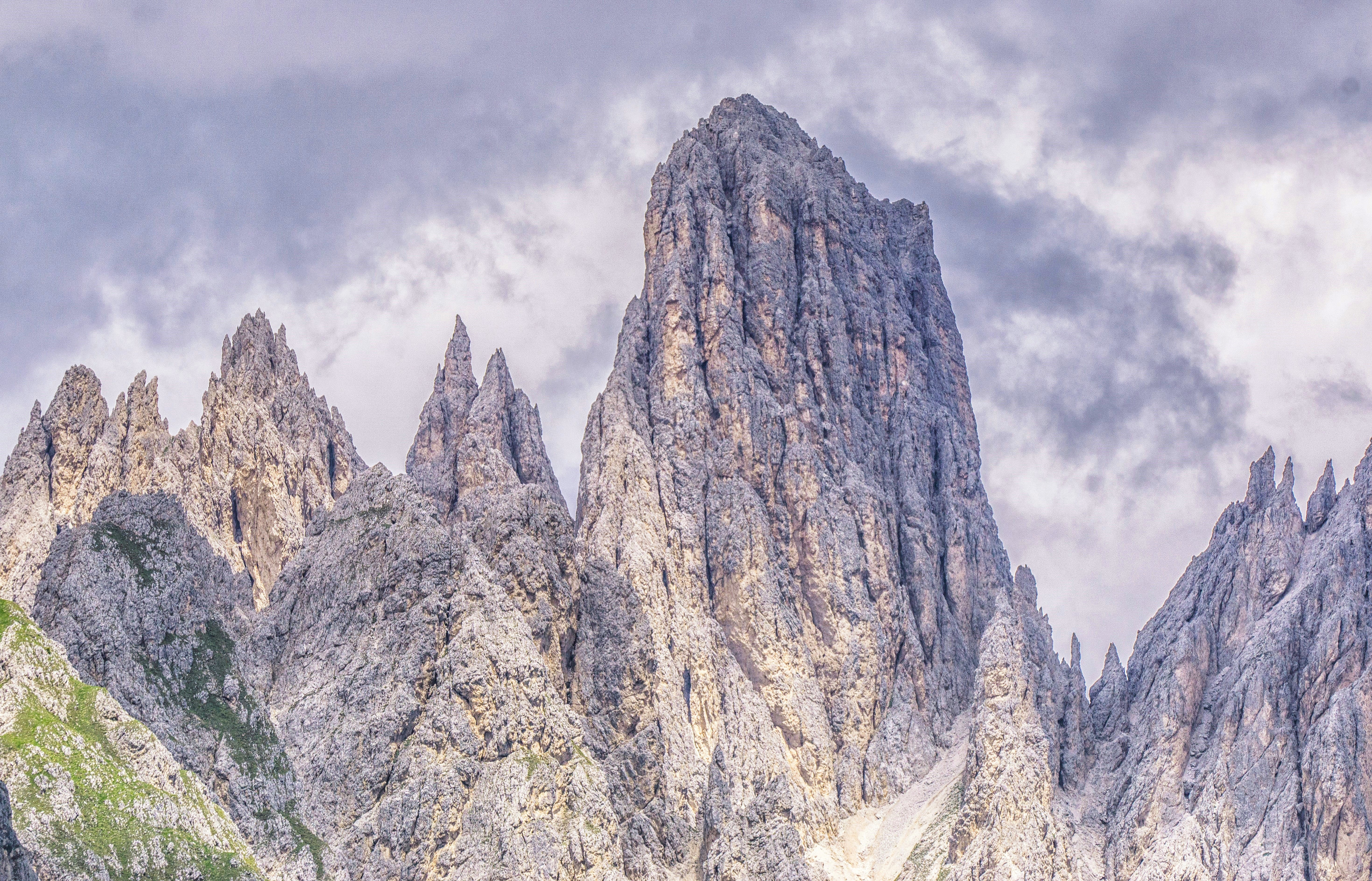
South aspect of Torre Siorpaes viewed from Rifugio Citta di Carpi mountain hut

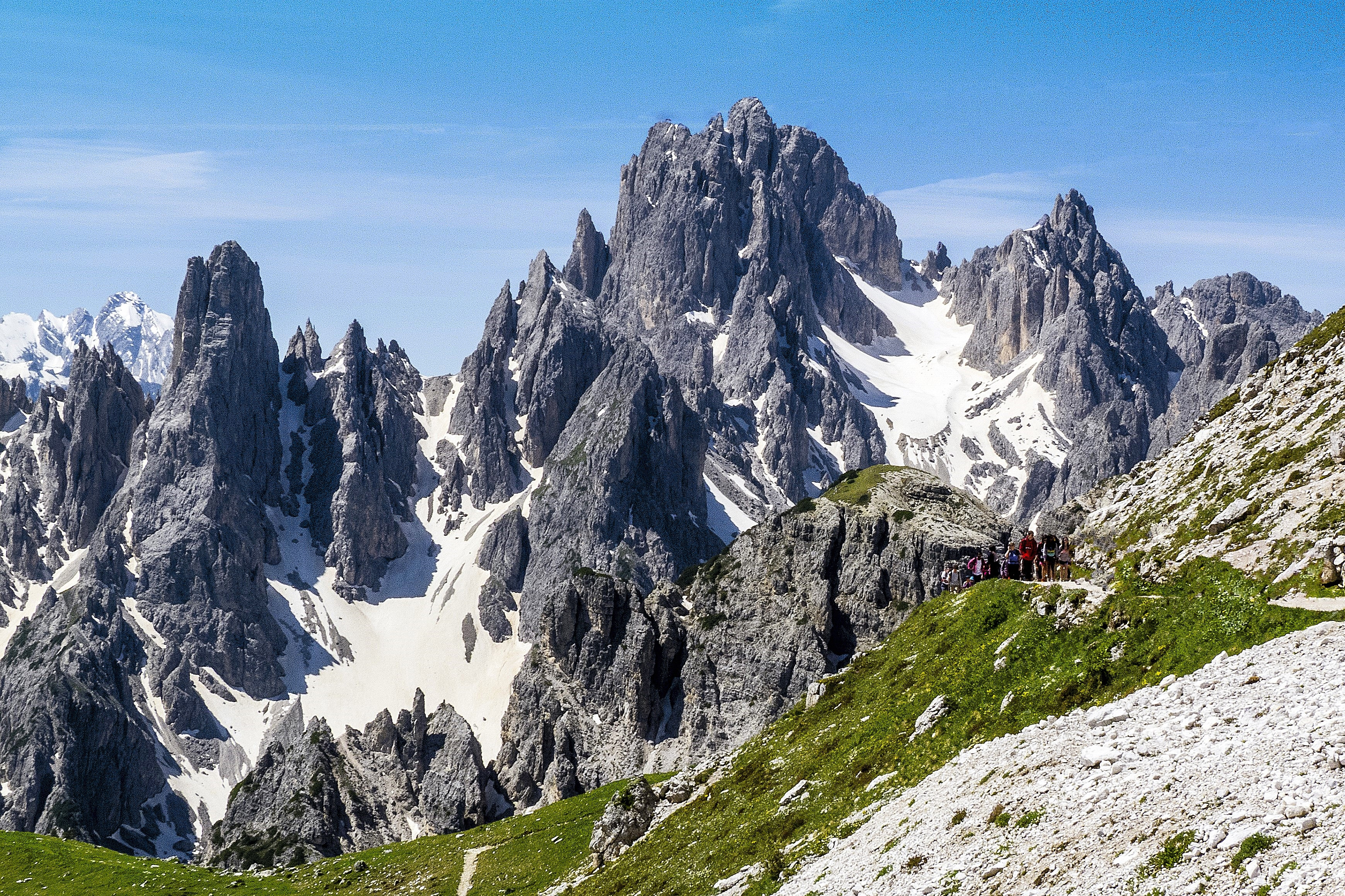
North aspect of Torre Siorpaes to left, with Cima Cadin di San Lucano centered

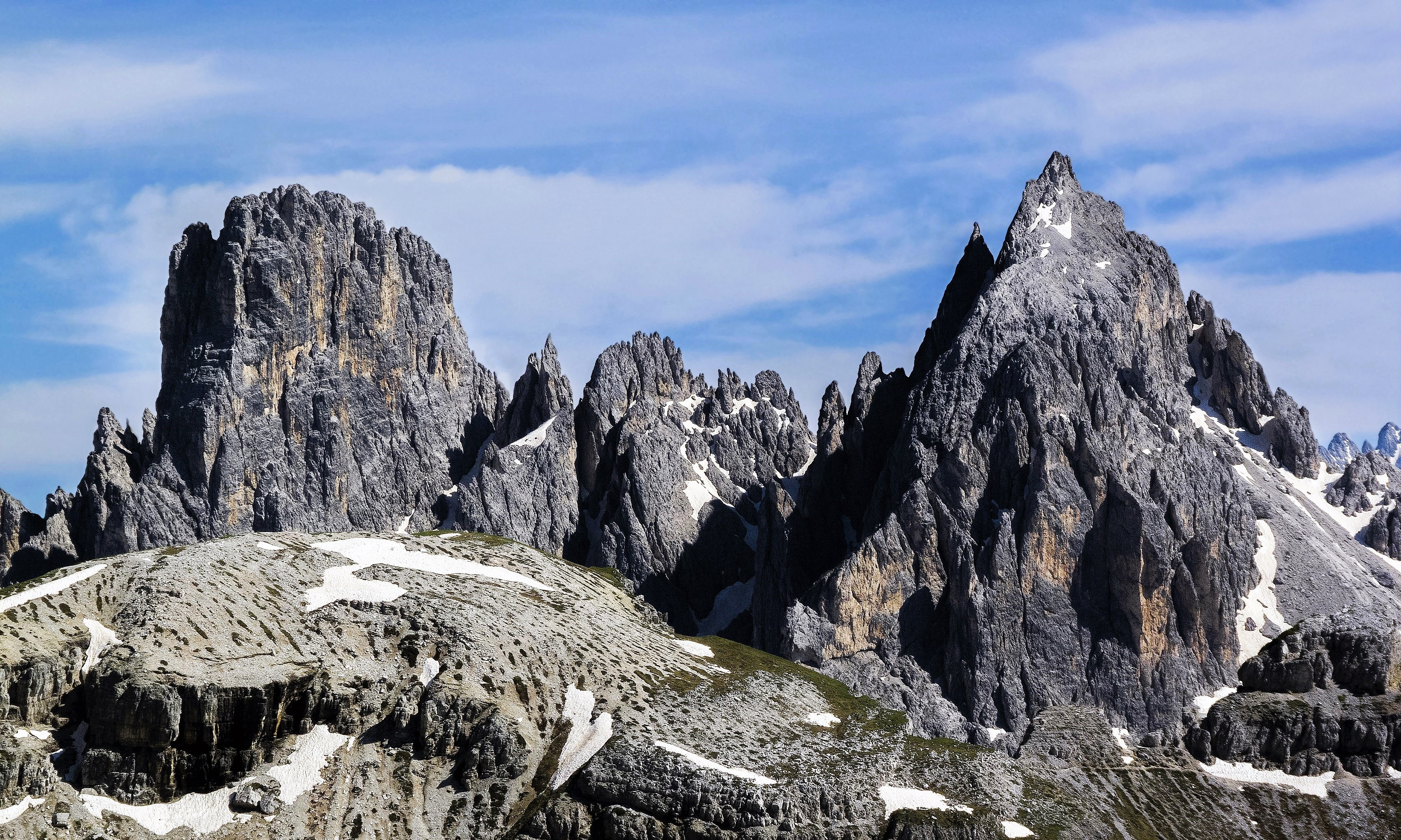
Torre Siorpaes (left) and Cimon di Croda Liscia (right)

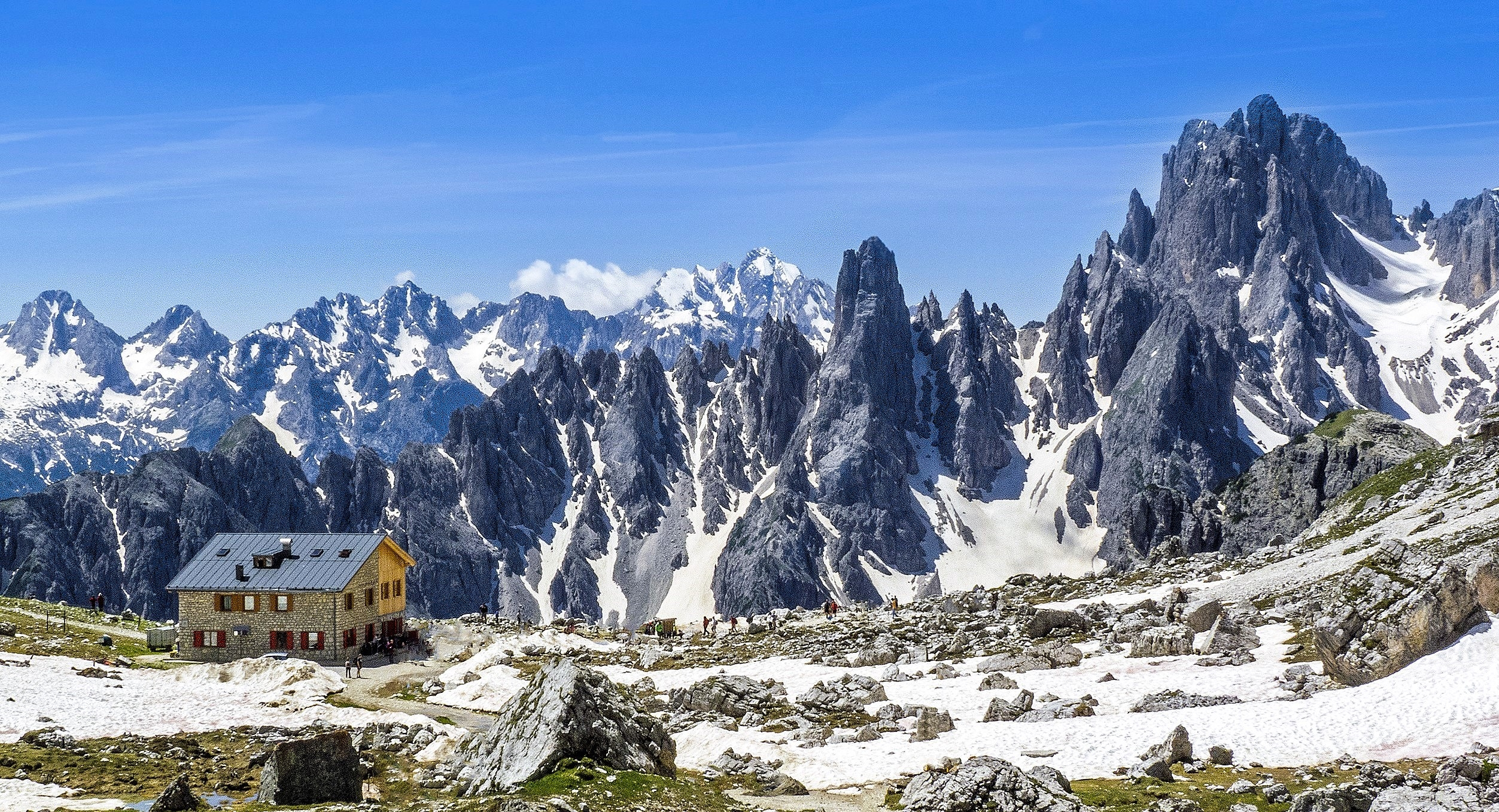
Rifugio Lavaredo (left), Torre Siorpaes, and Cima Cadin di San Lucano (right)

== See also ==
- Southern Limestone Alps
