= Giovanni Siorpaes =

Italian mountaineer (1869–1909)

Giovanni Siorpaes (1869 in Cortina d'Ampezzo – 1909) was an Italian mountaineer. Santo Siorpaes was his father.

He made the first ascent of Torre Siorpaes on August 29, 1896.
