= Cadorino dialect =

Ladin dialect of Italy

Cadorino
- Native to: Italy
- Language family: Indo-European: Italic; Latino-Faliscan; Romance; Italo-Western; Western Romance; Gallo-Romance; Rhaeto-Romance or Gallo-Rhaetian; Ladin; Cadorino

Language codes
- ISO 639-3: –
- Glottolog: cado1235
- Cadorino dialect

Cadorino, a dialect of Ladin, is the language of Cadore, at the feet of the Dolomites in the province of Belluno. It is distinct from neighboring dialects, and though it has received relatively little attention, it is important to an understanding of the linguistic history of northern Italy.

== Morphophonology ==
The principal characteristics of Cadorino are the following:

- Palatalization of *ka, *ga to č, ǧ.
- Retention of final -s in verbal 2nd-person singular.
- Velarization of *l to u before a consonant.
- Vowel breaking of "è" in closed syllables.
- The inflection "òu" of the passive participle of verbs of the first conjugation.
- Retention of a case distinction in 1sg and 2sg pronouns (ió and tū in the nominative, compared to mi and ti in Venetian).

These are all characteristics of Ladin dialects.

== Influences ==
Il dialetto cadorino è un misto di etrusco, di latino, di greco, di slavo, di longobardo, di celtico-friulano, di tedesco, di francese: tutti regali che hanno fatto a noi, come all’altre parti d’Italia, quei graziosi nemici che sono venuti di quando in quando a visitarci.

— Antonio Ronzon, Almanacco Cadorino 1873–1874

Cadorino is spoken in what had once been Paleo-Venetian territory. Toponyms show a strong Celtic presence. There was a Friulian presence around 500 CE, and Cadorino preserves various particularities of Friulian. Over the centuries (Modern) Venetian has expanded into the Cadorino area. While other Ladin varieties were profoundly influenced by Tyrolian dialects of German, these had relatively little influence on Cadorino, which was much more affected by Venetian.

== Recognition ==
Thanks to legislation on the recognition of historical linguistic minorities (Law 482/1999), Cadore is recognized by the province of Belluno along with the dialects of Comelico, Agordino, the high valley of Cordevole, and the Val di Zoldo.

== Bibliography ==
- Ascoli Graziadio Isaia, Saggi ladini, "Archivio Glottologico Italiano", I, 1873.
- Giovan Battista Pellegrini, I dialetti ladino-cadorini, Miscellanea di studi alla memoria di Carlo Battisti, Firenze, Istituto di studi per l'Alto Adige, 1979, pp. 245–265
- Giovan Battista Pellegrini, Il museo Archeologico cadorino e il Cadore preromano e romano, pp. 215–238, Magnifica Comunità di Cadore – Regione Veneto, 1991
- Giovan Battista Pellegrini, La genesi del retoromanzo (o ladino), Max Niemeyer Verlag Tübingen, 1991
- Carlo Battisti, Prefazione al vocabolario ampezzano di A. Majoni del 1929
- Loredana Corrà, Una breve nota linguistica
- Giovan Battista Pellegrini, Raccolta di saggi lessicali in area veneta e alpina, Centro Studio per la dialettologia italiana “Oronzo Parlàngeli”, Consiglio Nazionale delle Ricerche, 1993
- Giovan Battista Pellegrini, Studi storico-linguistici bellunesi e alpini, Archivio storico di Belluno, Feltre e Cadore, 1992
- Anna Marinetti, Aspetti della romanizzazione linguistica nella Cisalpina orientale, Patria diversis gentibus una? Unità politica e identità etniche nell’Italia antica, PISA, ETS, 2008
- Maria Teresa Vigolo – Paola Barbierato, Convergenze cadorino-friulane in ambito toponomastico, Atti del secondo convegno di Toponomastica Friulana (Udine 22 e 23 novembre 2002), in Quaderni di toponomastica friulana, Società Filologica Friulana, Udine 2007.
