= Santo Siorpaes =

Italian mountaineer (1832–1900)

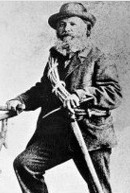
Santo Siorapes

Santo Severino Siorpaes (2 May 1832, Cortina d'Ampezzo – 12 December 1900) was an Italian mountaineer. His son, Giovanni Siorpaes, was also a mountaineer.
