= Tre Cime di Lavaredo =

Mountains in Italy

- Drei Zinnen
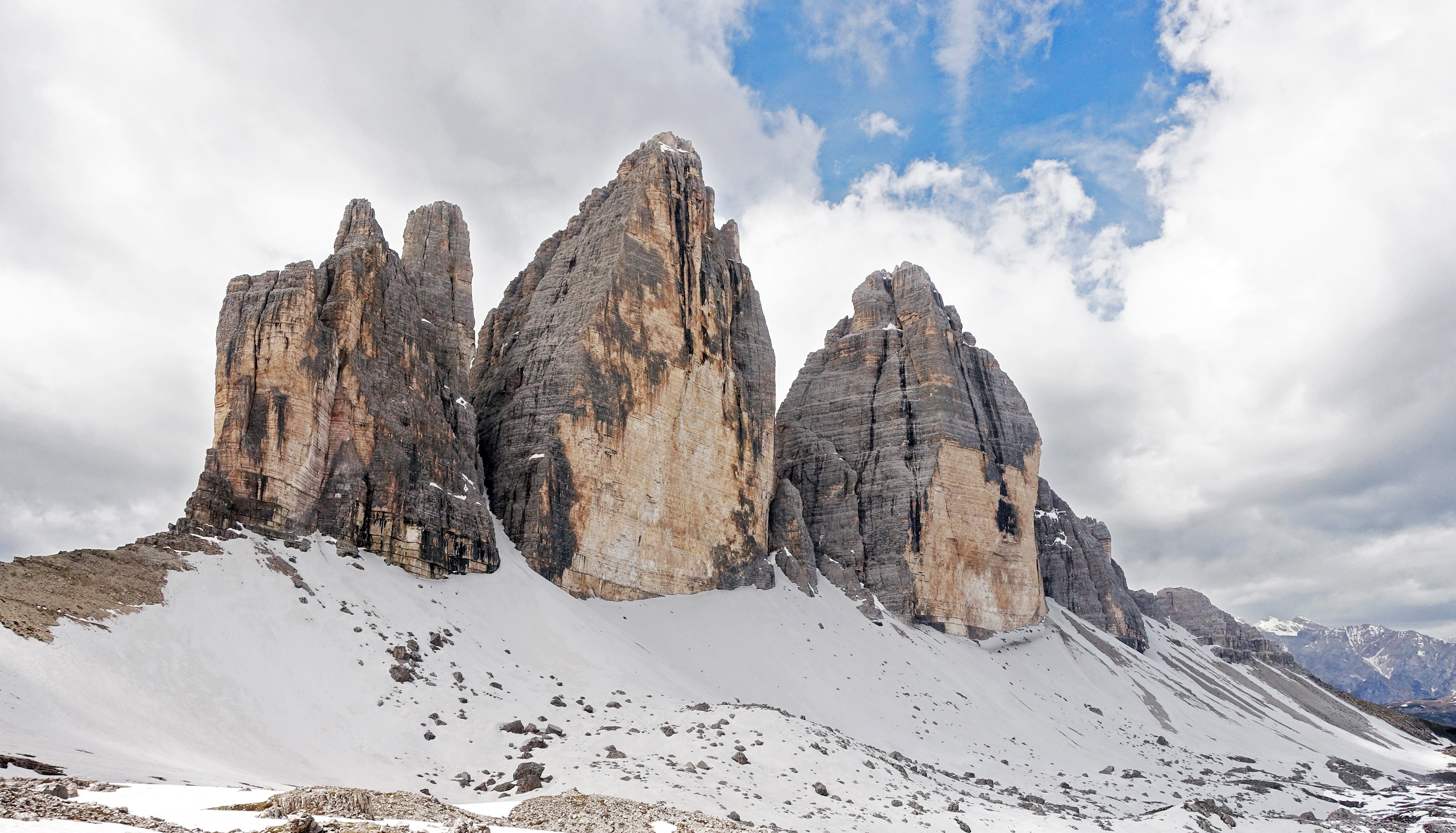
- The north faces of the Tre Cime

Highest point
- Elevation: 2,999 m (9,839 ft)
- Prominence: 568 m (1,864 ft)
- Listing: Great north faces of the Alps
- Coordinates: 46°37′N 12°18′E

Naming
- English translation: Three Peaks, Three Merlons
- Language of name: Italian, German

Geography
- Location within Alps
- Location: Province of Belluno, Province of South Tyrol, Italy
- Country: Italy
- Regions: Veneto and Trentino-Alto Adige/Südtirol
- Parent range: Sexten Dolomites, Alps

Climbing
- First ascent: 21 August 1869 (Cima Grande/Große Zinne) by Paul Grohmann with guides Franz Innerkofler and Peter Salcher from south.

The Tre Cime di Lavaredo (Italian for 'Three Peaks of Lavaredo'; pronounced [ˌtre tˈtʃiːme di lavaˈreːdo]), also called the Drei Zinnen (German for 'Three Merlons') (pronounced [ˌdʁaɪ ˈtsɪnən]), are three distinctive battlement-like peaks, in the Sexten Dolomites of northeastern Italy. They are one of the best-known mountain groups in the Alps. The three peaks, from east to west, are:

- Cima Piccola / Kleine Zinne ("little peak")
- Cima Grande / Große Zinne ("big peak")
- Cima Ovest / Westliche Zinne ("western peak").

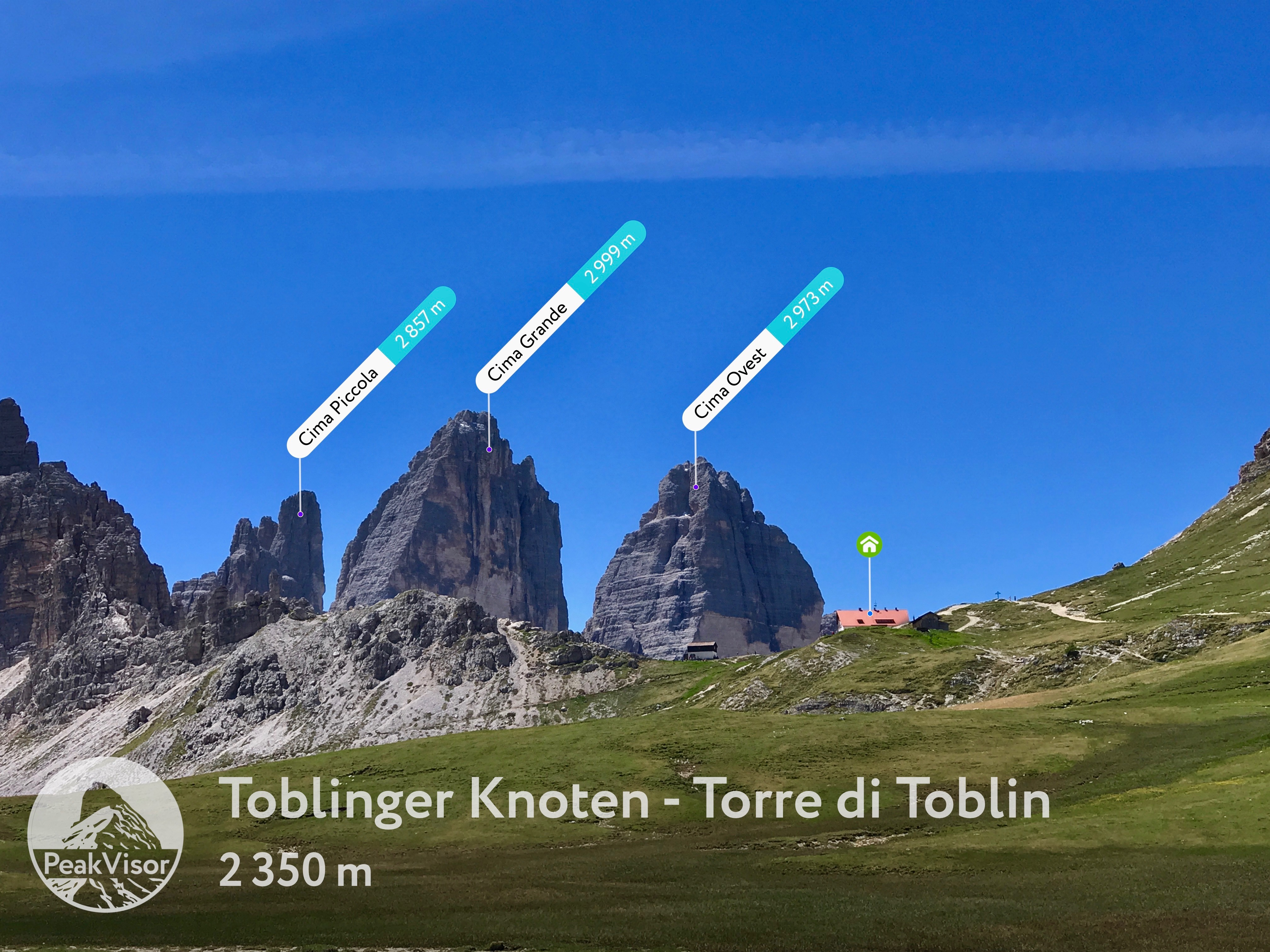
Tre Cime as seen from the foot of Torre di Toblin mountain

The peaks are composed of well-layered dolomites of the Dolomia Principale (Hauptdolomit) formation, Carnian to Rhaetian in age, as are many other groups in the Dolomites (e.g., the Tofane, the Pelmo or the Cinque Torri).

Until 1919 the peaks formed part of the border between Italy and Austria-Hungary. Now they lie on the border between the Italian provinces of South Tyrol and Belluno and still are a part of the linguistic boundary between German-speaking and Italian-speaking majorities. The Cima Grande has an elevation of 2,999 metres (9,839 ft). It stands between the Cima Piccola, at 2,857 metres (9,373 ft), and the Cima Ovest, at 2,973 metres (9,754 ft).

== Location and surroundings ==
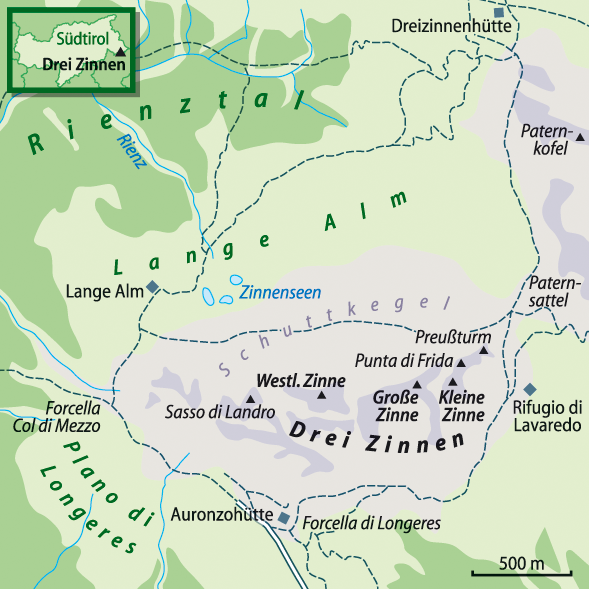
The Three Peaks and their surroundings

The Three Peaks rise on the southern edge of the extensive pinnacle plateau with the Langen Alm (La Grava Longa), an alpine plateau at around 2200 m to 2400 m, which here forms the end of the Rienz Valley (Valle della Rienza). There are three small mountain lakes, the Zinnenseen. This area north of the mountains, from the peaks to the municipality of Toblach in South Tyrol to the Natural Park of the Three Peaks (up to 2010, the Sesto Dolomites Nature Park), has been a UNESCO World Heritage site since 2009.

The ridge of the battlements, which runs in a west-east direction, forms the border with the municipality of Auronzo di Cadore in the province of Belluno, which also represents the German-Italian language border. To the northeast, this ridge continues to the 2454 m high Paternsattel (Forcella Lavaredo), where it turns north to the mountains Passportenkopf (Croda di Passaporto, 2719 m) and Paternkofel (Monte Paterno, 2744 m). In the west it sits across the Forcella Col di Mezzo (2315 m) transition to the Zinnenkuppe (Col di Mezzo, 2254 m) and on to the 2252 m high Katzenleiterkopf (Croda d'Arghena).

To the southwest of the Drei Zinnen, the Forcella Col di Mezzo is followed by the Plano di Longeres plateau above the Valle di Rinbianco, a side valley of the Rienz Valley. Immediately south of the western pinnacle, the Forcella di Longeres saddle (2235 m) separates the Plano di Longeres from the Vallone di Lavaredo, a side valley of the Piave valley. To the south lies the Cadini group.

Cortina d'Ampezzo, 17 kilometers southwest, is the largest city in the area. Other larger towns are Toblach 13 kilometers northwest and Innichen 12 kilometers north.

== Cabins and access ==
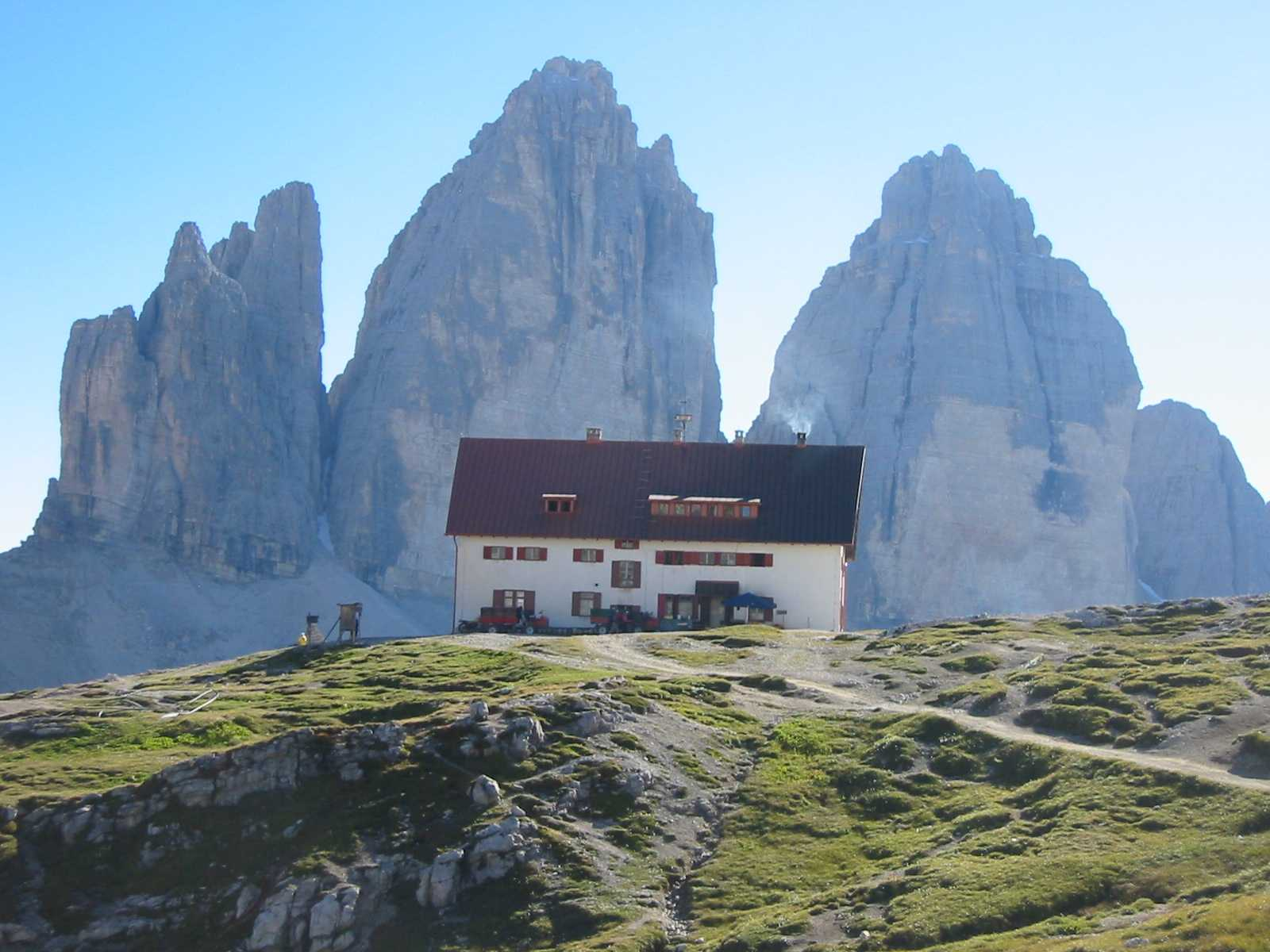
Dreizinnenhütte in front of the north side of Drei Zinnen

The most easily accessible support point around Drei Zinnen is Rifugio Auronzo (Auronzo hut, 2320 m). The cottage, which belongs to the Club Alpino Italiano (the Italian Alpine Club, CAI), is located immediately south of the massif above Forcella di Longeres, and has good road connections to the tourist resort of Misurina (toll road). The cabin can be reached on foot from Lavaredodalen in the southeast.

About one kilometer east of Rifugio Auronzo and from there via a wide hiking trail lies the privately run Rifugio di Lavaredo (2325 m) at the southeast foot of the Kleine Zinne.

Northwest of the peaks is the summer-open, privately run farmhouse Lange Alm (also Lange Alpe) at 2296 m. One hiking trail goes from the Auronzo hut over the Forcella Col di Mezzo, another from the north comes from the Rienztal.

CAI's Dreizinnenhütte (Rifugio Locatelli, 2438 m) is located approximately one kilometer northeast of Drei Zinnen. The cabin, which is well known for its view of the north wall, can be reached from Auronzohytta via Paternsattel on a wide hiking trail. Other access options are from Sexten through Fischleinboden from the east, and also from Sexten from the north through the Innerfeldtal and through the Rienztal from Höhlenstein (Landro) in the Höhlensteintal (Valle di Landro). From the southeast, the cabin can be reached from Lange Alm.

== Climate, flora and fauna ==
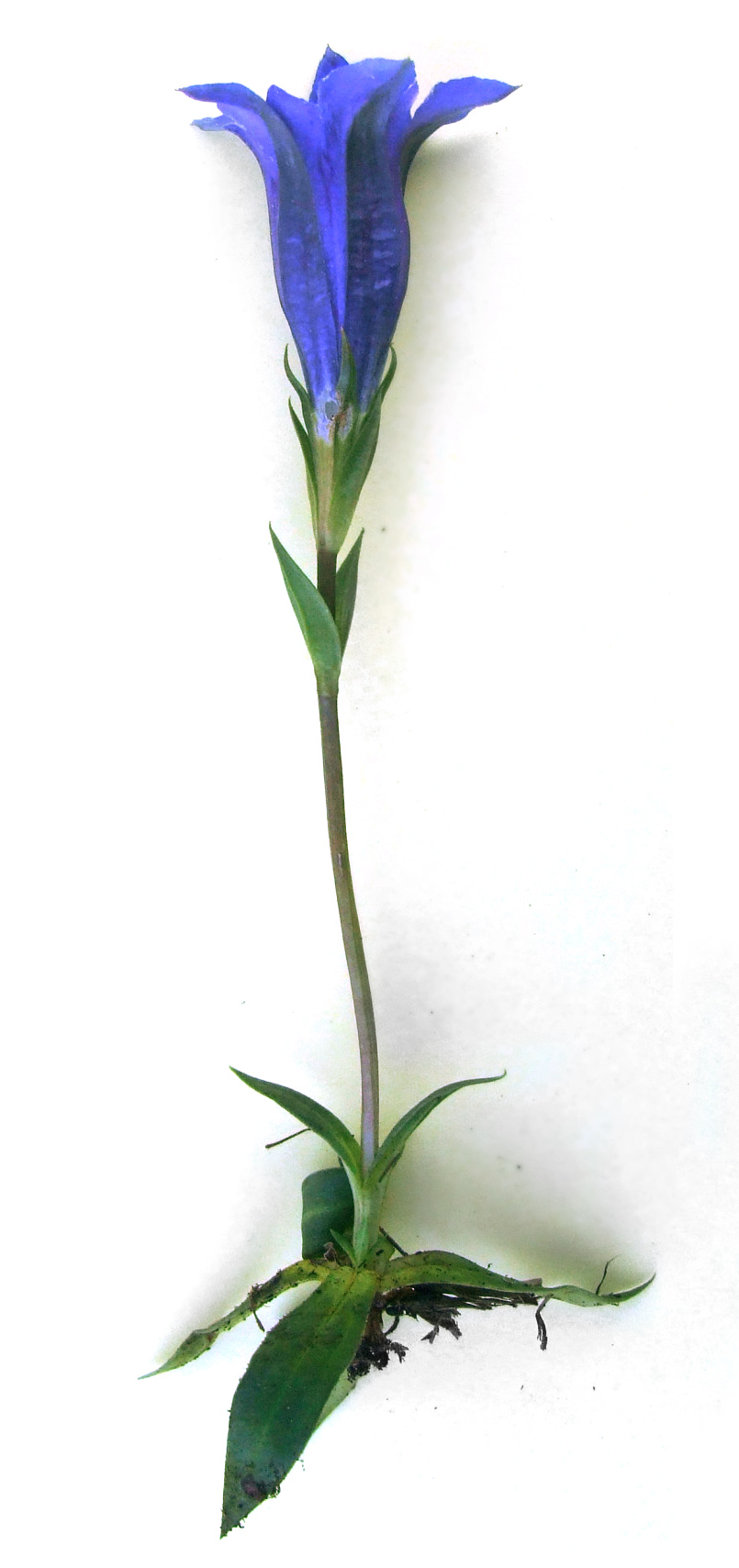
Gentiana clusii

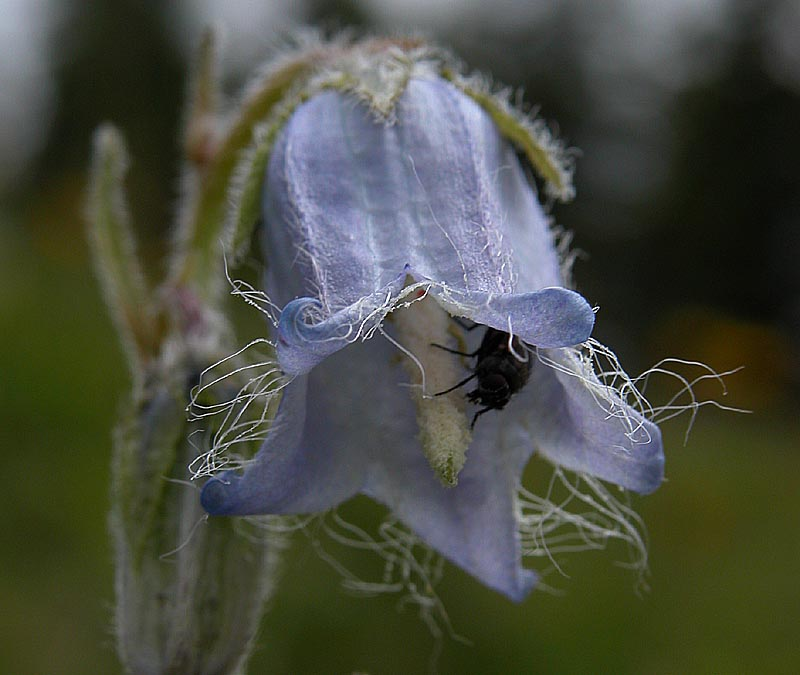
Campanula barbata

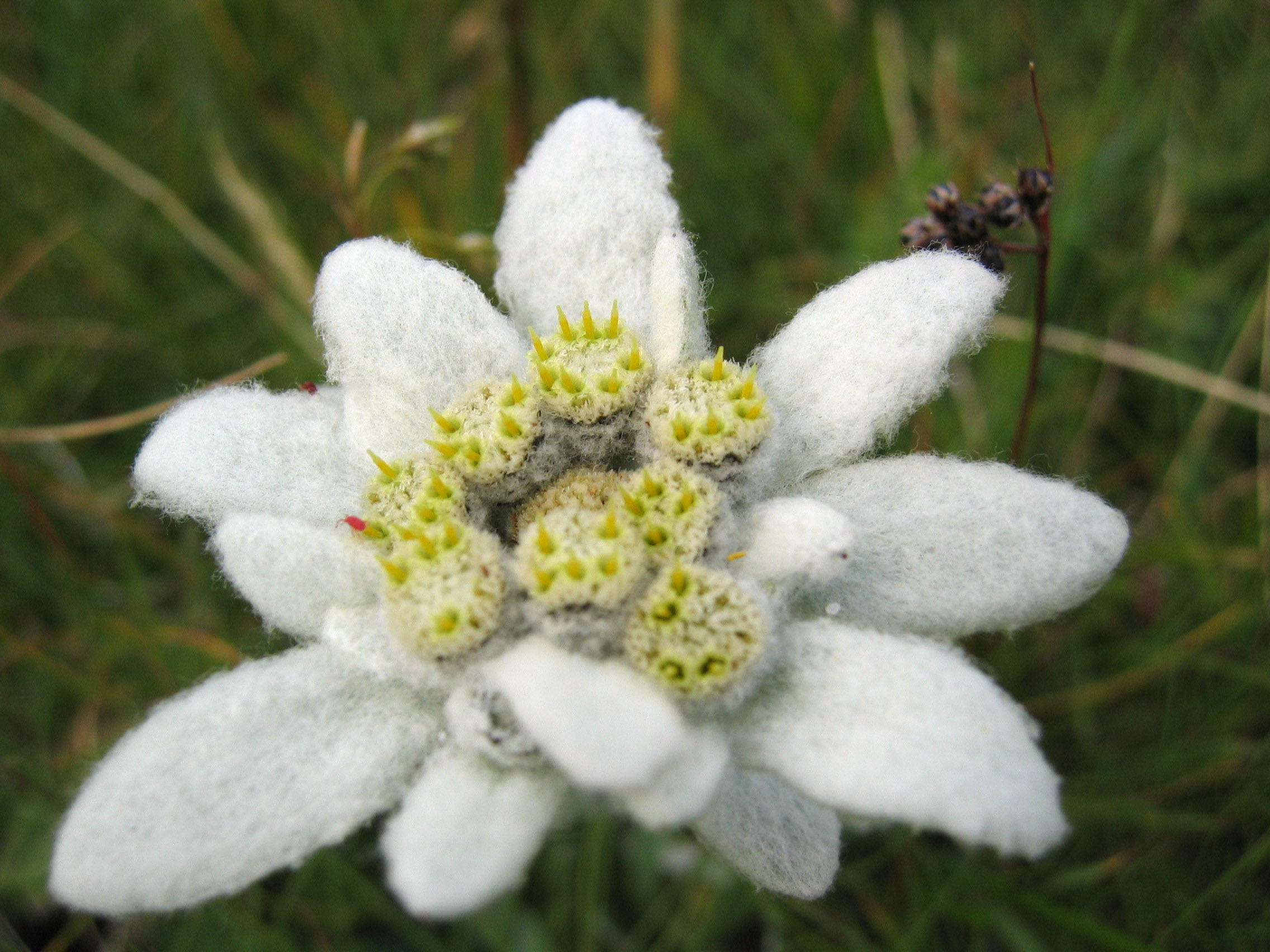
Edelweiss

The Sexten Dolomites are surrounded by other mountain ranges on all sides, and this sheltered location in the interior of the Alps provides relatively favorable climatic conditions considering the altitude. Nevertheless, when cold fronts pass the area, rapid weather changes with fog, wind and heavy rainfall can occur, even as snow, even in high summer. In shady gorges and under north walls, the snow can lie until late summer, sometimes all year round, even though there are no glaciers here.

The alpine vegetation zone around Drei Zinnen is dominated by the Raibl layer's alpine mats. The plateau around Lange Alm is one of the few areas with grazing land in the nature park. Alpines are strikingly flowery; examples of plants that thrive here are beard bell, edelweiss and Gentiana clusii. The alpine marmot is a numerous mammal; there are also hares and chamois. On the other hand, there are no ibex in the Sexten Dolomites. Of birds there are rock ptarmigan, ravens and golden eagles, and also hubris can often be found hunting at this altitude. Vipers, especially the black variety, can be found at the unusual (for reptiles) altitude of 2600 m.

The vegetation on the vast scree slopes and on the southern flanks of the peaks is characterized by plants that are able to adapt to the constant movements of the scree. Examples of these are alpine cod mouth (Linaria alpina), French sorrel (Rumex scutatus), Thlaspi cepaeifolium, Potentilla nitida and Alpine poppy (Papaver alpinum). In crevices are trickled Saxifraga squarrosa, cruciferous Kernera saxatilis, carnation Minuartia sedoides and the rare Paederota bonarota. In the steep, shady north walls there are hardly any vascular plants; the most conspicuous vegetation is next to moss and low large carpets with blue-green bacteria, which appear especially on moist rock walls in the form of characteristic «ink lines». A mammal that moves all the way into the cliff areas is the snow field mouse (Chionomys nivalis). Wallcreepers (Tichodroma muraria) and Alpine choughs (Pyrrhocorax graculus), two bird species adapted to high mountain habitats, hunt insects here.

== First ascents ==
The first ascent of the Cima Grande (Große Zinne) was on 21 August 1869 by Paul Grohmann with guides Franz Innerkofler and Peter Salcher. The Cima Ovest (Westliche Zinne) was first climbed exactly ten years later, on 21 August 1879, by Michel Innerkofler with G. Ploner, a tourist. The Cima Piccola (Kleine Zinne) was first climbed on 25 July 1881 by Michel and Hans Innerkofler. The routes of these three first ascents are still the normal ascent routes; the Cima Piccola's route is the most difficult of the three. A climbing route, the Dibona Kante, on the Cima Grande is named after Angelo Dibona.

Emilio Comici was the first to climb the north face of the Cima Grande in 1933 in a party of three, after an ascent time of 3 days and 2 nights. This partly overhanging northern face is considered by climbers to be one of the great north faces of the Alps.

== Tourism ==
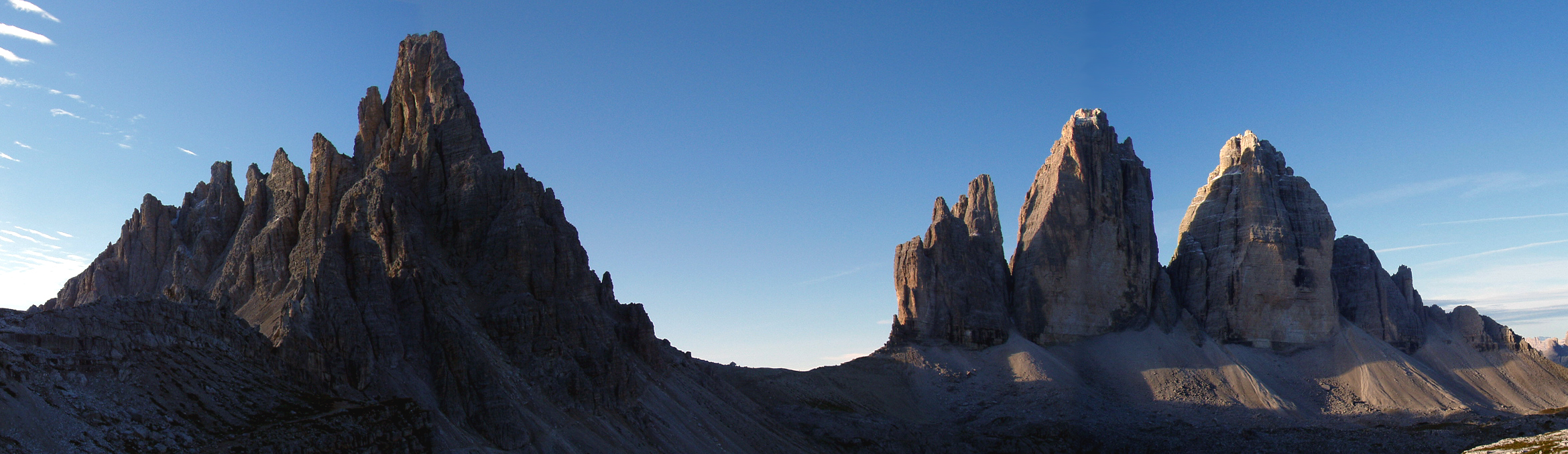
View of Paternkofel/Monte Paterno (left) and the Tre Cime

Tre Cime Natural Park is named after the famous peaks. The visitor centre provides information concerning the trails, natural and man-made landscapes of the Sexten Dolomites and it is located at the former Grand Hotel in Dobbiaco.

Numerous well-marked routes lead from the surrounding communities to and around the peaks. The most common route is from Paternkofel/Monte Paterno to the alpine hut Auronzo at 2,333 m (7,654 ft), over Paternsattel (Patern Pass) to the Locatelli alpine hut (Dreizinnenhütte) at 2,405 m (7,890 ft), and then to the peaks. There are a number of other routes as well.

Nearby communities include Auronzo di Cadore (in the province of Belluno, region of Veneto), Toblach/Dobbiaco, Sexten/Sesto, and the Puster Valley (in the province of Bolzano, region of Trentino-Alto Adige/Südtirol).

The area has also staged many finishes in Giro d'Italia.

== History ==
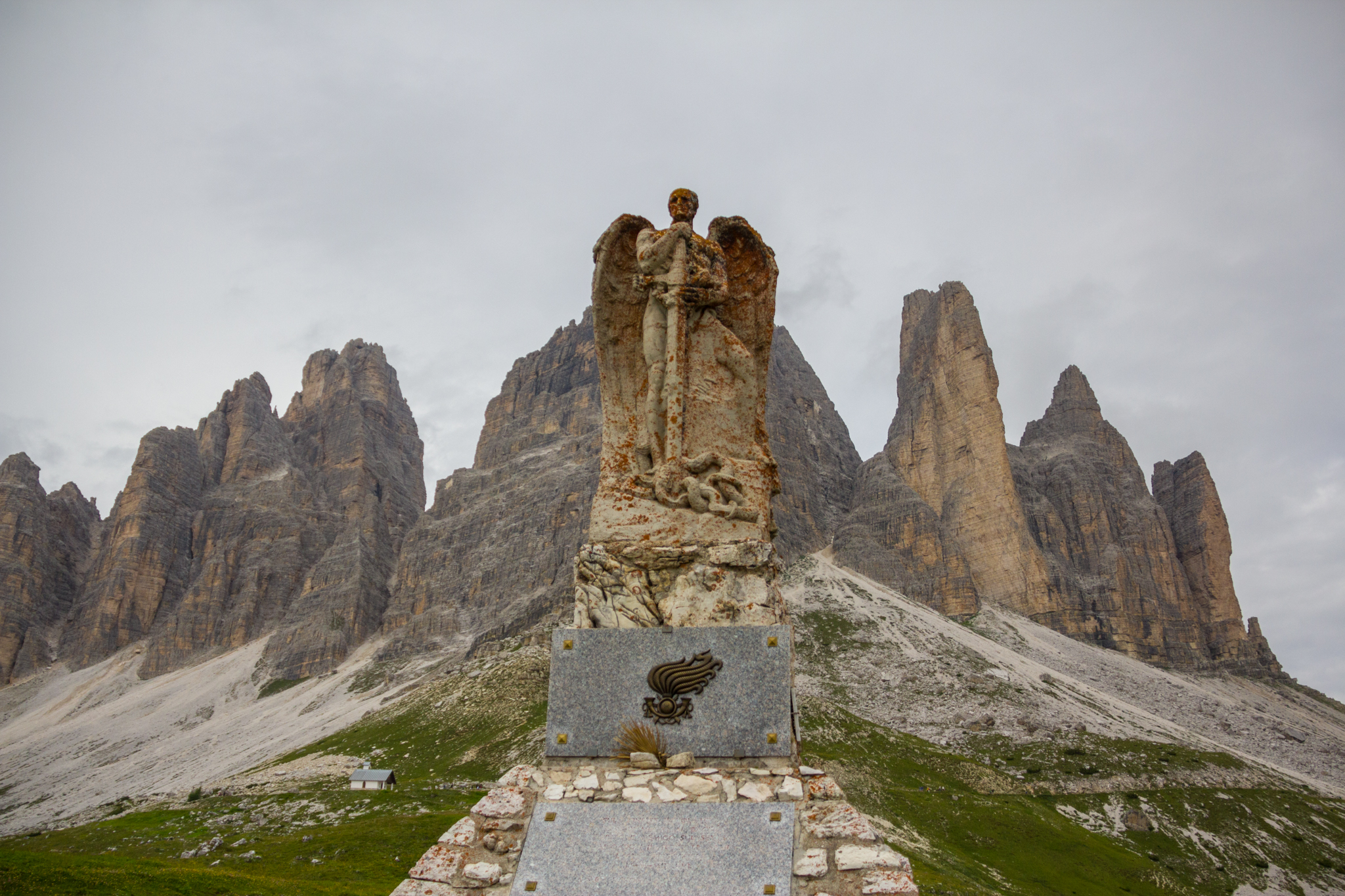
Monument to Bersaglieri ("marksmen") at Tre Cime di Lavaredo

Since the front line between Italy and Austria-Hungary during World War I ran through the Tre Cime peaks, there are a number of fortifications, trenches, tunnels, iron ladders, and commemorative plaques in the area. There was intense fighting throughout the so-called "White War" between 1915 and 1917.

== Film and television appearances ==
Tre Cime has been used as a filming location for:

- The Young Indiana Jones Chronicles
- Solo: A Star Wars Story

== Gallery ==
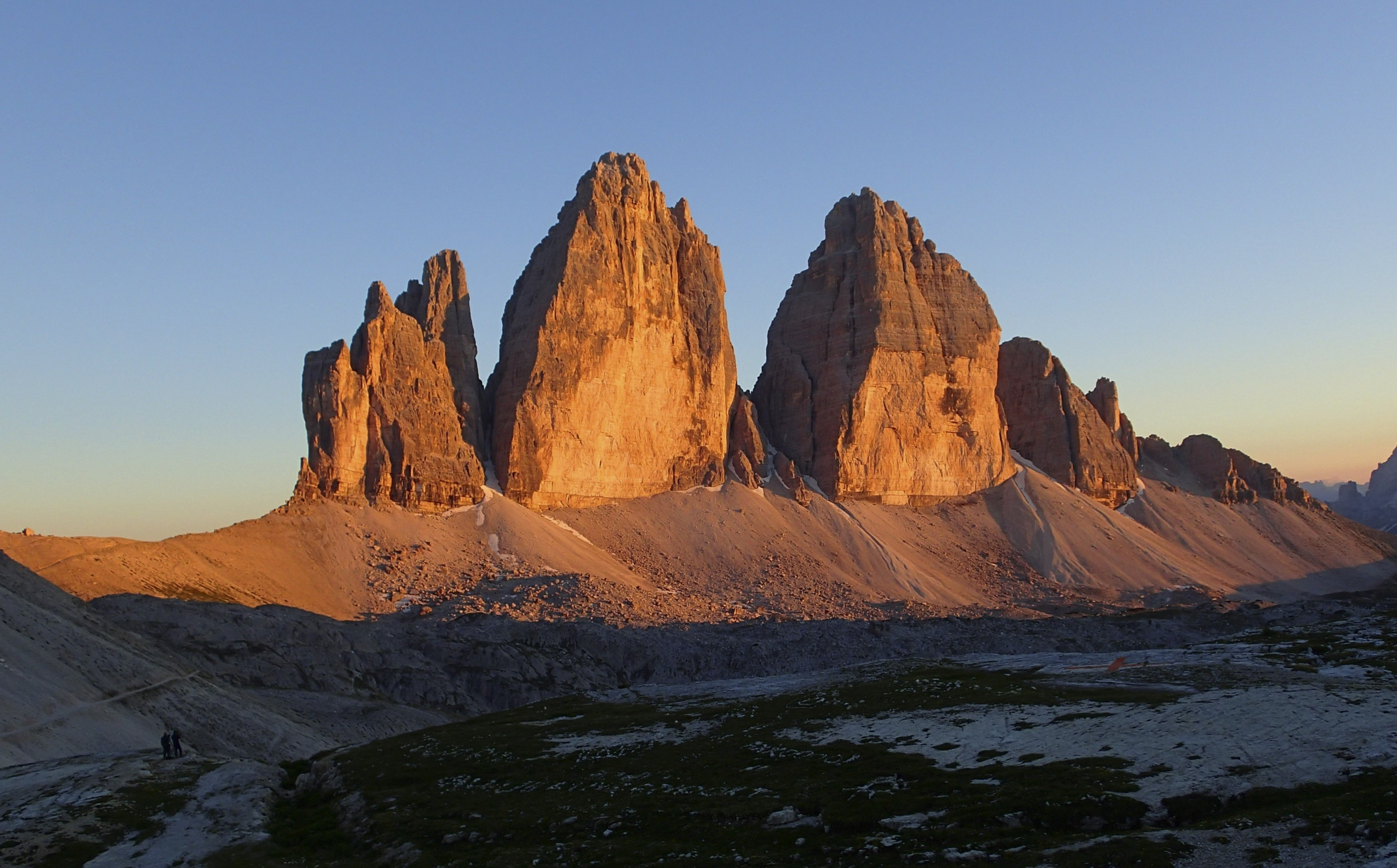
Sunset on the Tre Cime

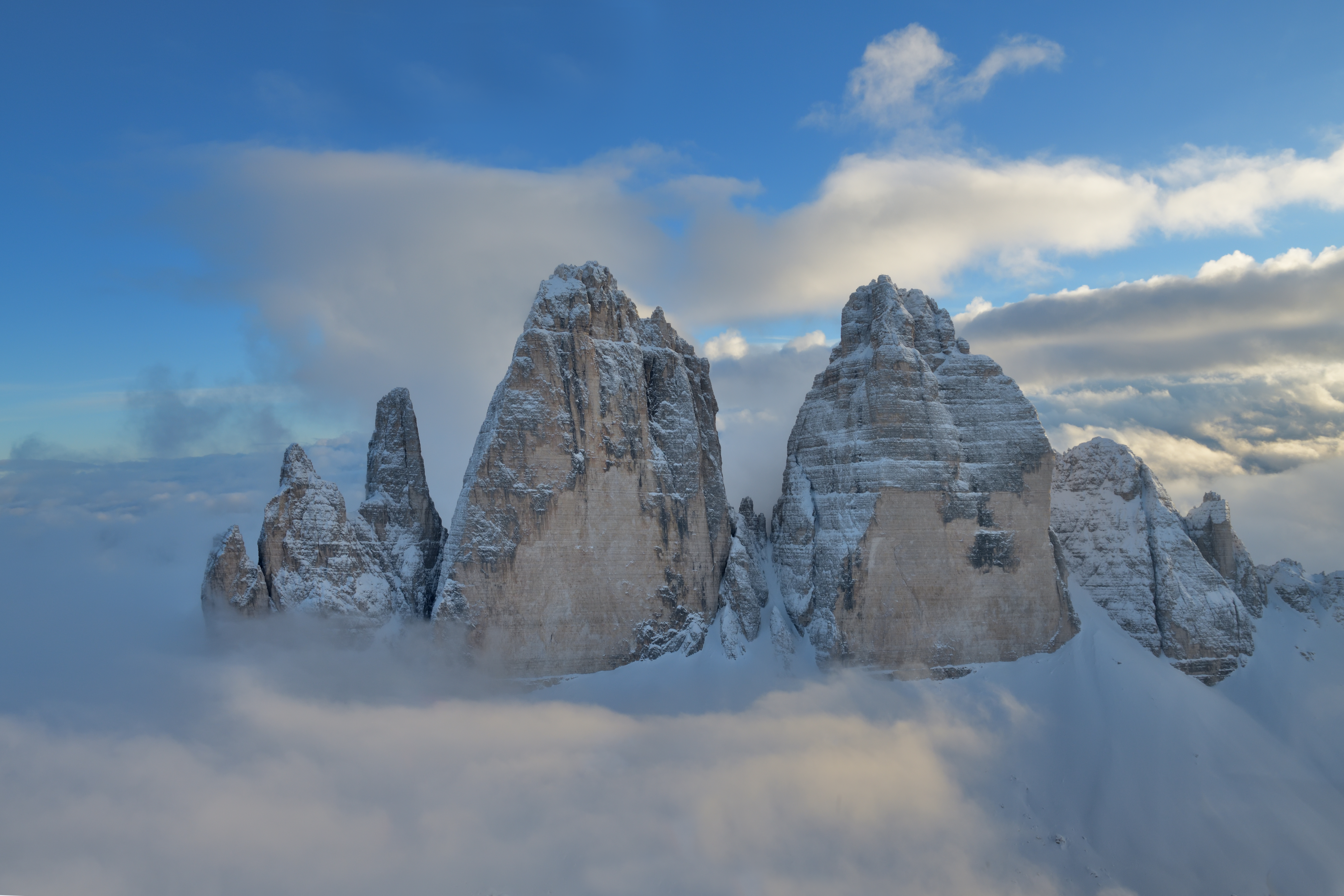
Aerial view of the Northern face

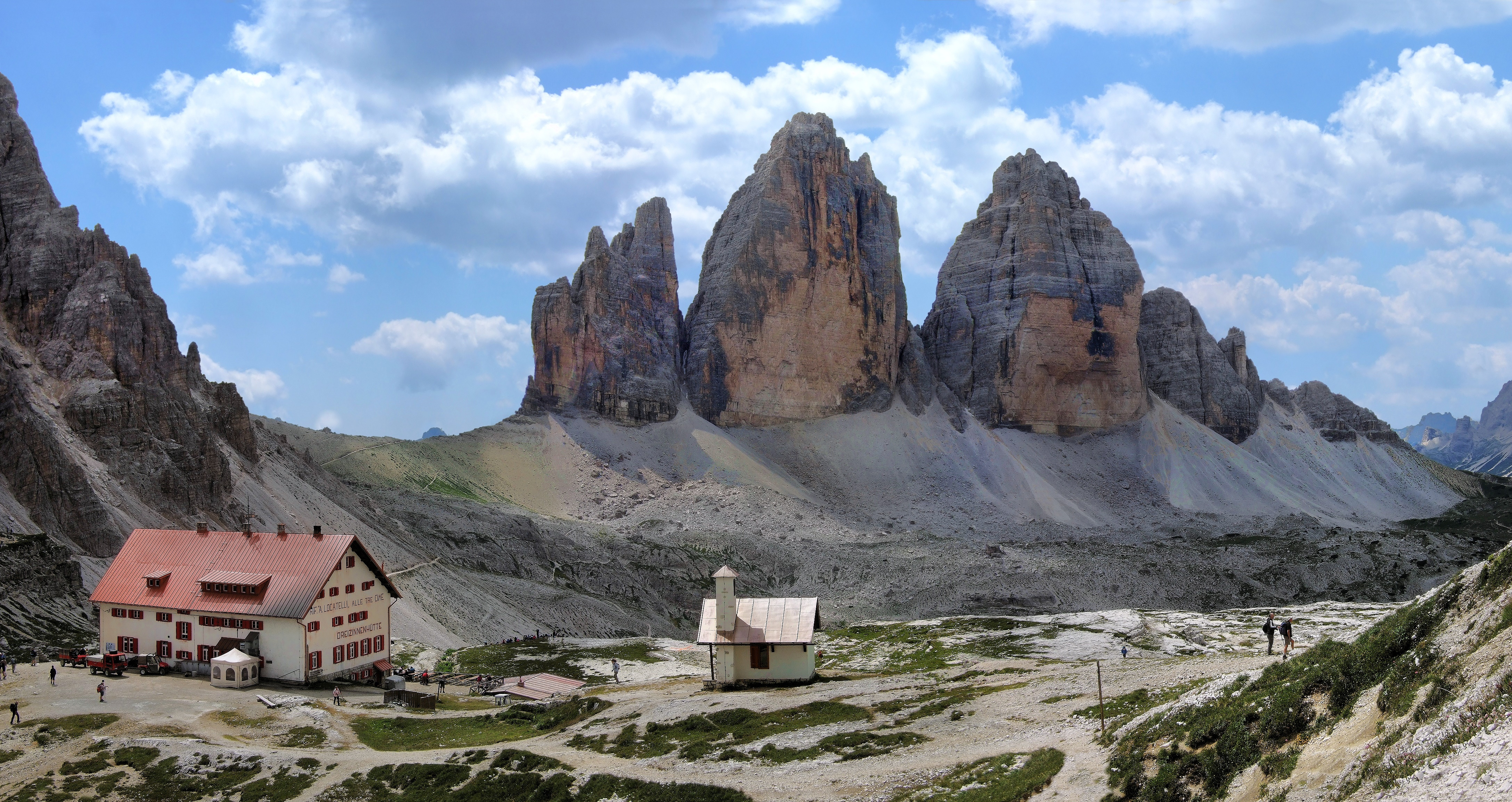
The Locatelli hut with a small chapel

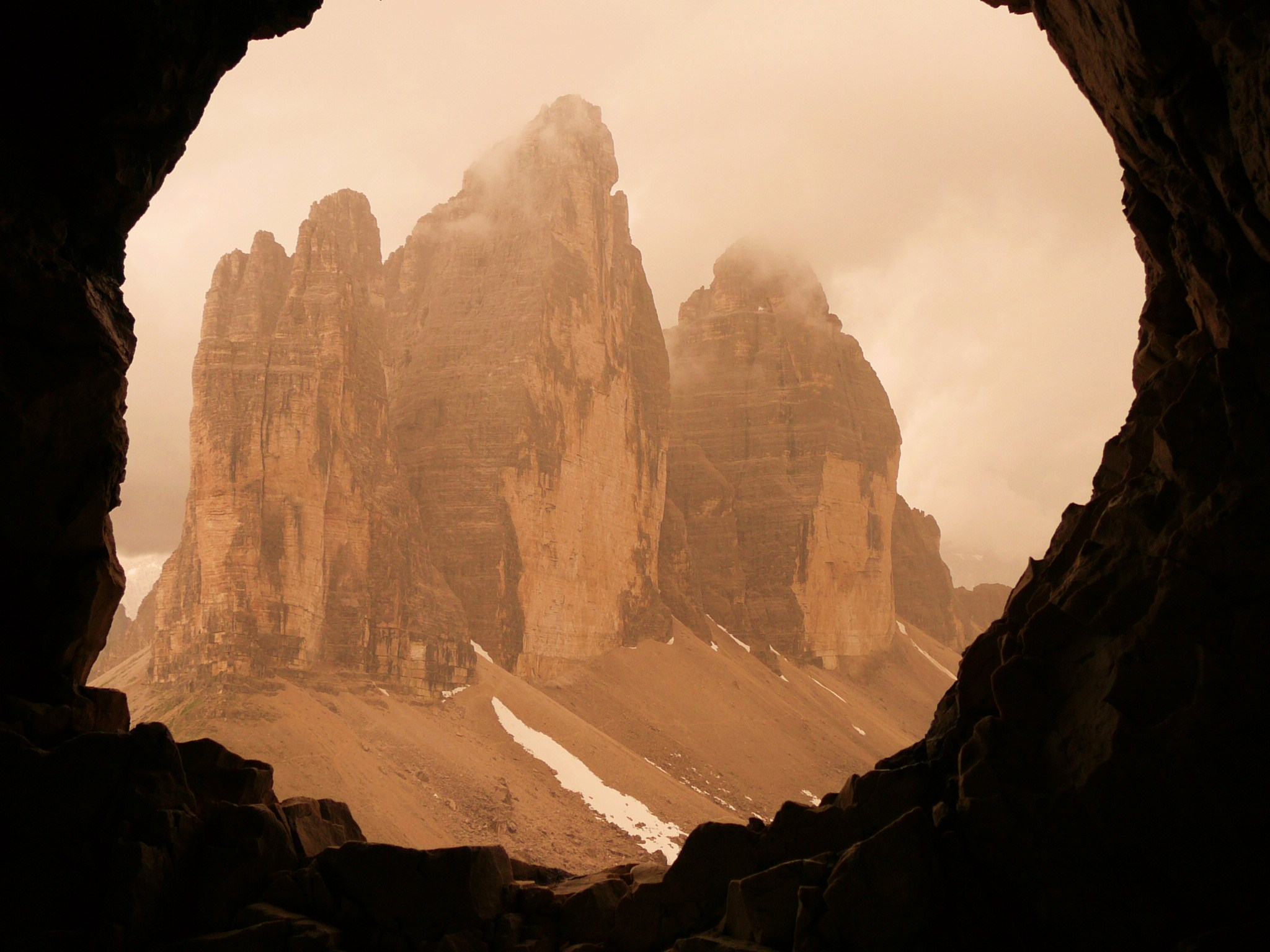
View from Monte Paterno

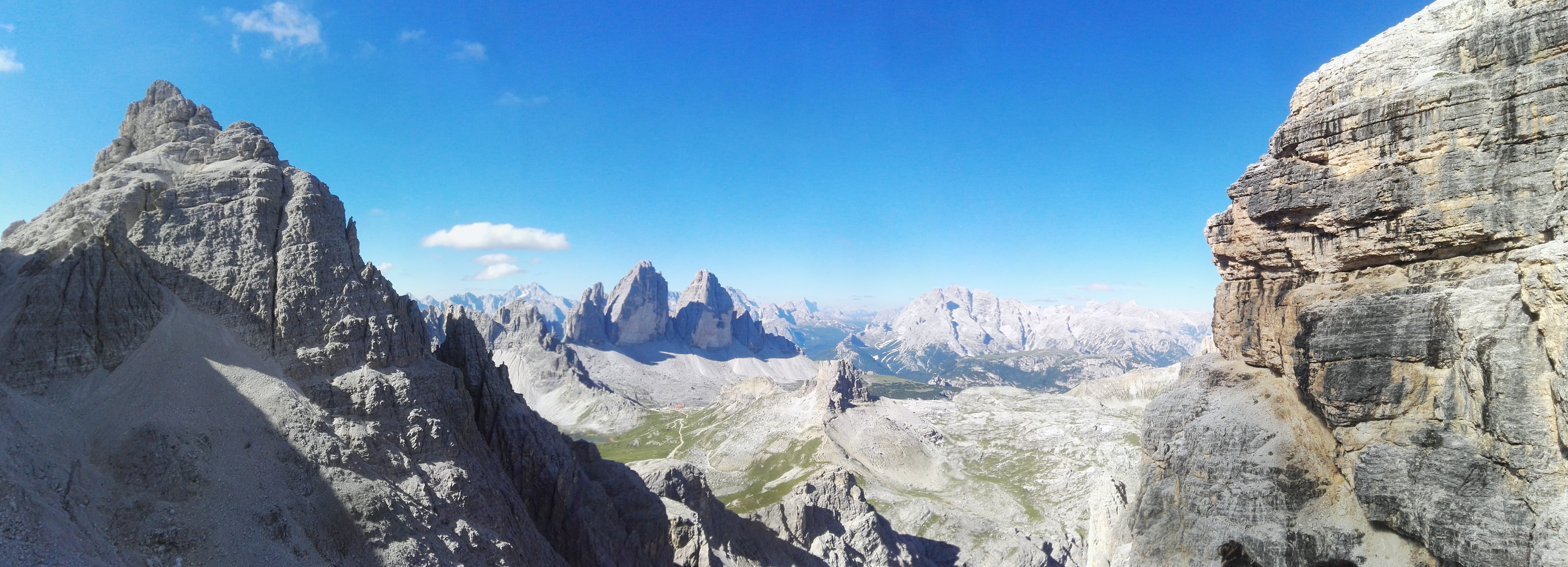
Crodon di San Candido, Tre Cime, Torre di Toblin, side of Lastron dei Scarperi

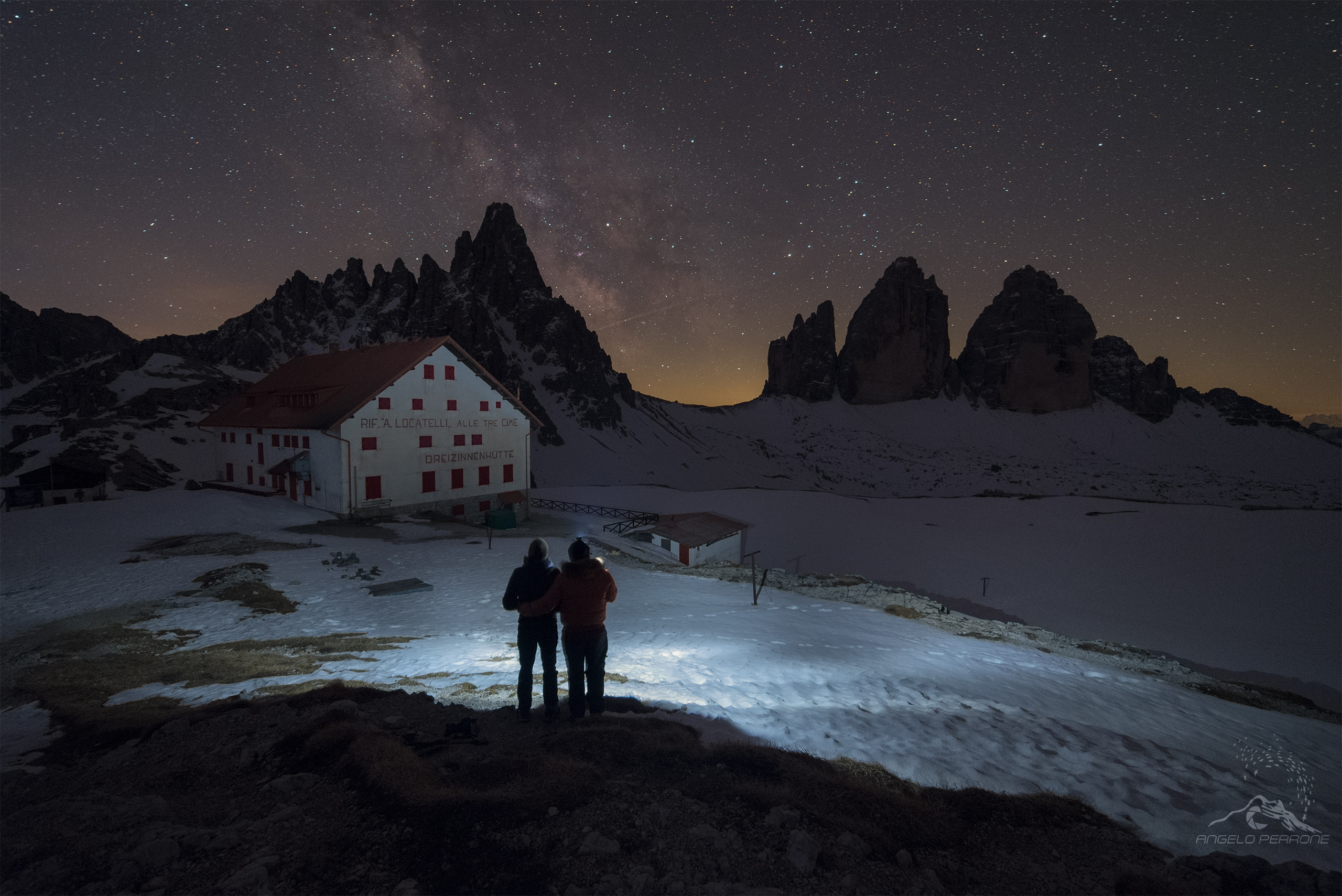
Night view at the Locatelli hut

== See also ==
- Italian front (World War I)
- List of highest paved roads in Europe
- List of mountain passes
- Lake Misurina
- Silver age of alpinism
- White War

== Sources ==
- Huber, Alexander; Willi Schwenkmeier (2003). Drei Zinnen. Bergverlag Rother. ISBN 3-7633-7513-9.
- Schemfil, Viktor (1984). Die Kämpfe im Drei-Zinnen-Gebiet und am Kreuzberg bei Sexten 1915-1917. Universitätsverlag Wagner. ISBN 3-7030-0170-4.
- Goedeke, Richard (1988). Sextener Dolomiten. (Alpenvereinsführer) Bergverlag Rother. ISBN 3-7633-1255-2.
- Diener, Carl (1894). Richter, Eduard (ed.). Die Sextener Gruppe. Die Erschließung der Ostalpen. Vol. 3. Berlin: Verlag des Deutschen und Österreichischen Alpenvereins fur Deutscher und Österreichischer Alpenverein.
- Dumler, Helmut (1968). Drei Zinnen. Menschen - Berge - Abenteuer. München: F. Bruckmann.
- Edwards, Amelia (1873). Untrodden peaks and unfrequented valleys. A midsummer ramble in the Dolomites. London: Longman's, Green and Co.
- Eppacher, Wilhelm (1957). Klebelsberg, Raimund (ed.). Berg- und Gipfelkreuze in Tirol. Schlern-Schriften. Vol. 178. Innsbruck: Universitätsverlag Wagner.
- Erhard, Heinrich, ed. (2000). Das Steinwild in Südtirol. Autonome Provinz Bozen, Amt für Jagd und Fischerei, Abteilung Forstwirtschaft. Bozen: Athesia. ISBN 88-8266-073-7.
- Goedeke, Richard (1988). Sextener Dolomiten. München: Bergverlag Rother (Alpenvereinsführer). ISBN 3-7633-1255-2.
- Grohmann, Paul (1927). Die Ersteigung der Großen (mittleren) Zinne. Paul Grohmann – Erschließer der Berge. München: Anton Ziegler.
- Haydn, Alois; Goedeke, Richard (1986). Sextener Dolomiten, Gebietsführer für Wanderer u. Bergsteiger. München: Rother. ISBN 3-7633-3336-3.
- Holzer, Anton (1996). Die Bewaffnung des Auges. Die Drei Zinnen oder Eine kleine Geschichte vom Blick auf das Gebirge. Wien: Turia & Kant. ISBN 3-85132-094-8.
- Huber, Alexander; Meisl, Michael (2007). Pan Aroma. Bergsteiger. Vol. 11. Frei durch das größte Dach der Alpen. München: Bruckmann.
- Huber, Alexander; Schwenkmeier, Willi (2003). Drei Zinnen. München: Bergverlag Rother.
- Kühebacher, Egon (2000). Die Ortsnamen Südtirols und ihre Geschichte. 3. Bozen. ISBN 8882660184.
- Kübler, Peter; Reider, Hugo (1992). Kampf um die Drei Zinnen. Das Herzstück der Sextener Dolomiten 1915–1917 und heute (4 ed.). Bozen: Athesia. ISBN 88-7014-231-0.
- Maurer, Annemarie; Pallhuber, Margareth; Lanthaler, Ulrike (2004). Naturparke in Südtirol, Naturerlebnis drinnen und draußen. Autonome Provinz Bozen-Südtirol Abteilung Natur und Landschaft.
- Ortner, Peter; Kiebacher, Christine; Gruber, Alfred (2001). Autonome Provinz Bozen-Südtirol, Abteilung Natur und Landschaft (ed.). Naturpark Sextener Dolomiten - Die Einsamkeit großer Namen. Bozen: Athesia.
- Schemfil, Viktor (1984). Die Kämpfe im Drei-Zinnen-Gebiet und am Kreuzberg bei Sexten 1915-1917. Universitätsverlag Wagner. ISBN 3-7030-0170-4.
- Stahr, Alexander; Hartmann, Thomas (1999). Landschaftsformen und Landschaftselemente im Hochgebirge. Berlin: Springer. ISBN 3-540-65278-7.
- Stingl, Volkmar; Wachtler, Michael (1999). Dolomiten – das Werden einer Landschaft. Naturmuseum Südtirol (2 ed.). Bozen: Athesia. ISBN 88-7014-979-X.
- Visentini, Luca (1983). Sextener Dolomiten. Bozen: Athesia. ISBN 88-7014-319-8.
