= Dvornik =

Dvornik or Dvorník is a surname. Notable people with the name include:

- Aljaž Dvornik (born 1995), former Slovenian alpine skier
- Boris Dvornik (1939–2008), Croatian actor
- Dino Dvornik (1964–2008), Croatian singer, songwriter, music producer and actor
- Francis Dvornik (1893–1975), Czech priest and academic
- Igor Dvornik (1923–2010), Croatian radiation chemist
- Josef Dvorník (born 1978), Czech football player
- Neja Dvornik (born 2001), Slovenian alpine skier
