= Erazmo Tićac =

Croatian shipbuilding engineer

Erazmo Bernard Tićac (1904 in Žurkovo – 1968) was a Croatian shipbuilding engineer from Žurkovo near Kostrena. He worked for an American Design Company George G. Sharp Inc. He is well known for being the main ship design engineer of NS Savannah, the first commercial, passenger-cargo ship of nuclear power.

== See also ==
- List of Croatian inventors
