= Peter Salcher =

Austrian physicist (1848–1928)

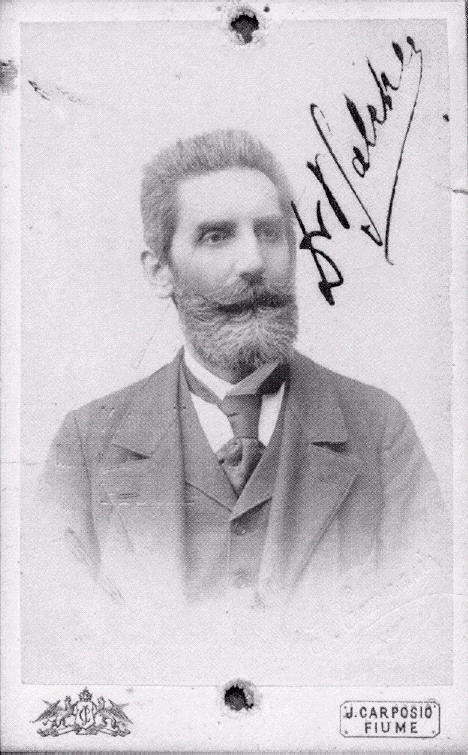
Peter Salcher

Peter Salcher (Kreuzen, 10 August 1848 — Sušak, today part of Rijeka, 4 October 1928) was an Austrian and Croatian physicist.

== Biography ==
He studied physics at the University of Graz, where he received his doctorate in 1872. After gaining his doctorate, he worked at the grammar school in Klagenfurt, then in Trieste, and 1875 he came to the Imperial and Royal Naval Academy in Fiume as professor of physics and mechanics and as leader of the physics laboratory; From 1880 he also ran a meteorological station. The Naval Academy was then one of the top higher education and research institutions of Austria-Hungary, with carefully selected staff, and was excellently equipped. During his tenure at the Academy, one of Salcher's students was Georg von Trapp, one of the most highly decorated officers of the Austro-Hungarian Navy in World War I and patriarch of the Trapp Family singers, inspiration for the movie The Sound of Music. At the request of Ernst Mach, who has not managed to experimentally prove his shockwave theory, Salcher and his assistant Sandor Riegler, who was then a professor of chemistry and physics at the Rijeka Higher Commercial School, conceived in 1886 an experiment where he managed to record the flight of a projectile shot from a firearm for the first time in history using a specially devised ultra-fast photography technique. The recording was done using a method invented in 1859-64 by August Toepler, Salcher's professor from Graz. The short exposure was achieved using an electric spark, and a total of 80 shots were recorded. Salcher, in collaboration with Ernst Mach, published the results of this experiment in the 1887 paper entitled "Photographic recording of phenomena caused by the flight of projectiles through the air" (German: Photographische Fixirung der durch Projectile in der Luft eingeleiteten Vorgänge).

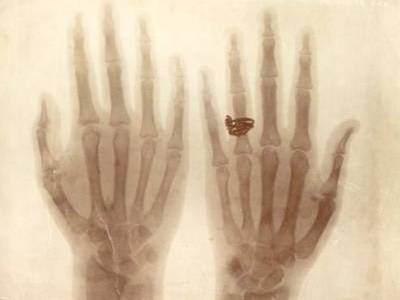
X-ray image of baroness Josephina Mollinary-Vranyczany's hands created by Salcher on 21 February 1896

Further, developing his ideas Salcher continued with his experiments and in 1887, in collaboration with John Whitehead (Robert Whitehead's son) he photographed the superficial occurrences of air leakage from high pressure tanks in the Rijeka torpedo factory. Today, it is considered that these experiments were a major breakthrough in the development of modern aerodynamic tunnels testing. One month after the first Röntgen trial in 1896, Salcher demonstrated the use of X-ray in a public lecture in Rijeka. Soon after that, the X-ray device began to be used at the Rijeka City Hospital. Salcher was one of the most prominent figures in Rijeka's scientific and cultural life, a lecturer and author of textbooks, scientific and popular articles, an active member of the Rijeka Natural Science Club and a prominent photojournalist. He died in Rijeka in 1928.

== See also ==
- High-speed photography
- List of Croatian inventors
