= Antonio Locatelli Hut =

Alpine refuge

Antonio Locatelli Hut Dreizinnenhütte
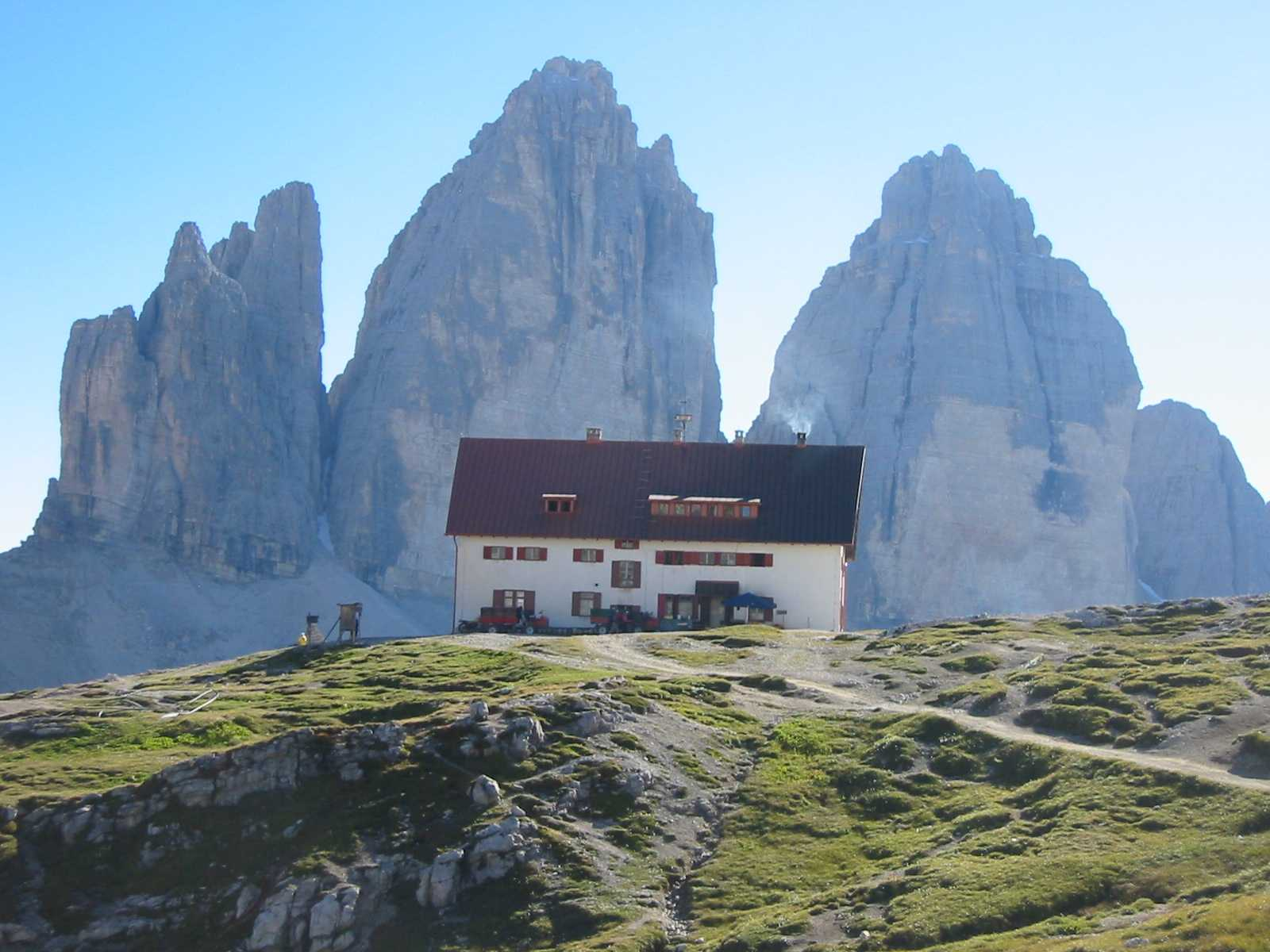
- The Antonio Locatelli Hut, in front of the Tre cime di Lavaredo
- Interactive map of the Antonio Locatelli Hut; Dreizinnenhütte area

General information
- Coordinates: 46°38′13″N 12°18′38″E
- Elevation: 2,405 m (7,890 ft)
- Owner: Italian Alpine Club of Padua

The Antonio Locatelli hut (German: Dreizinnenhütte, literally "three peaks' hut") is a mountain refuge located in the Tre Cime Natural Park in Alto Adige-South Tyrol, Italy. It sits at an altitude of 2,405 meters (7,890 feet).

== Toponymy ==
The Antonio Locatelli hut (German: Dreizinnenhütte) is named after Antonio Locatelli who was born in Bergamo on April 17, 1895. He was a highly decorated aviator, the only Italian soldier to receive three gold medals for military valor. Locatelli was also a journalist, politician, mountaineer, and the president of the Club Alpino Italiano (CAI) of Bergamo at the time of his death.

Locatelli's career included significant contributions during the First World War as a pilot in military aviation. His exploits, such as participating in the famous flight over Vienna with D'Annunzio, made him a well-known figure. Despite being shot down and captured on September 15, 1918, Locatelli managed to escape after a few weeks, disguised as an Austrian soldier. Locatelli died on June 27, 1936, in the Lechemti massacre during the Ethiopian War. To honor his memory, a statue of the Virgin of Loreto, the patron saint of airmen, is housed inside the refuge. The hut, located in the Tre Cime Natural Park in Alto Adige-South Tyrol, stands as a tribute to his life and achievements.

== History ==
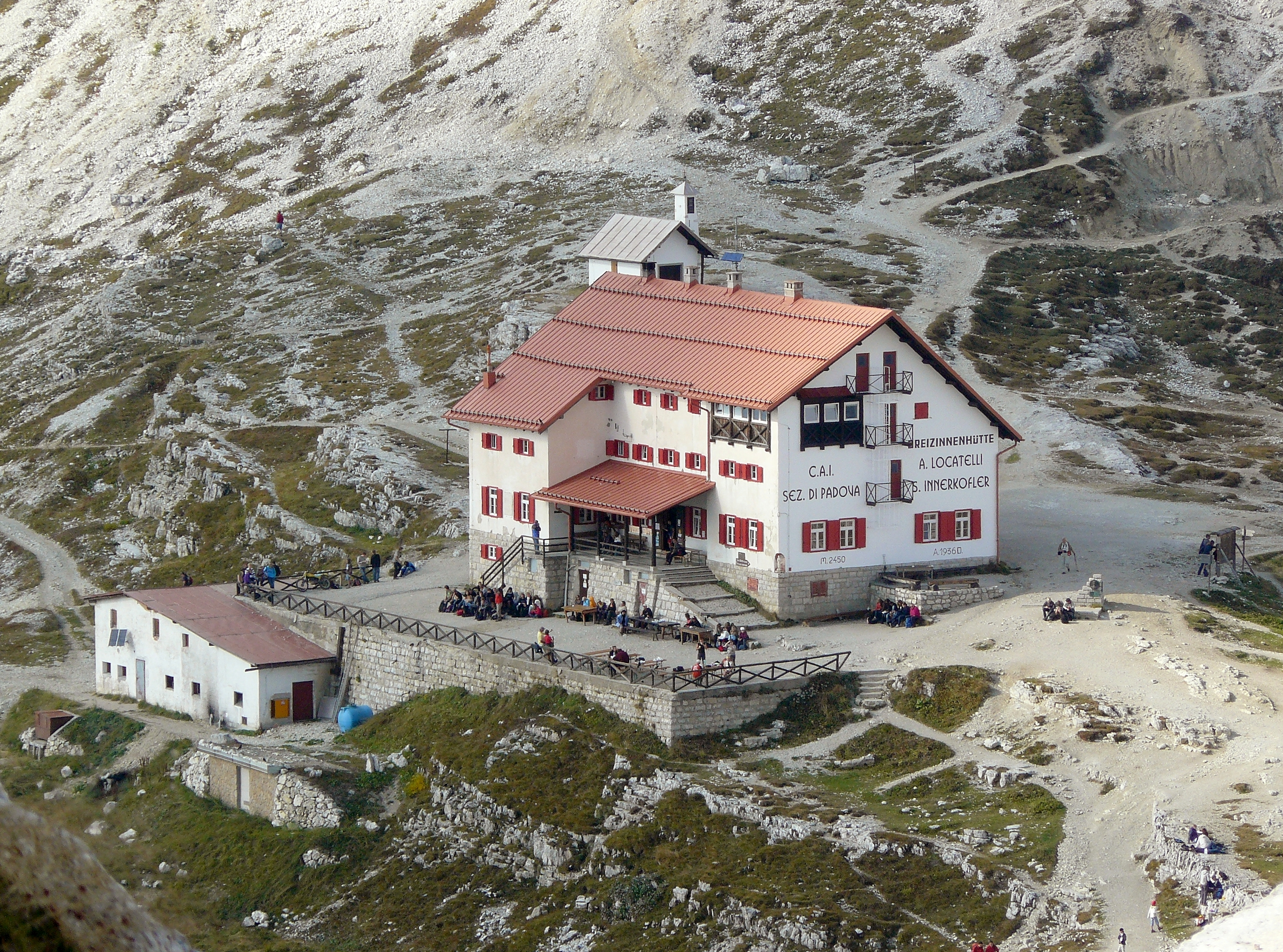
View of the Locatelli refuge and the little chapel just behind.

In 1881, Karl Stemberger, the owner of the Post Hotel in Sexten, proposed the construction of a refuge for the Deutscher und Österreichischer Alpenverein, (the German and Austrian Alpine Club) near the Toblin pass. The members of the club were captivated by the panoramic views of the Tre Cime di Lavaredo, Mount Paterno, and the surrounding mountains. Motivated by the breathtaking scenery, they decided to build the shelter at the pass.

Karl Stemberger oversaw the construction work, while the project was designed by the president of the section, engineer Rienzner from Toblach. The work began in the spring of 1882. In two months, the equipment was available, and a simple one-storey building was installed, built with cut stones and a sloping roof.

The ground floor of the small shelter included an equipped room with an integrated kitchen, two tables, benches, and chairs. Adjacent to this main room was a door leading to a second room, which served as sleeping quarters for the shepherds. An external staircase on the east side of the building provided access to the attic, which contained up to ten beds.

The shelter was to be open for autumn, but the weather was not favorable. In fact, in September 1882, a flood occurred in the upper Puster Valley. The inauguration was then postponed to 1883. For its realization, 1,250 florins were spent.

The refuge was destroyed during the First World War by an Italian grenade.

In 1922, a small refuge was rebuilt in place of the previous by the South Tyrol Alpine Club. In 1923, the refuge was expropriated in favor of the CAI section of Padua, which planned a major restoration and expansion in 1935.

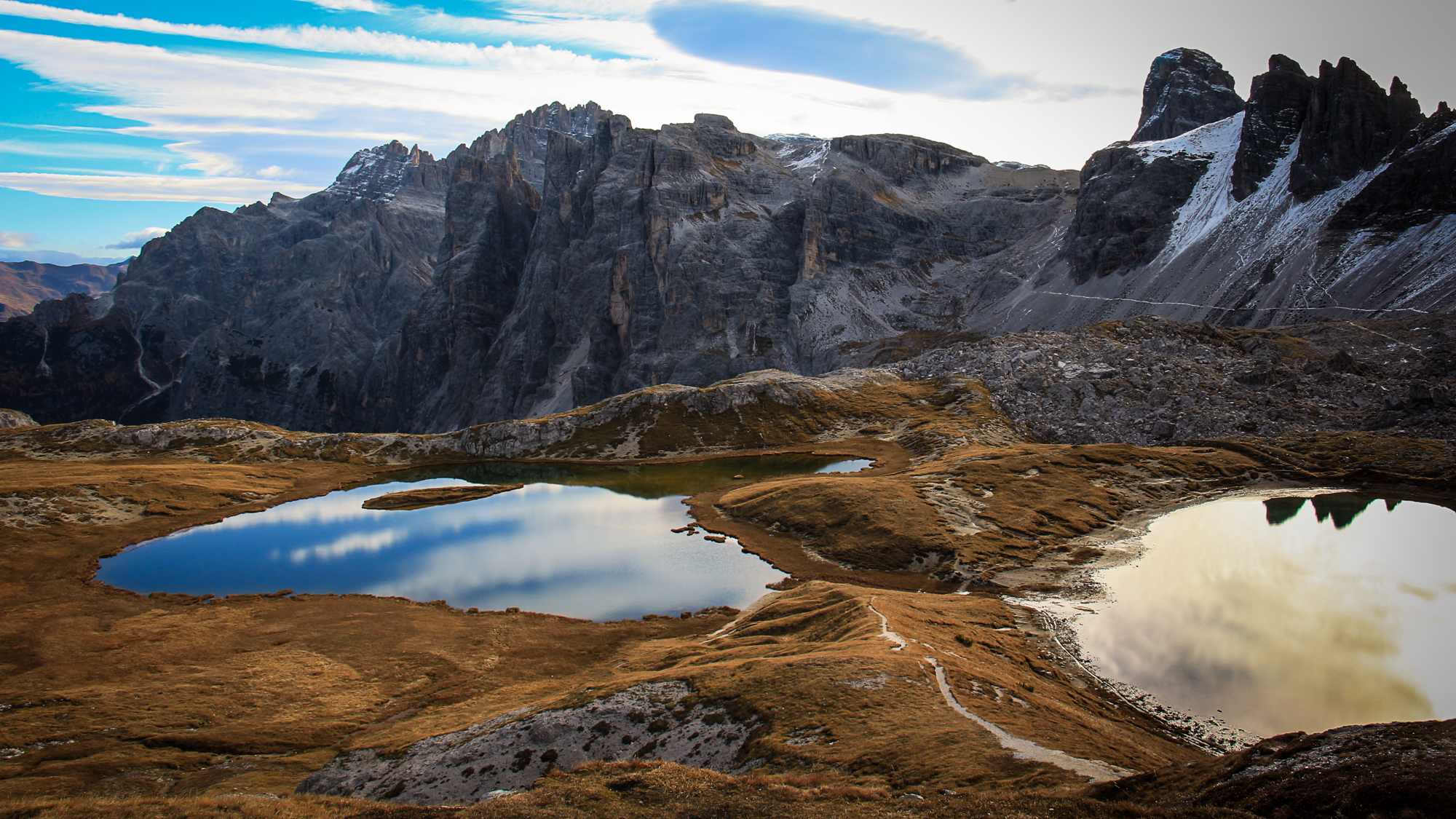
The two Piani lakes.

The new shelter was not renovated but was built in a slightly different position. A simple monument built on an edge of the former visible location recalls the previous structure. It also receives the complementary name of Sepp Innerkofler, a mountain guide in the Dolomites.

At the refuge is a small chapel and two small lakes: the Piani lakes.

== Access ==
The Locatelli refuge can be reached from the Auronzo refuge, connected to Misurina (a hamlet of Auronzo) by a toll road. The minimum walking time required to reach the Locatelli refuge from the Auronzo refuge (car park) is approximately 1h 20 '. The connection with Sexten via the Fischlein Valley is more demanding. It can also be reached from Lake Landro in three hours.

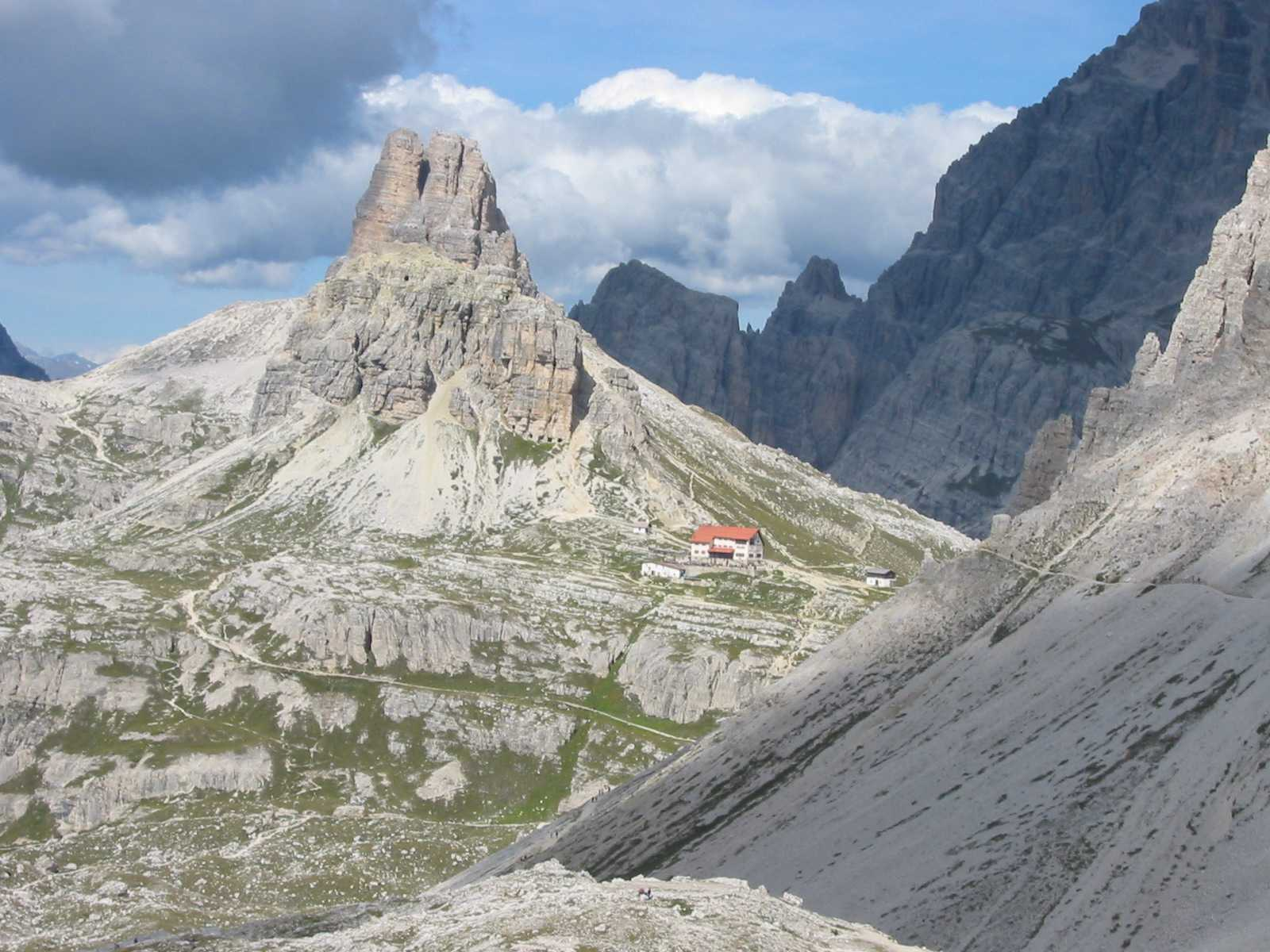
The Locatelli hut, and the Toblin Tower in the background.

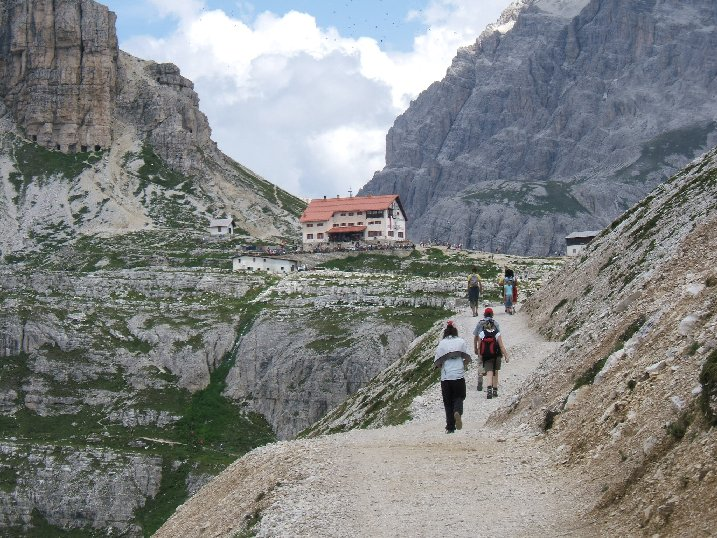
The Locatelli hut, and the Sasso di Sesto (on the left).

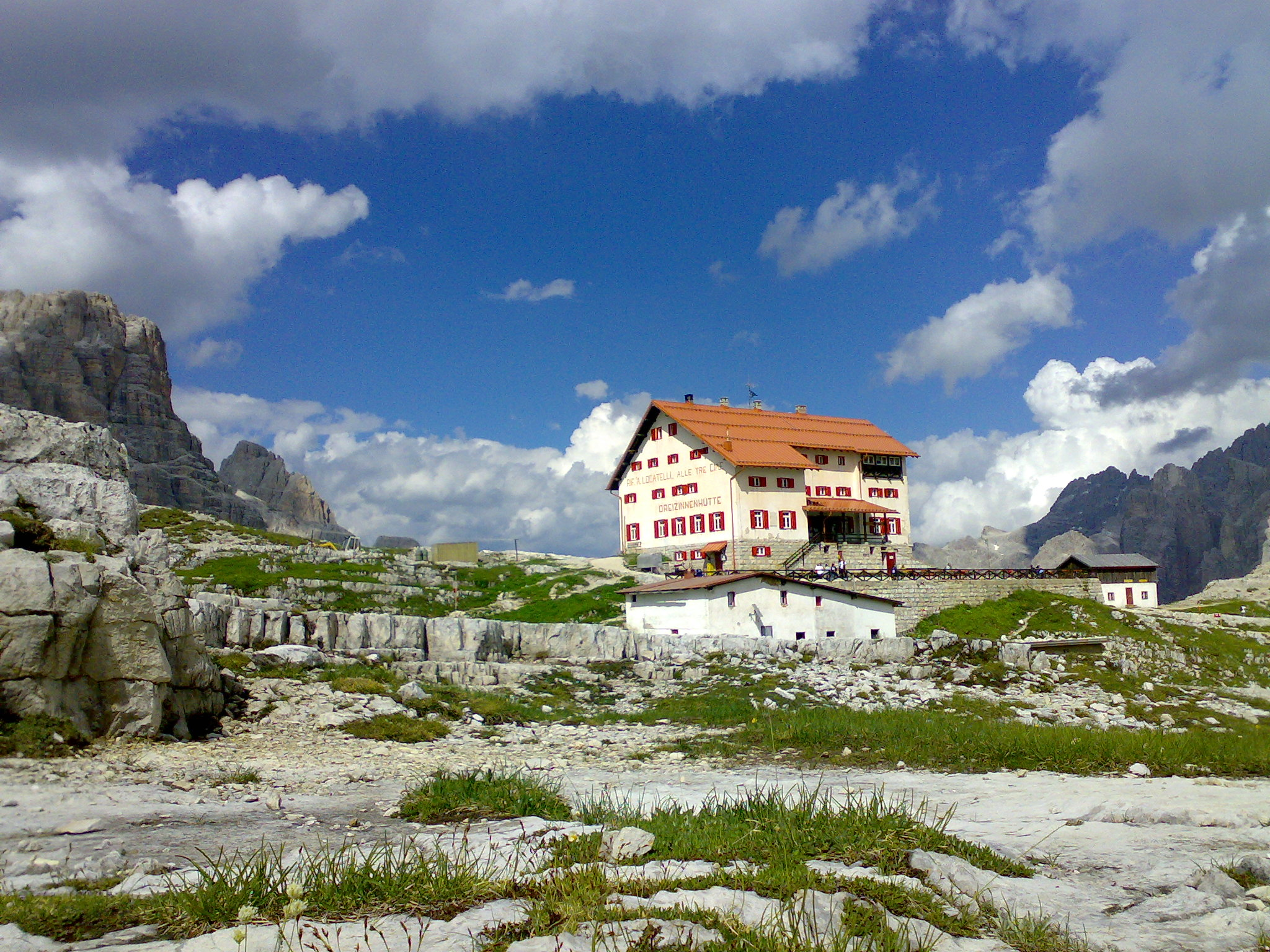
The Locatelli hut.

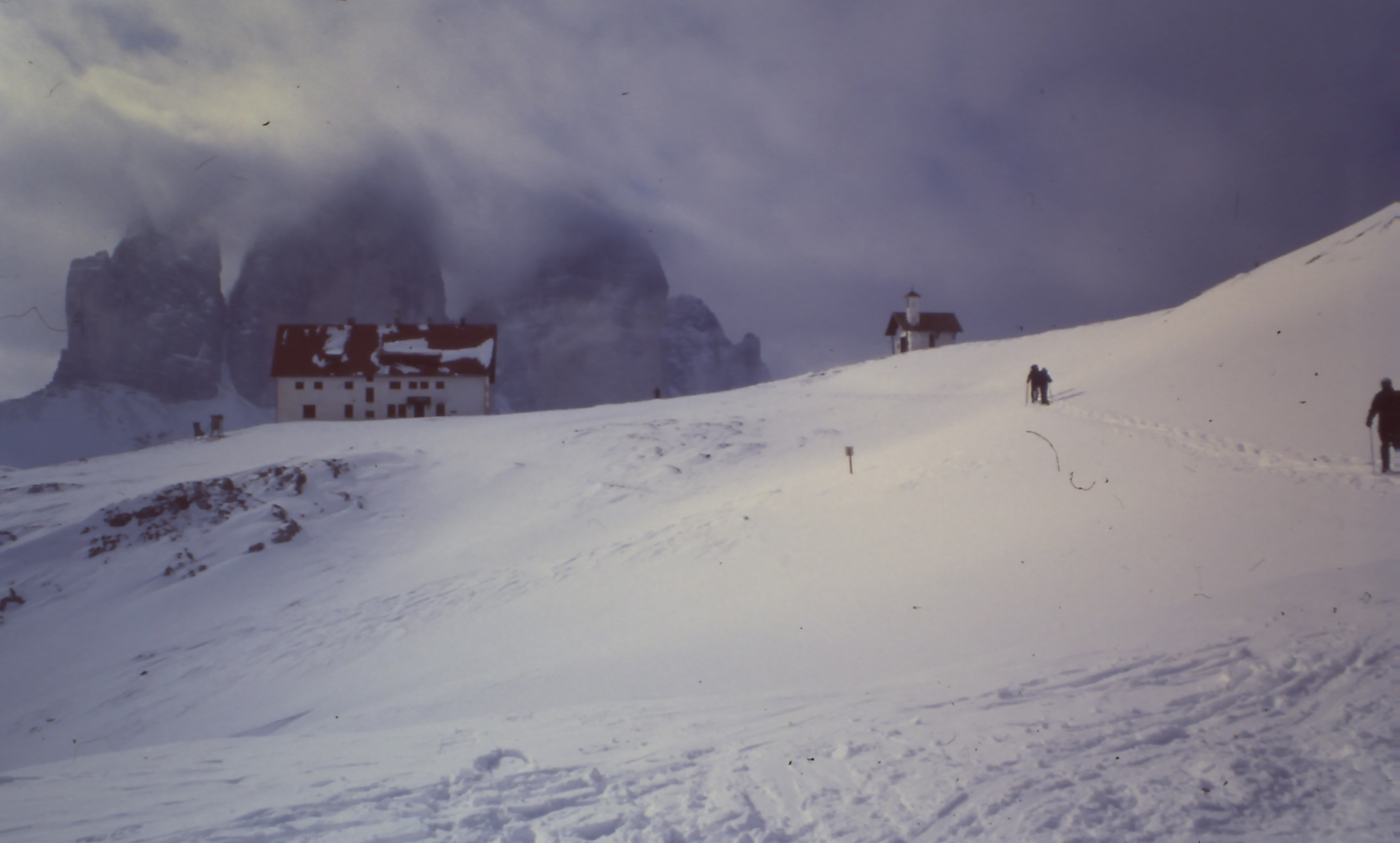
The Tre Cime during winter, with the Locatelli hut in the foreground.
