= Croda Passaporto =

Mountain in Italy

- German: Passportenkofel
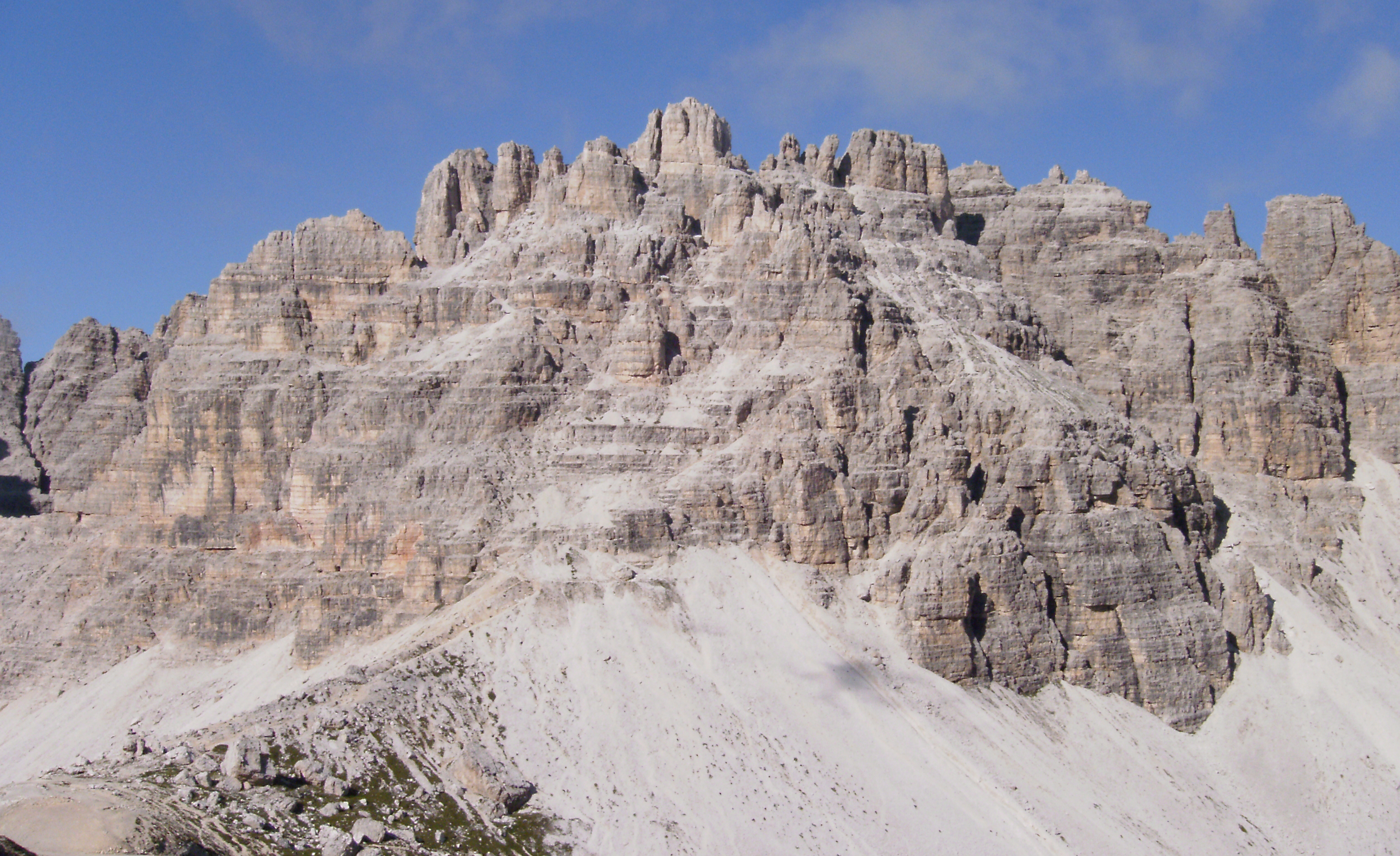
- South aspect

Highest point
- Elevation: 2,719 m (8,921 ft)
- Prominence: 194 m (636 ft)
- Parent peak: Monte Paterno
- Isolation: 0.75 km (0.47 mi)
- Coordinates: 46°37′26″N 12°19′07″E

Naming
- Etymology: Passport

Geography
- Location within Italy
- Interactive map of Croda Passaporto
- Country: Italy
- Province: South Tyrol / Belluno
- Protected area: Drei Zinnen / Tre Cime Nature Park
- Parent range: Dolomites; Sexten Dolomites
- Topo map: Tabacco 10 Sextener Dolomiten/Dolomiti di Sesto

Geology
- Rock age: Triassic
- Rock type: Dolomite

Climbing
- First ascent: August 1889

Croda Passaporto is a mountain on the shared boundary between the provinces of Belluno and South Tyrol in northern Italy.

== Description ==
Croda Passaporto, also known as Passportenkofel and Passportenkopf in German, is a 2,719-meter-elevation (8,921-foot) summit in the Sexten Dolomites subrange of the Dolomites, a UNESCO World Heritage Site. Set on the shared boundary between the Trentino-Alto Adige/Südtirol and Veneto regions, the peak is located 15 kilometers (9.3 miles) northeast of the town of Cortina d'Ampezzo, and the peak is situated on the boundary of Drei Zinnen / Tre Cime Nature Park. Precipitation runoff from the peak drains chiefly to the Ansiei River which is a tributary of the Piave, except the northwest slope drains into headwaters of the Rienz. Topographic relief is significant as the summit rises 1,120 meters (3,675 feet) above the Cengia Valley in two kilometers (1.24 miles). The nearest higher neighbor is Monte Paterno, 0.75 kilometer (0.47 mile) to the north-northwest. Also known as Cime Passaporto, the Italian toponyms translate as "Passport Crags" or "Passport Peaks" as named in association with Forcella Passaporto (Passport Pass) which is the low point of the saddle between this peak and Monte Paterno.

== History ==
The first ascent of the summit was made on August 19, 1889, by Hans Helversen and guide Sepp Innerkofler via the south flank.

Until the First World War, the present border between the provinces of South Tyrol and Belluno was the state border between Austria-Hungary and Italy. At the start of the White War of 1915–1918, the border was occupied by Italy. Fighting at Croda Passaporto took place on May 26, 1915, in the course of an Austrian offensive against Italian positions. The first climber of Croda Passaporto, Sepp Innerkofler, was involved in this operation and supervised it from Monte Paterno. On May 29, Croda Passaporto, like Monte Paterno, was held by Italy until the withdrawal of Italian Alpini from the area in November 1917. Relics of the war such as trenches, tunnels, and via ferratas can still be seen in the area.

== Climate ==
Based on the Köppen climate classification, Croda Passaporto is located in an alpine climate zone with long, cold winters, and short, mild summers. Weather systems are forced upwards by the mountains (orographic lift), causing moisture to drop in the form of rain and snow. The months of June through September offer the most favorable weather for visiting this area.

== Gallery ==
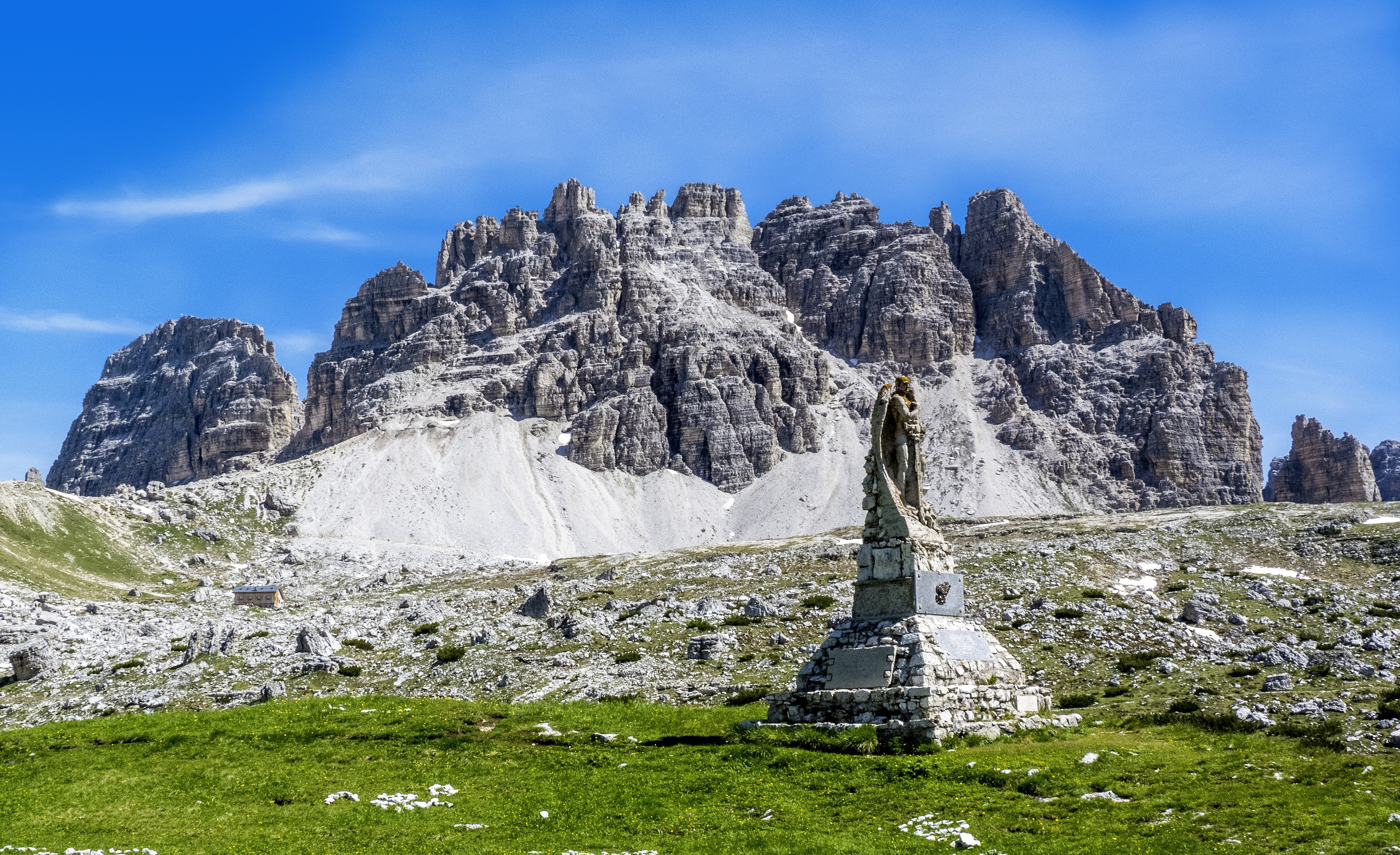
South aspect of Croda Passaporto. Monte Paterno behind to left.
Foreground is Monument to Bersaglieri, The Angel of the Fallen

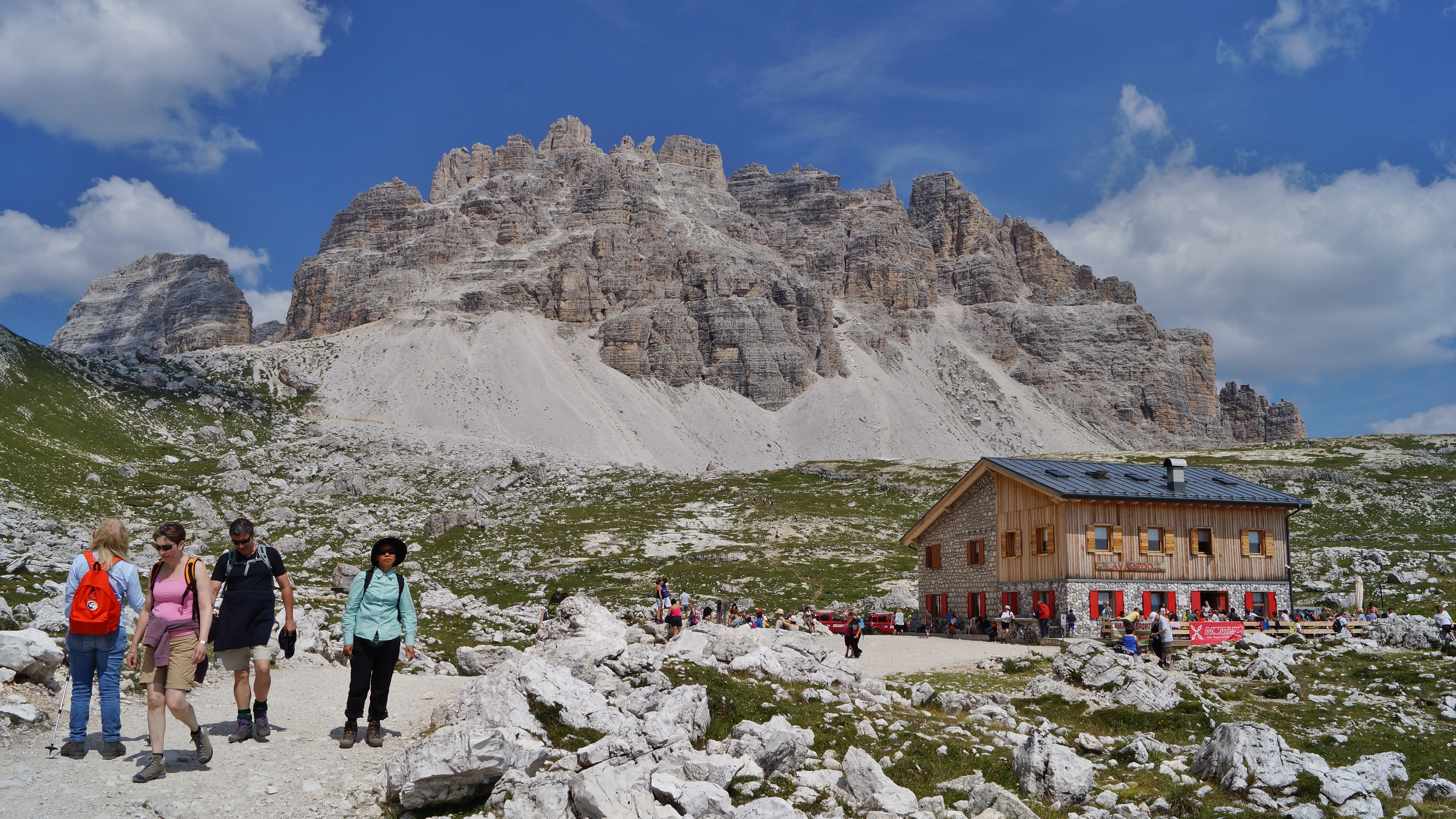
Croda Passaporto and Rifugio Lavaredo

== See also ==
- Southern Limestone Alps
