= List of Croatian inventors =

This is a list of Croatian inventors.

== B ==
- Zlata Bartl
- Josip Belušić
- Ruđer Bošković

== D ==
- Ivan Đikić
- Igor Dvornik

== F ==
- Vilim Srećko Feller

== G ==
- Marin Getaldić

== H ==
- Franjo Hanaman

== J ==
- Aleksandar Just

== K ==
- Franjo Kajfež
- Marcel pl. Kiepach
- Ivo Kolin
- Benedikt Kotruljević
- Ferdinand Kovačević

== L ==
- Antun Lučić
- Ivan Lupis-Vukić

== M ==
- Ante Maglica
- Peter Miscovich
- Andrija Mohorovičić

== P ==
- Slavoljub Penkala
- Herman Potočnik
- Vladimir Prelog
- Mario Puratić

== R ==
- Mate Rimac
- Lavoslav Ružička

== S ==
- David Schwarz
- Pavao Skalić
- Marin Soljačić

== U ==
- Tomislav Uzelac

== V ==
- Faust Vrančić
- Ivan Vučetić
