= Paternkofel =

Mountain in Italy

Paterno
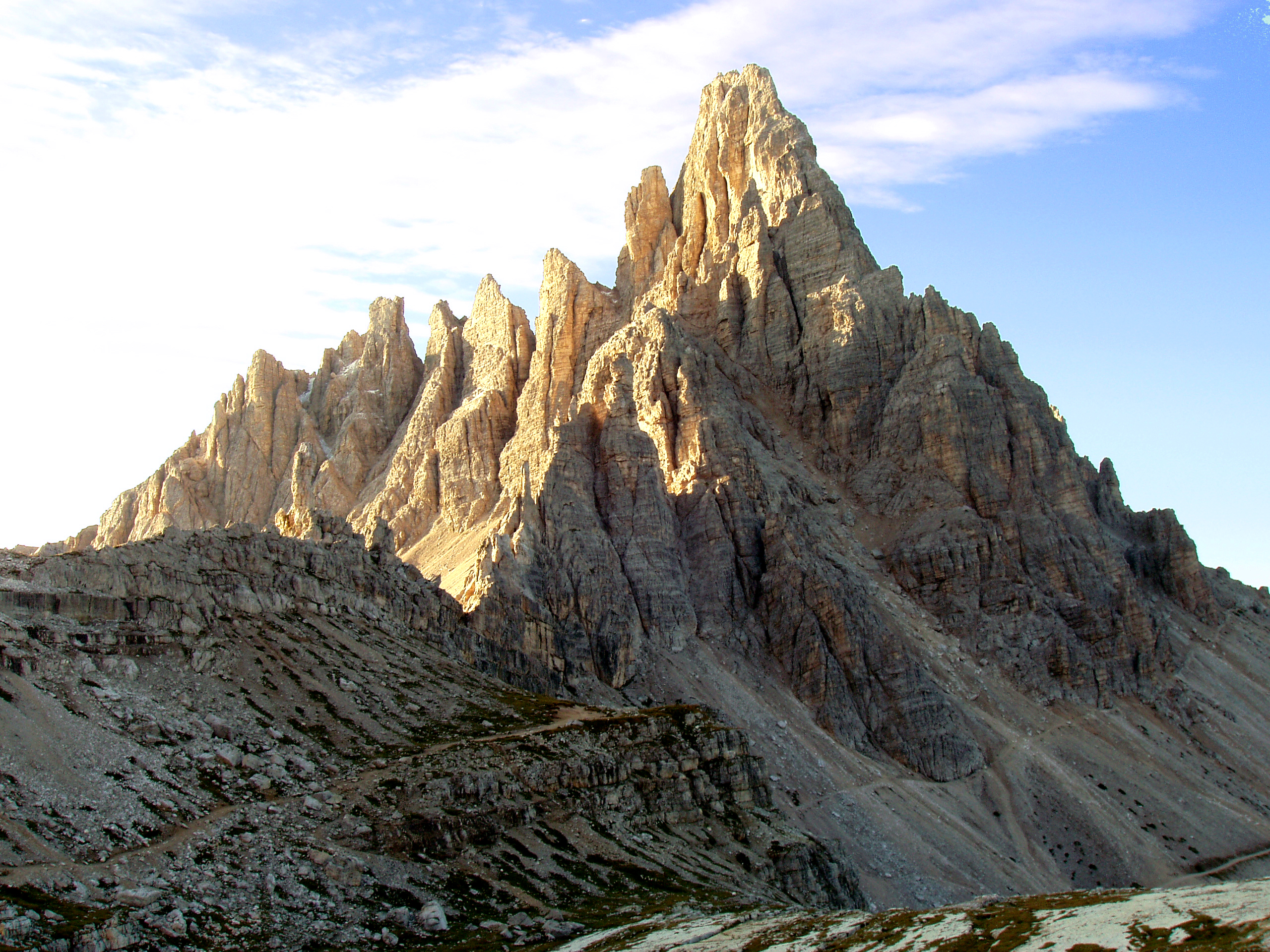

Highest point
- Elevation: 2,744 m (9,003 ft)
- Coordinates: 46°37′31″N 12°18′55″E

Geography
- Location: South Tyrol / Province of Belluno (Italy)
- Parent range: Dolomites

Climbing
- First ascent: 11 September 1882 by Franz Innerkofler

The Paterno (German: Paternkofel) is a mountain in the Dolomites on the border between South Tyrol and the Province of Belluno, Italy.

== Gallery ==
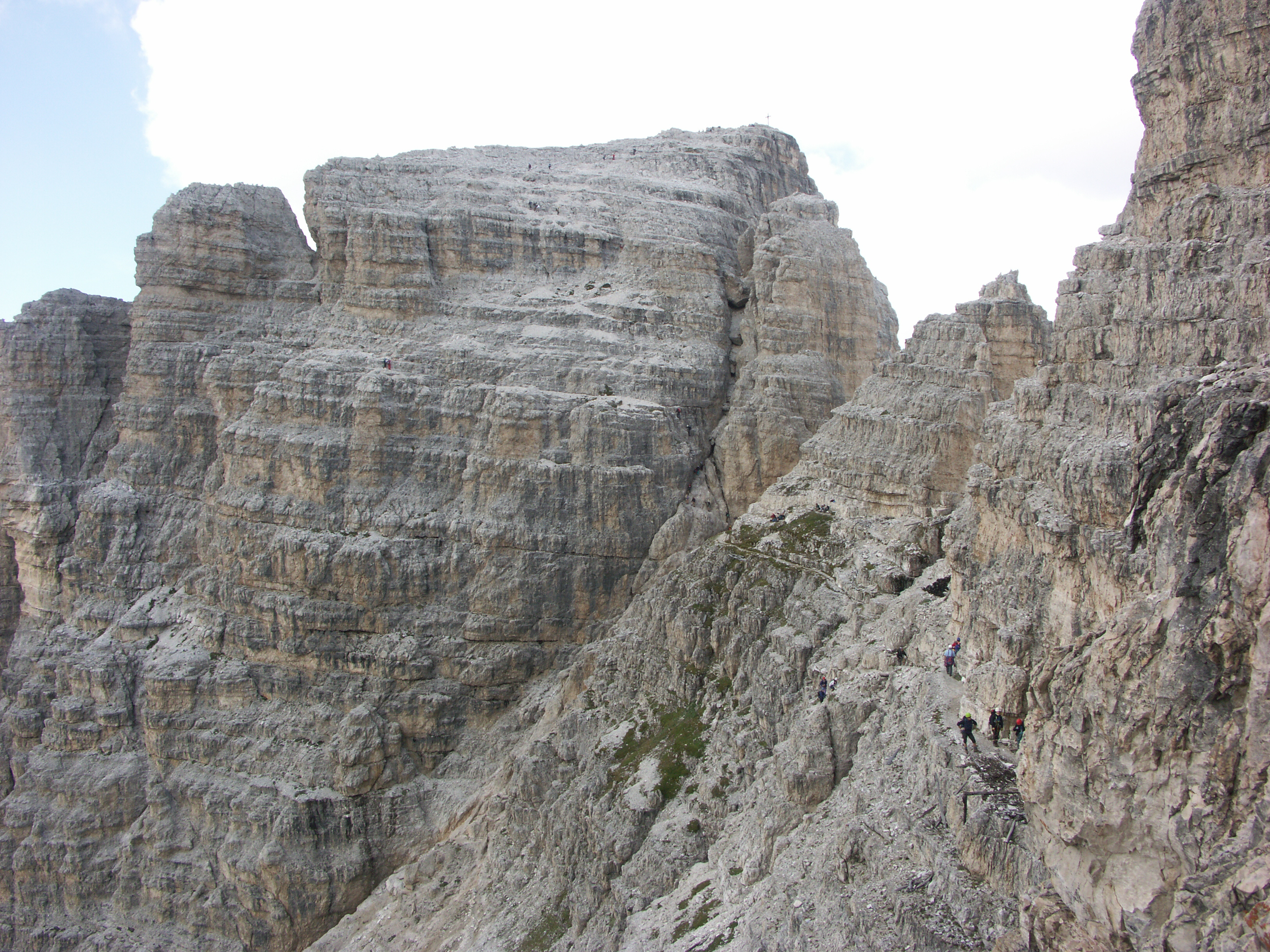

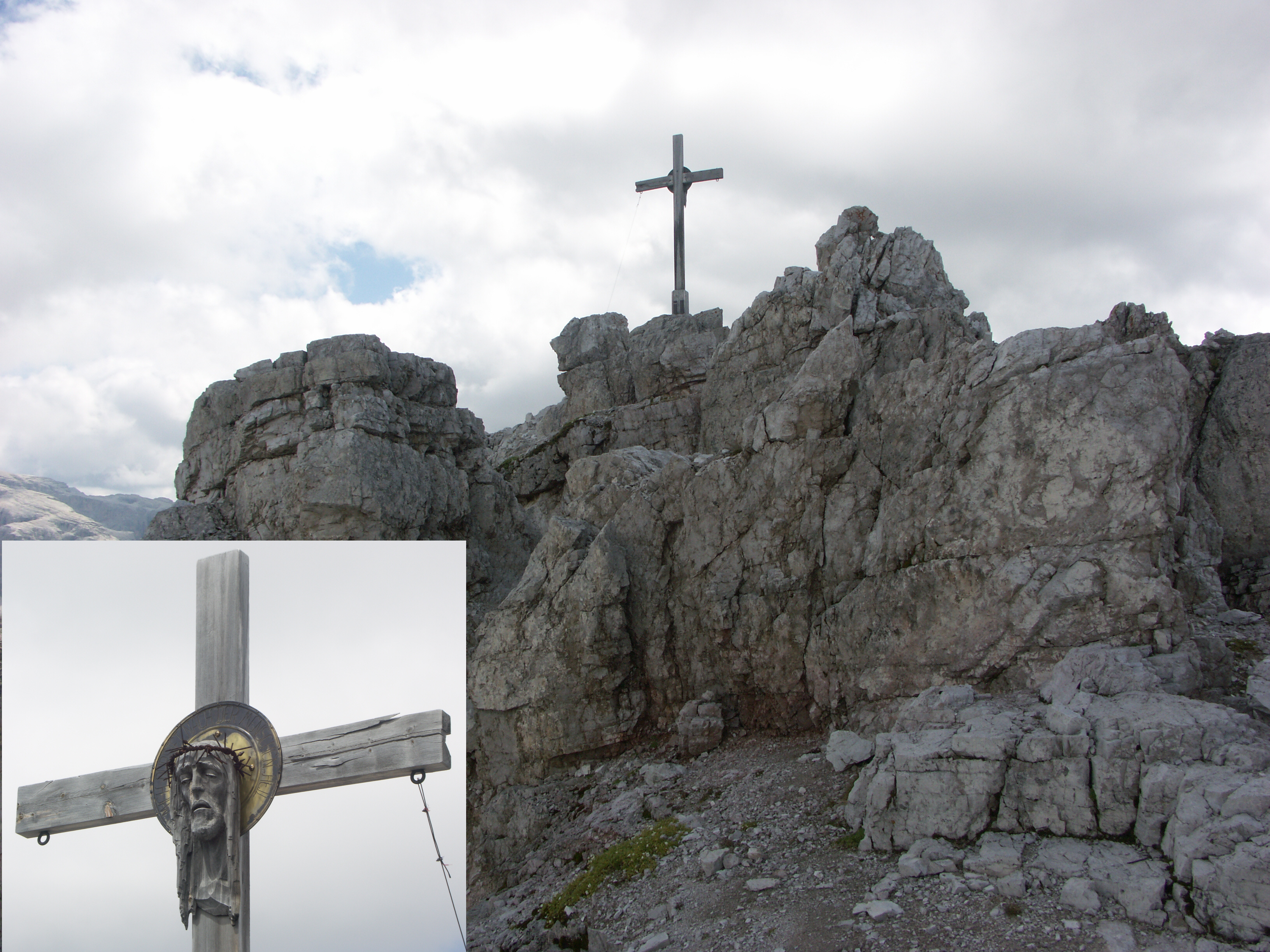

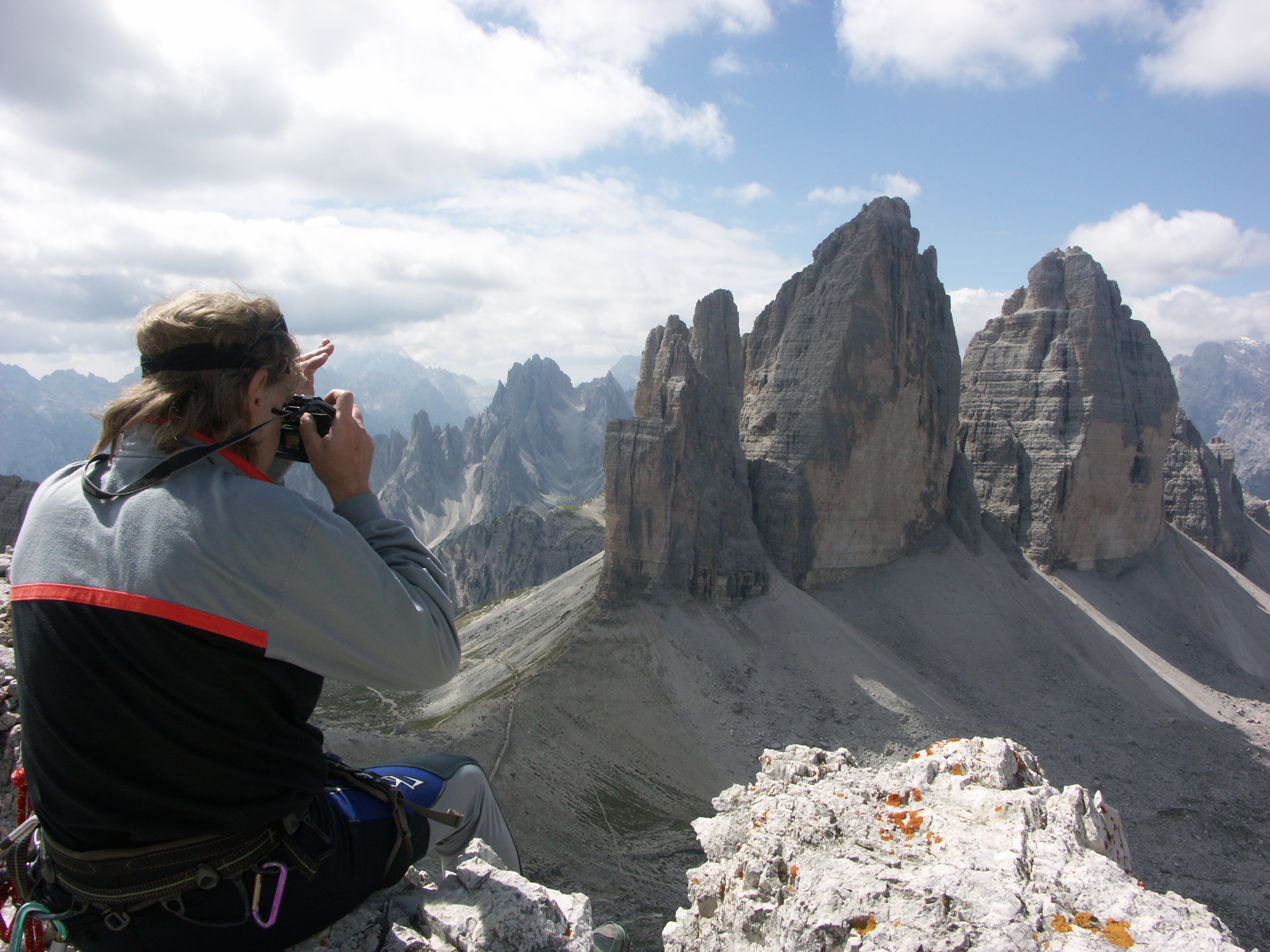

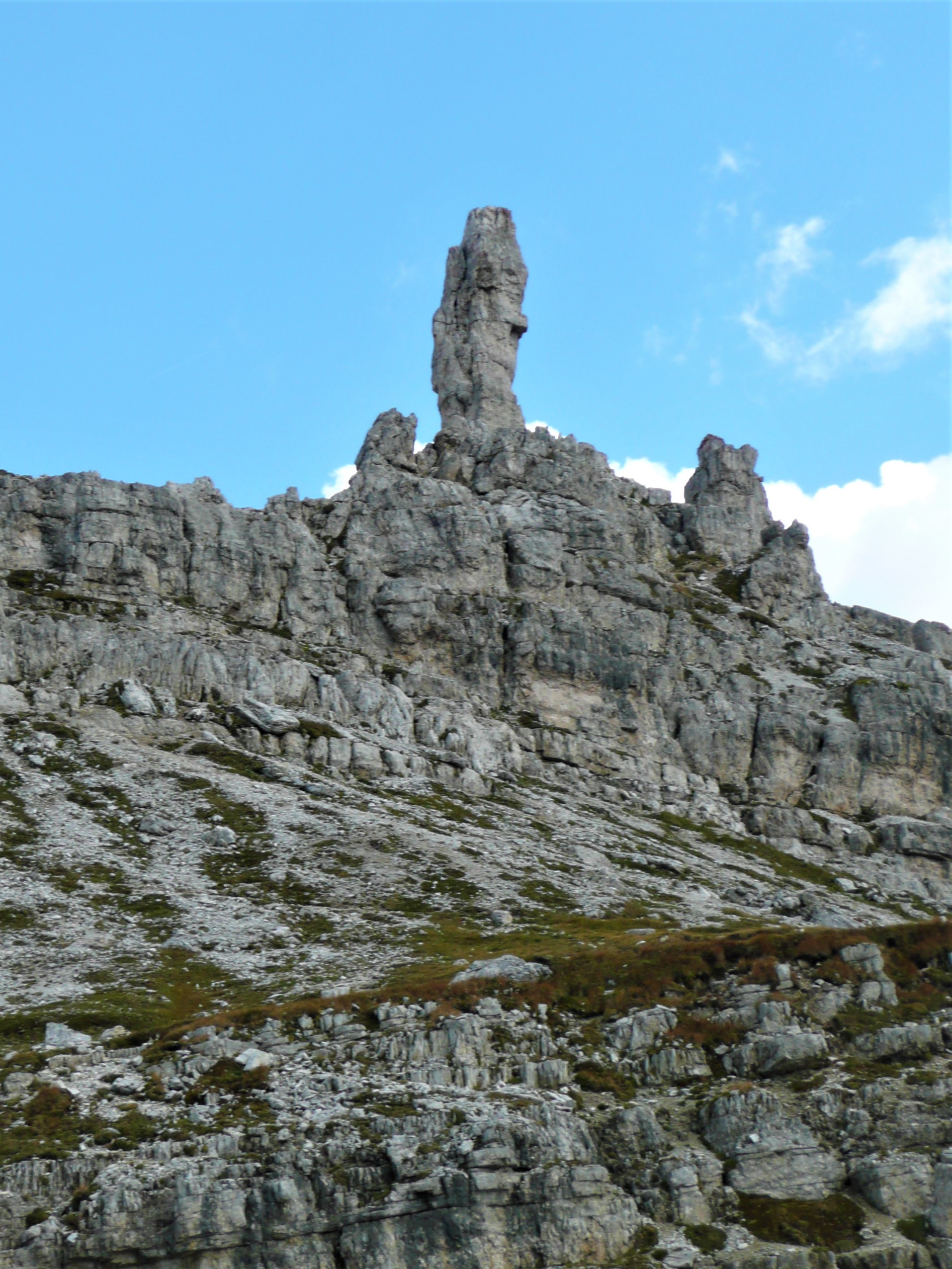
