= Igor Dvornik =

Igor Dvornik (9 May 1923, Split – 21 August 2010, Zagreb) was a Croatian radiation chemist.

Dvornik proposed and developed two original chemical dosimetry systems based on ethanol-chlorobenzene solutions of which the one designed for high-doses is accepted as an ISO standard and is one of the most widely used dosimetry systems. His work in understanding high hydrochloric acid yield of the ethanol-chlorobenzene dosimeter led to him being among the first to propose the existence of presolvated 'dry' electron reactions.
