= Italian fortifications on the Austro-Hungarian border =

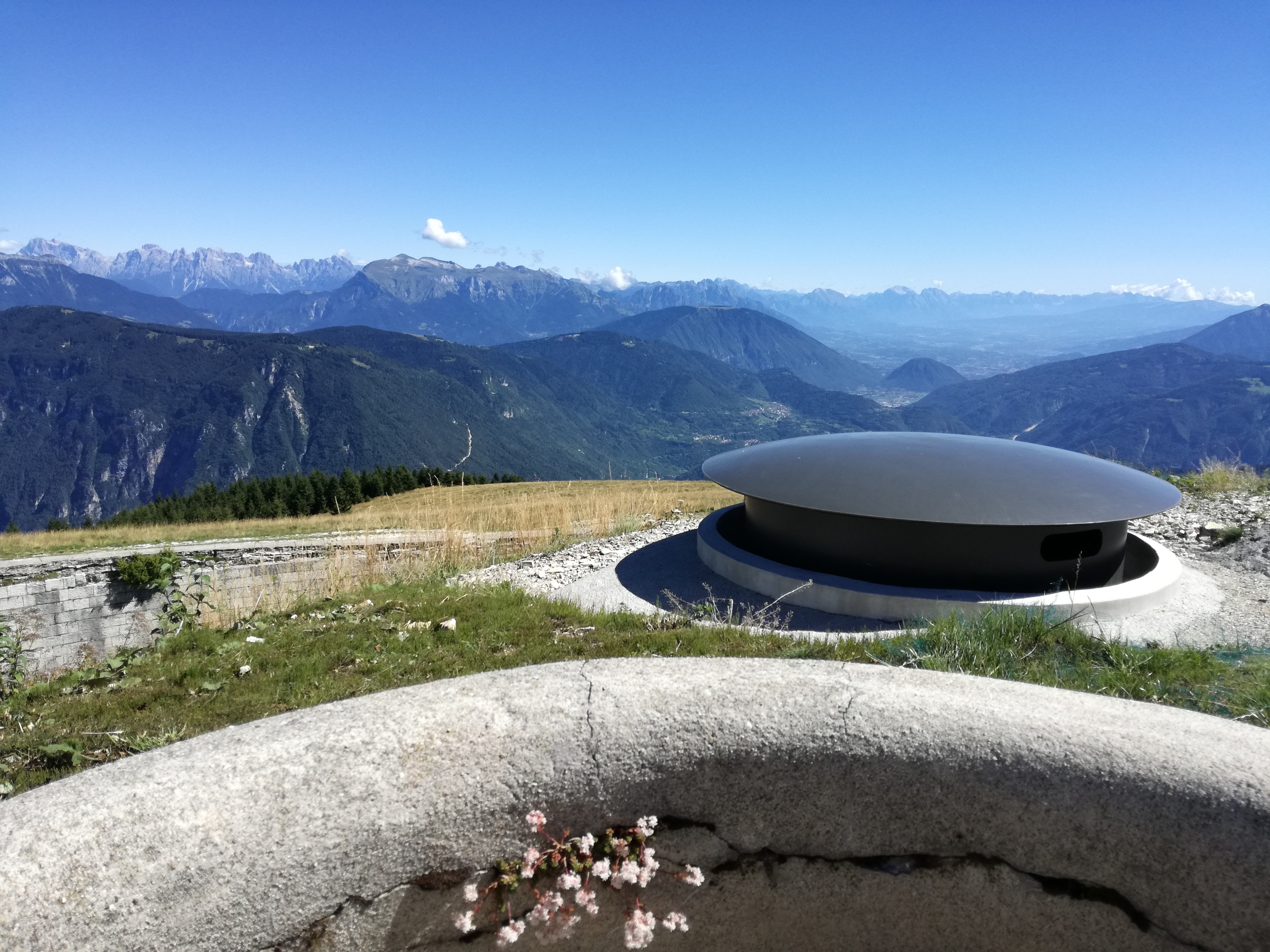
Forte Lisser - vanishing turret

Between the 1860s and the First World War the Kingdom of Italy built a number of fortifications along its border with Austria-Hungary. From 1859 the fortified border ran south from Switzerland to Lake Garda, between Italian Lombardy and Austrian South Tyrol. After 1866 it extended to include the border between South Tyrol and Veneto, from Lake Garda to the Carnic Alps. This frontier was difficult to defend, since Austria-Hungary held the higher ground, and an invasion would immediately threaten the industrial and agricultural heartlands of the Po valley. Between 1900 and 1910, Italy also built a series of fortifications along the defensive line of the Tagliamento to protect against an invasion from the northeast. The border with Switzerland was also fortified in what is known as the Cadorna Line.

== Construction ==
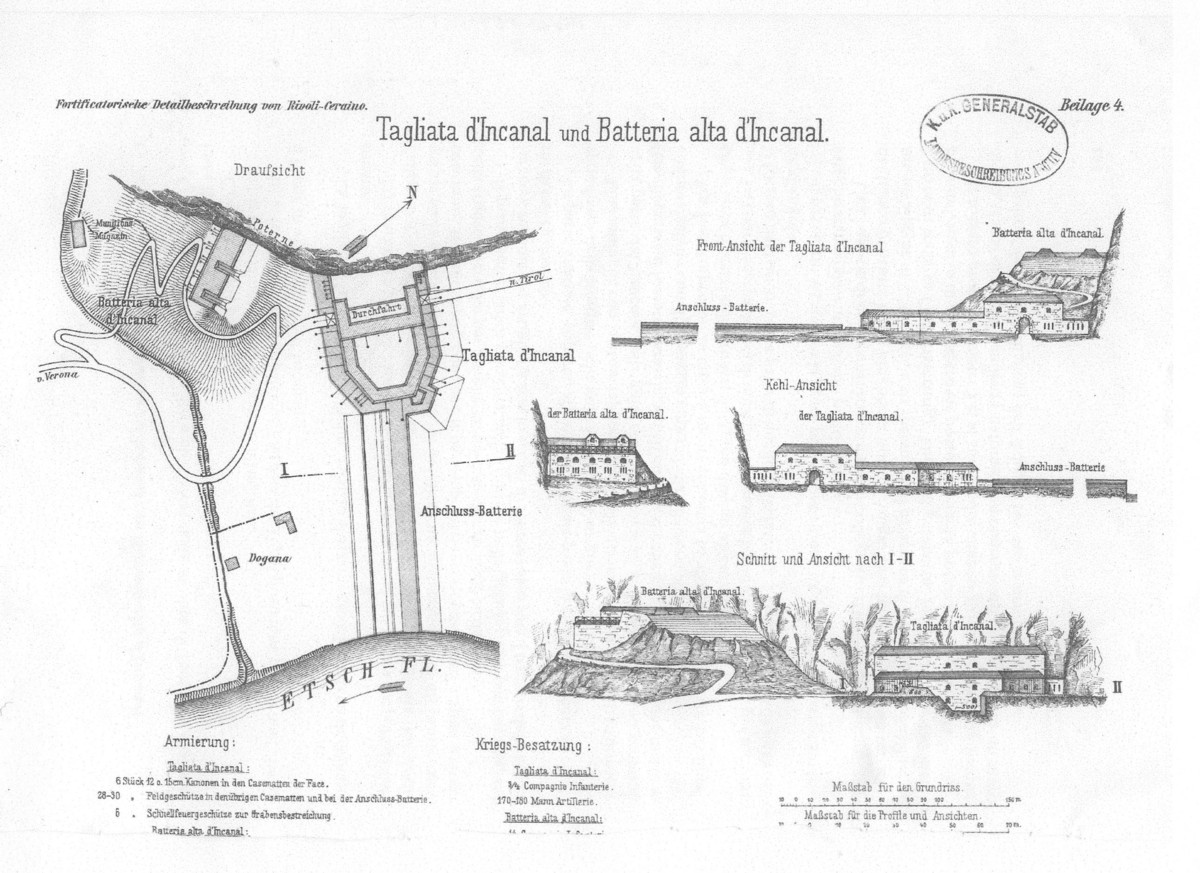
Ground plan of the Tagliata d' Incanal, part of the Rivoli group

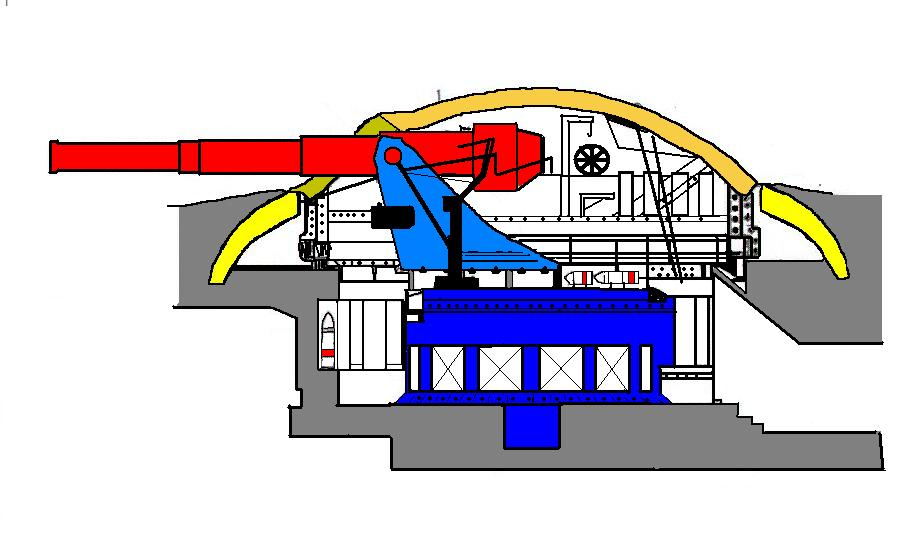
Schneider type rotating armoured turret with 149/35 S. cannon

The first wave of fortification building aimed to block the advance of Austrian armies of a traditional nature. From 1870 a second wave of building took place, in which fortifications were built with much thicker walls and lower profiles, responding to advances in artillery technology. From around 1900 new buildings were made from reinforced concrete, with cannons and howitzers firing from inside armoured domes. As much of the structure as possible was underground.

In some cases fortifications were not newly built, but developments of earlier structures from the Republic of Venice. Others were originally constructed by Austria-Hungary before being lost to Italy in 1866. Among these were the forts of the Rivoli and Pastrengo groups, built to defend Verona.

Because Italy was in a hurry to complete its key fortifications before war started, the newest forts - Forte Campolongo and Verena in particular - had not been well built. Instead of reinforcing their concrete with steel, they used stones, wood and waste material instead.

== Organisation ==
At the start of the First World War, Italian fortifications were organised into defensive groups called ‘sbarramenti’ (“barriers”).

Under the First Army, 3rd Army Corps, 5th Division:

- Bormio barrier: upper Adda including Forte Dossaccio (also called Fort Venini or Fort Oga)(note: there is also an Austrian fortress called Dossacio which is in a different place)
- Poschiavino barrier: blocking the Val Poschiavo
- Tonale-Mortirolo barrier: defending the upper Oglio, Camonica and Valtellina including Forte Corno D'Aola

Under the First Army, 3rd Army Corps, 6th Division:

- Giudicarie Barrier: Val Chiese and Val Mela including Forte di Cima Ora and Forte di Valledrane
- Agno-Assa:
  - Schio sector - (V Army Corps) (Agno-Posina barrier)
  - Arsiero sector (9th Division) Including Forte Casa Ratti, Forte Corbin, Forte Campolongo, Forte Campomolon,
  - Asiago sector (34th Division) including Forte Interrotto

Under the First Army, 5th Army Corps, 15th Division:

- Brenta-Cismon barrier including Forte Cima Lan, Forte Coldarco, Forte Tagliata delle Fontanelle, Forte Leone, Forte Lisser, Forte Tagliata della Scala, Forte Tombion

== 1915-1916 on the Asiago plateau ==
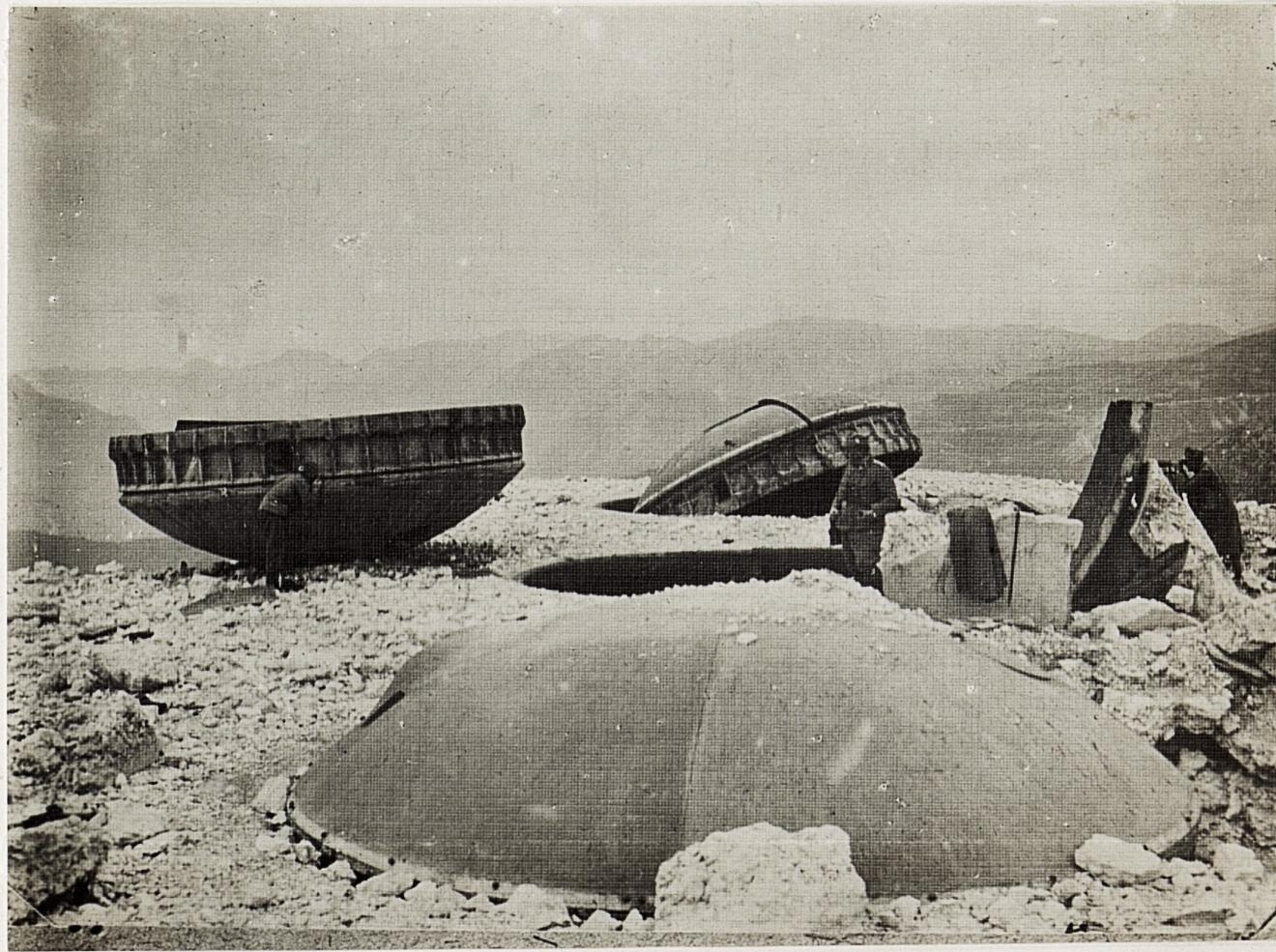
Damage to Fort Campolongo

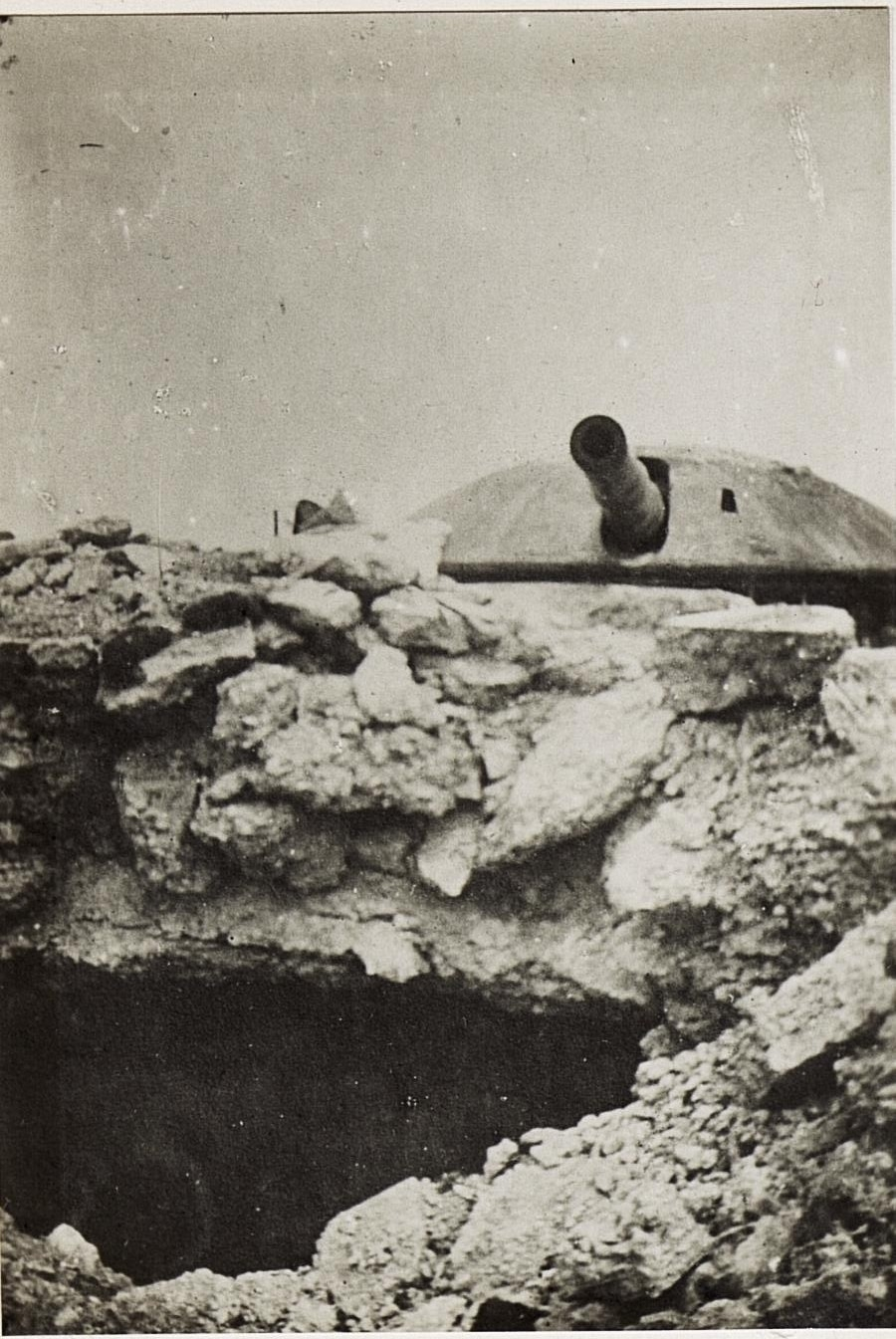
Damage to Fort Verena

The first shot fired after Italy's declaration of war was from Forte Verena, which opened fire on Fort Lusern with its four 149mm cannon. However, at nearly the maximum range of Verena's guns, the shells did negligible damage The bombardment lasted from 24 May to 12 June, when the Austrians surrendered, but nearby Austrian forts rallied to its defence and pushed the Italians back.

Forte Campolongo was built to counter the Austrian strongpoint Fort Verle. It too had four 149mm cannon. Bringing up additional artillery, the Italians were able to virtually destroy Fort Verle, but were still unable to take it with their infantry because of the maze of trenches and barbed wire that surrounded it.

On 12 June 1915 an Austrian barrage struck Forte Verena, causing the deaths of 44 soldiers. Given the damage and weakness of the structure, the Italian High Command decided to abandon it. On May 22, 1916, during the Battle of Asiago, it was occupied by the Austrians.

In July 1915 Fort Campolongo was also severely damaged by an 305mm Austro-Hungarian Škoda mortar and it was almost completely destroyed on May 15, 1916, by the shells of a 380mm howitzer (called "Barbara") positioned near Fort Lusern at the start of the Asiago offensive. On May 22, 1916, it was occupied by the Austrians who then held it until the end of the war.

== 1917 on the Tagliamento ==
After the defeat at Caporetto the fortifications along the Tagliamento did not prevent an Austrian advance. Because the forts were far from the relatively static front lines in 1915, the High Command disarmed them and left them unmanned. There was not enough time in October 1917 to prepare them for their intended strategic role, so their usefulness was very limited. The Coidriopo and Latisana Artillery Batteries were able to shell the Austrian bridgeheads and inflicted moderate casualties, as well as stopping their forces for a day or two. Fort Ragogna was also able to hold the Austrians back, just long enough to allow most of the Italians to cross the Tagliamento safely on their retreat, but forces under General Alfred Krauss and Karl Scotti managed to cross the river at upstream points near Pinzano al Tagliamento and Cornino. With the Tagliamento line no longer secure, General Cadorna ordered his men to fall back behind the Piave.

== 1917-18 on Monte Grappa ==
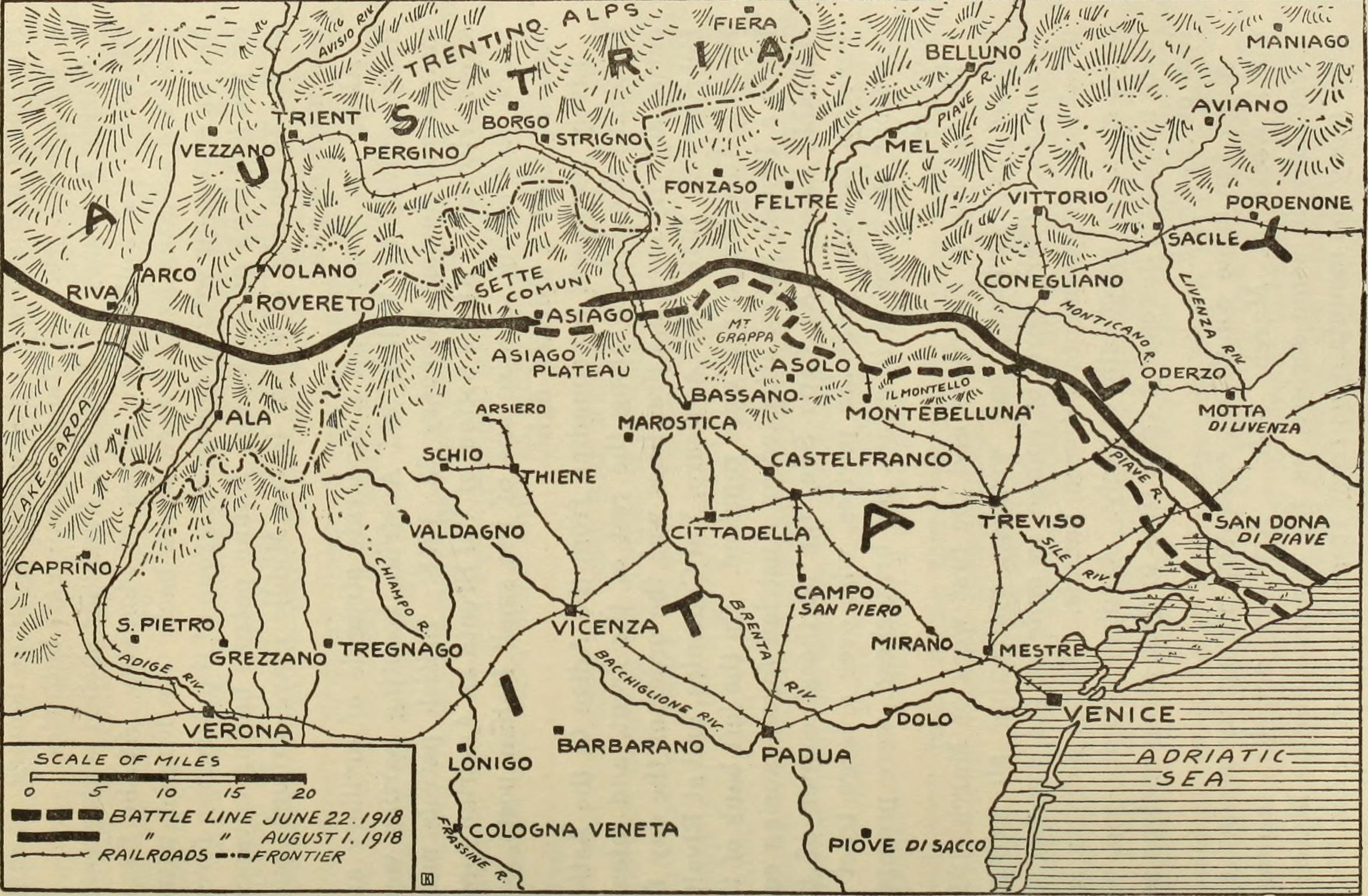
The front line on Monte Grappa, 1918

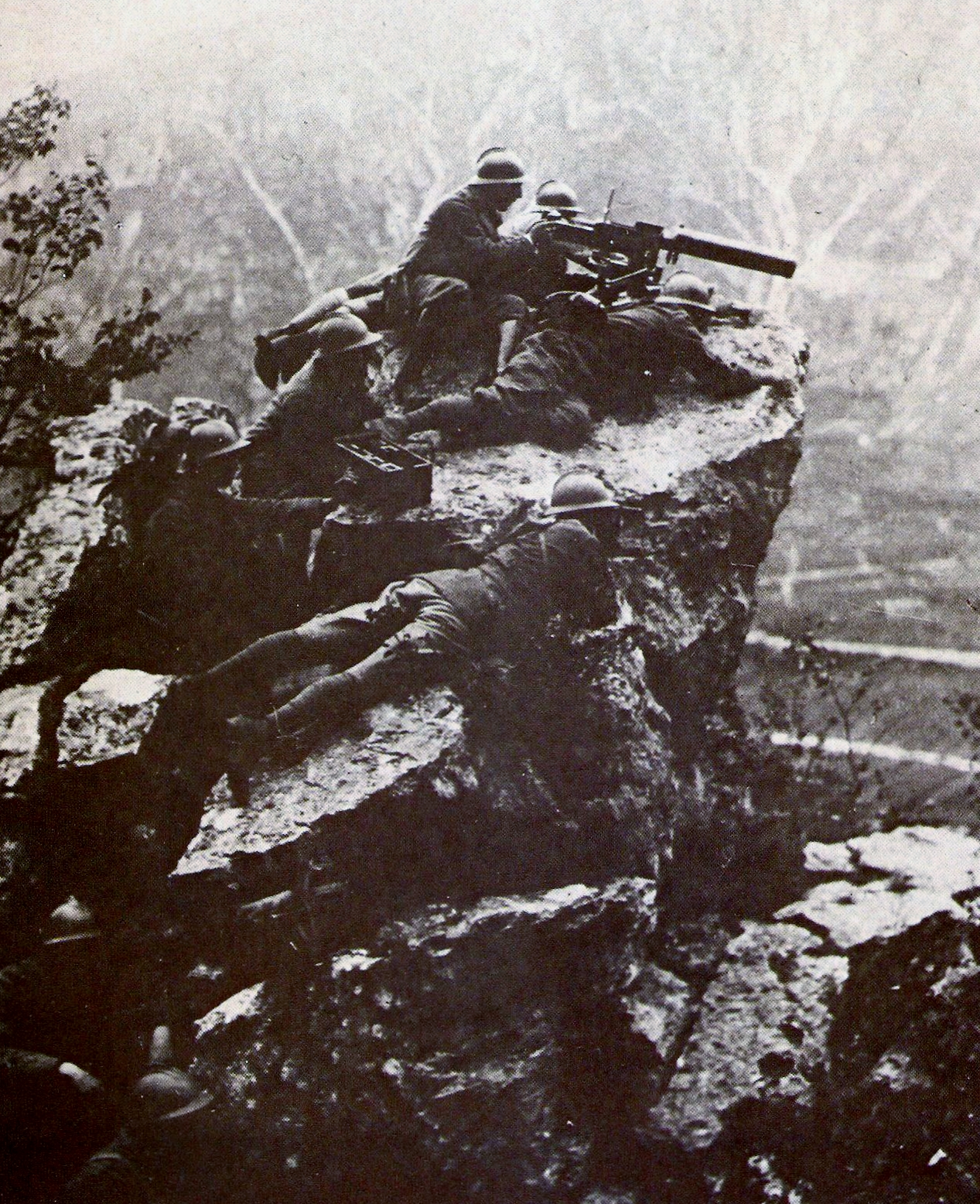
Italian machine-gunners on Monte Grappa

In early November 1917 Austrian and German forces reached the Piave and were confronted by the Monte Grappa massif that extends from the river to the Brenta-Cismon barrier in the west. Other Austrian armies also descended towards Monte Grappa from the north as Italian forces withdrew south from the Dolomites. Taking the mountain would allow the Austrians to strike towards Venice, Padua and Vicenza, so holding it became a strategic imperative for the Italians.

At the start of the war in 1915 Monte Grappa was unfortified, but General Cadorna anticipated its future importance and in the autumn of 1916 ordered the construction of extensive fortifications to turn it into a stronghold. This was to include a major defensive structure tunnelled into the summit as well as batteries and smaller outworks to provide crossfire against an enemy advancing from any direction on the slopes. This huge undertaking required the building of a new road, known as the Strada Cadorna, to bring building materials up the mountain from Bassano del Grappa. Colonel Antonio Dal Fabbro, a military engineer, was placed in charge of the project. On 7 October 1917 Cadorna inspected progress in building the fortifications, which were mainly facing towards the west, and ordered that the north and east he fortified too, in case there was a need to fall back from the Isonzo. After Caporetto, work proceeded at great speed on these sides of the mountain.

Work started on the tunnelling under the summit in November 1917. The creation of the “Galleria Vittorio Emanuele III” took ten months. Five kilometres of tunnel were dug, 3m high and between 1.8-2.5m wide. The main artery was 1.km long, and from this various side tunnels, observatories and artillery positions extended. The plan was for up to 15,000 men to live and fight in this underground complex for many months, surviving for two weeks if they were cut off from outside supplies. The complex eventually comprised 23 batteries with a total of 92 cannon and seventy machine guns. It also had generators for lighting, a ventilation system and defences against gas attack.

Between 19 November and 15 December 1917 the Austrians launched their first attack on the unfinished fortifications. The Italian High Command had 50 battalions on Monte Grappa – around 50,000 men, supported by a French contingent from December, and fought them off. During the so-called Battle of the Solstice from 15 June-6 July 1918, the Austrians mounted a second unsuccessful attack, during which 30,000 shells were fired from the fortifications onto Austrian positions, with a decisive impact on the battle.

== See also ==
- Austro-Hungarian fortifications on the Italian border
- Cadorna Line
- Mines on the Italian front (World War I)
- Military cableways in the First World War
