= Forte Corbin =

Italian fortification in northern Italy

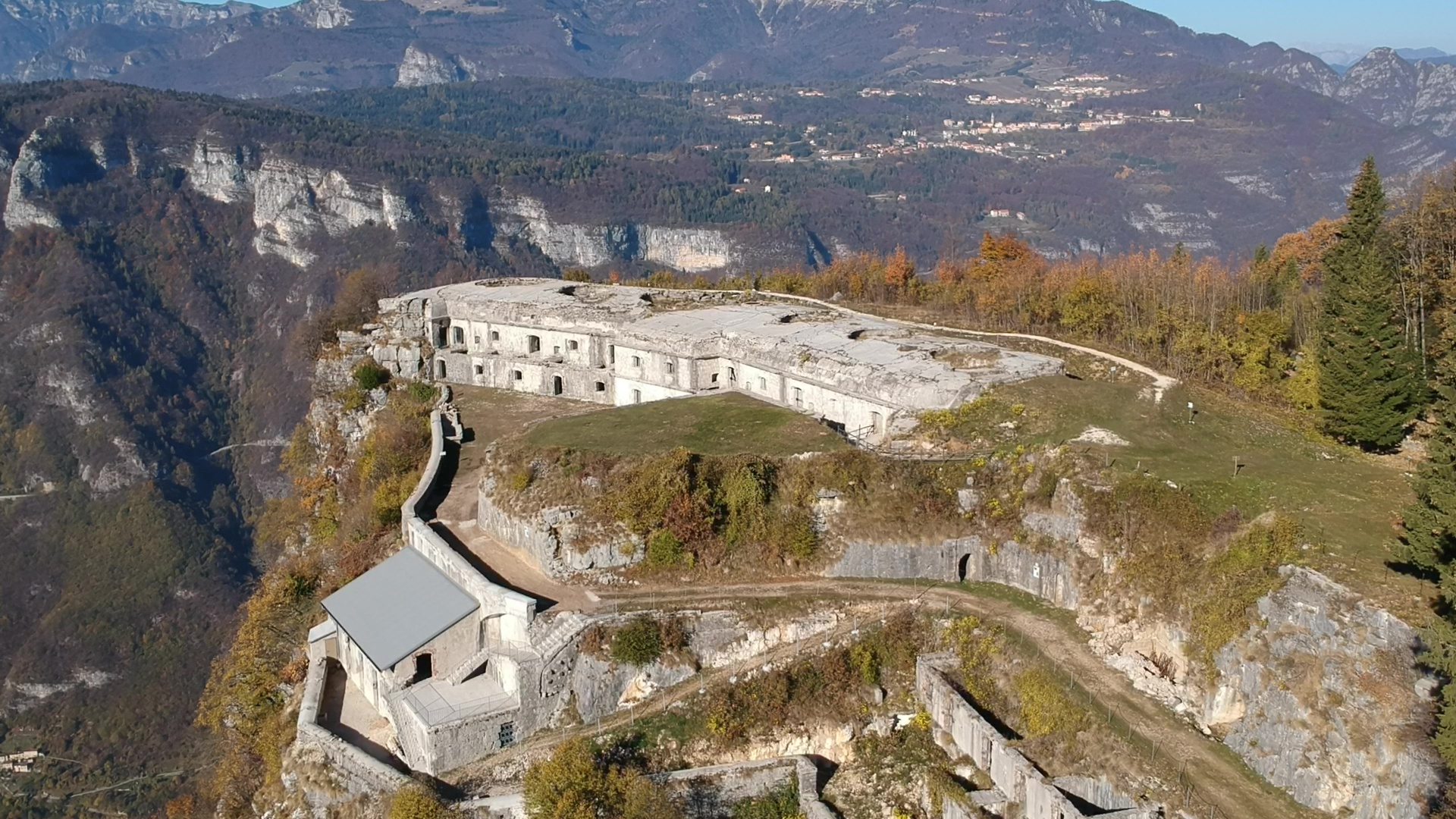
Fort Corbin and its impressive commanding view.

Fort Corbin is an Italian fortification that is part of the Agno-Assa Barrier. Construction started in 1906 and ended in 1911. Fort Corbin was crucially placed at the confluence of the Astico and Assa Rivers. Corbin is a “typical” Italian alpine fort, with an armament of 6 149mm howitzers in 18cm thick revolving steel cupolas, and 4 old bronze 87mm guns in casemates. Together with Forte Casa Ratti just below, they were meant to block the whole Astico Valley from invaders. Corbin’s roof was 25cm thick, and was able to resist all but the heaviest artillery possessed at the time.

== World War I ==
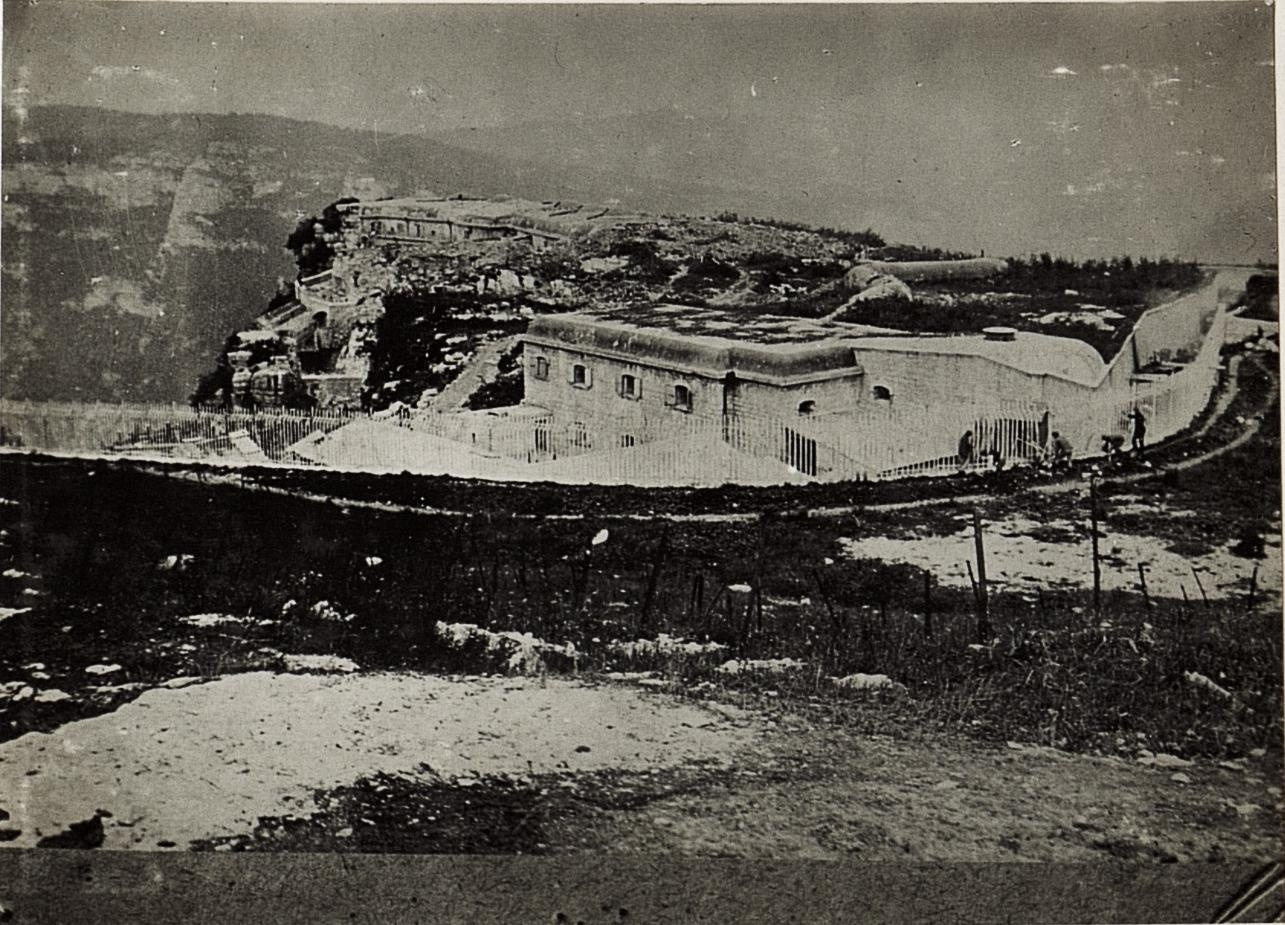
Fort Corbin is in the background, off to the center/left. On the closest building, we can faintly see a retractable observation dome.

Despite being one of the newest forts in its group, it was disarmed at the beginning of the war with Austria-Hungary in May 1915. To fool the Austro-Hungarians, tree trunks painted black were put in their place. On May 15, 1916, the Austrian 38cm howitzer "Barbara” fired 57 shells at Corbin from near Fort Lusern 13,250m (8.2mi) away. During the Battle of Asiago a few days later, Fort Corbin was captured by 24th Feldjäger Regiment with help from the 47th Feldjäger at the end of May. The next day Italian troops were ordered to recapture Corbin. At 6:30 that day, the 12th company of the 1st Sardinian Grenadier Regiment set out towards Corbin, and 30 minutes later the 10th company also set out. The combined attack by 5 companies began at 8:15. The attack quickly made headway, but the timely arrival of 12 soldiers repelled the assault. The Italians recaptured the fort on June 25, 1916, after the Austro-Hungarians abandoned it. Due to the precarious position of the fort in relation to the frontline, the restabilization efforts strictly took place inside.

== Post-War ==
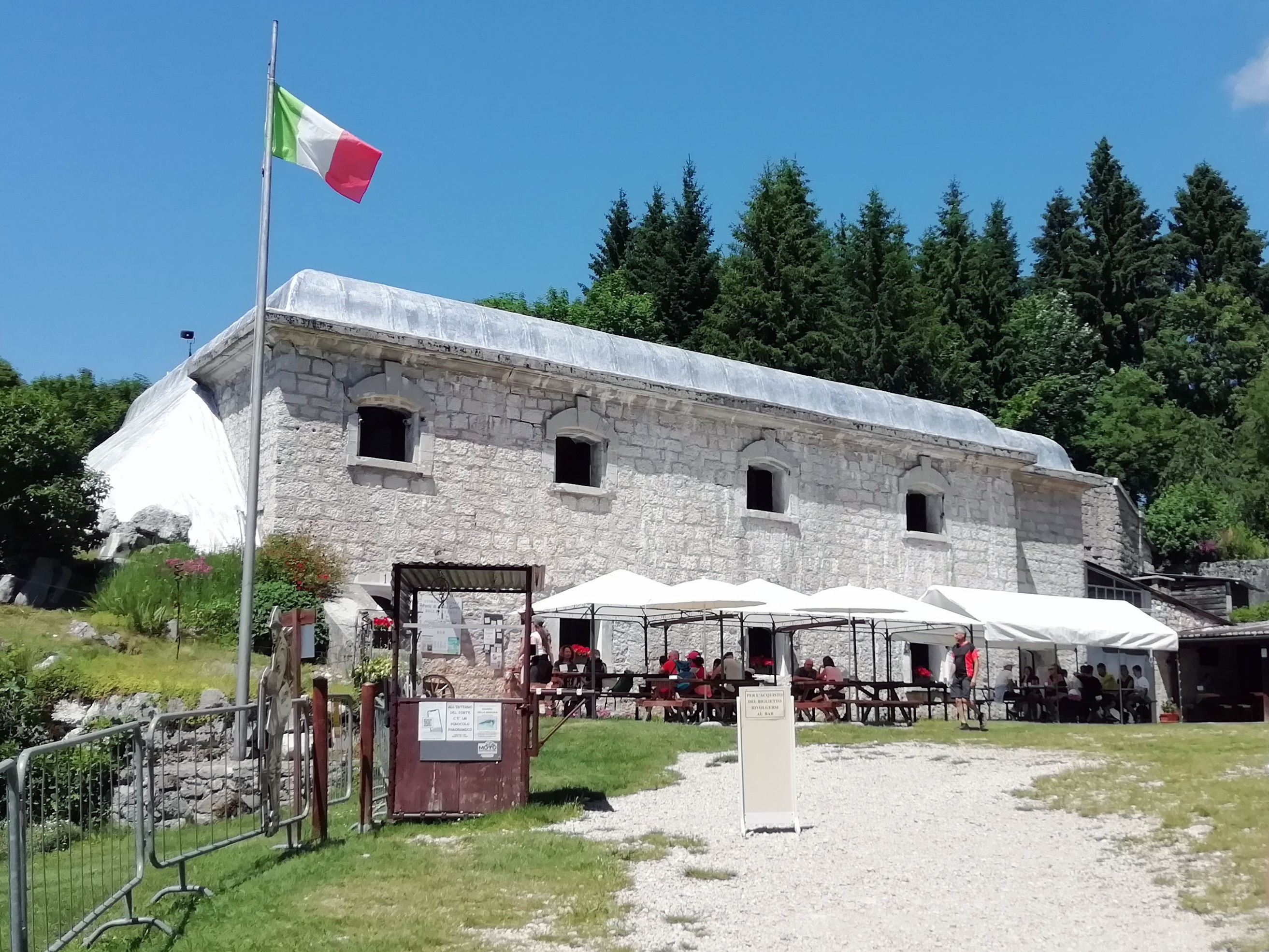
The old officer's barracks is a restaurant now.

For a few years after the war, Fort Corbin was used to house troops during training. It was later put under the ownership of the Forestry Corps when the extraction of the metals was being undergone. In 1942, Corbin was bought by Emilio Panozzo. Corbin was used to house Panozzo’s livestock while they grazed nearby. The first restoration was started in the 1980s, and ultimately the fort was cleaned up and turned into a museum by the owners without financial help. Unlike many WWI museums, Corbin is still owned and operated by the family of Emilio Panozzo. Today the command house houses a restaurant. Fort Corbin is featured in the 2022 game Isonzo.
