= Forte Tombion =

Building in Cismon del Grappa, Italy

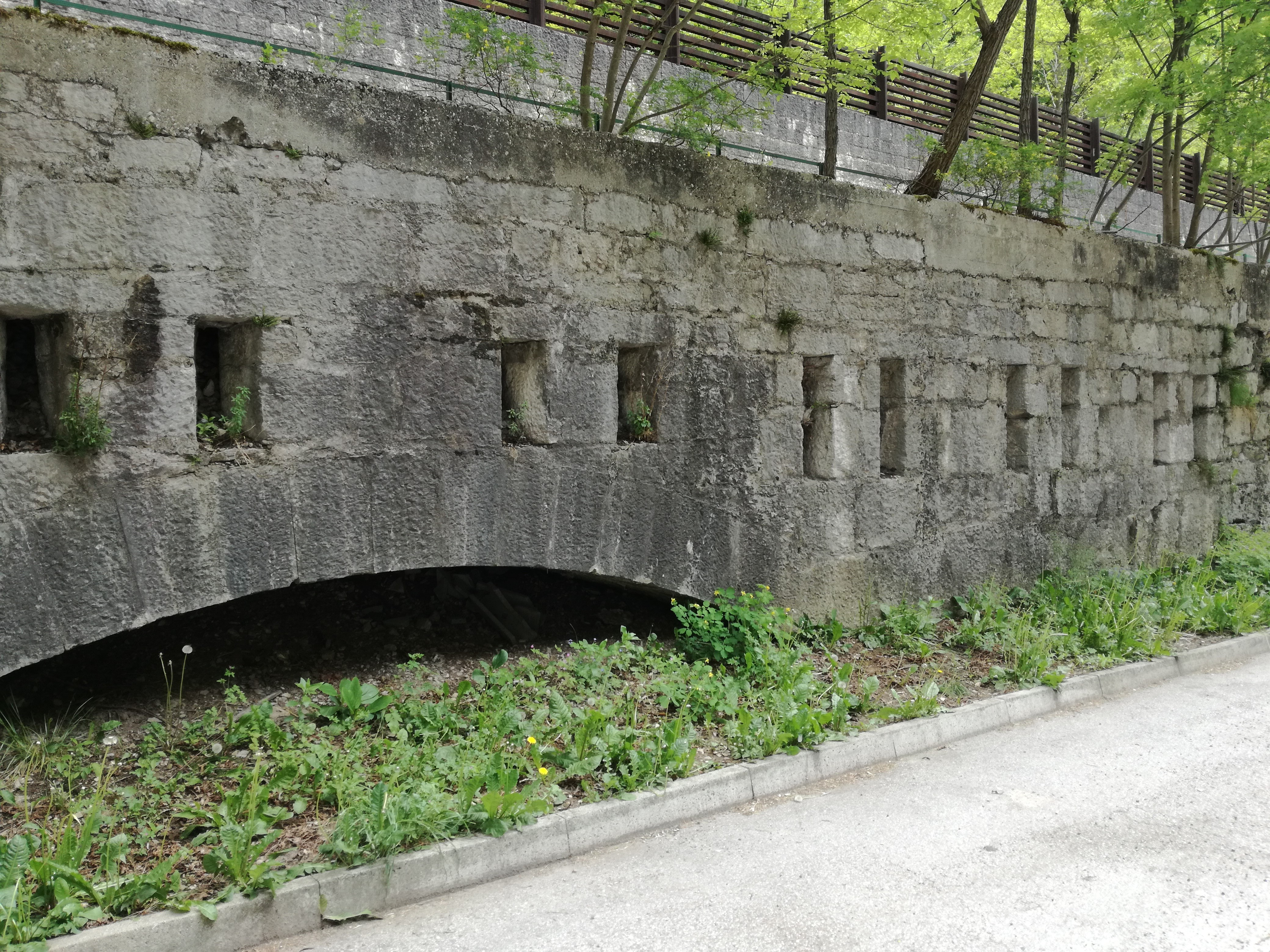
A wall of rifle embrasures.

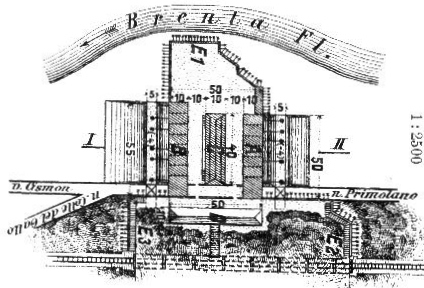
A schematic of the fortification.

Fort Tombion is an Italian fortification that’s part of the Brenta-Cismon barrier in northern Italy. Tombion is located 1 km (0.62 mi) away from the municipality of Cismon del Grappa, in the Brenta Valley. The fort was built at the narrowest point in the valley, between a railroad tunnel and sheer cliffs overlooking the Brenta River. Tombion was built out of local limestone, which while it was typical of the time, it made Tombion obsolete as artillery progressed.

== World War I ==
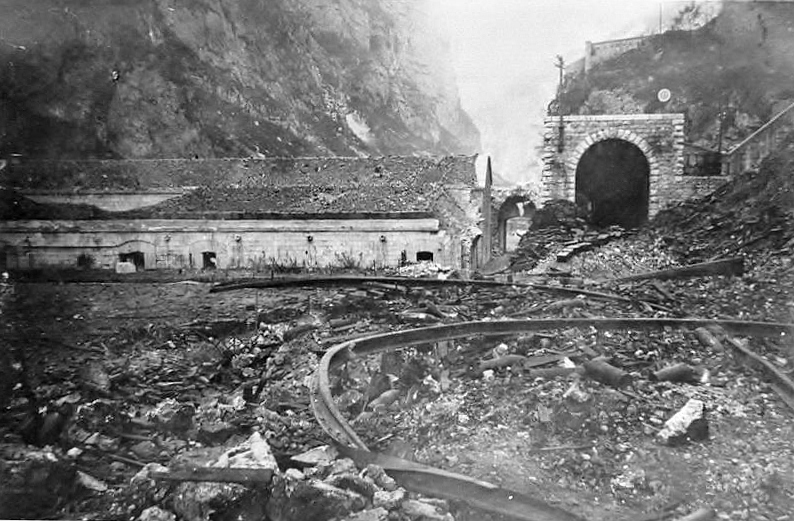
The demolished railway tracks after the Austro-Hungarians occupied the fort.

During the Battle of Asiago in 1916, there were fears of an Austro-Hungarian breakthrough and the fort was activated. The Austrian breakthrough never came and the fort was returned to being a rear-ward position and supply depot. The fort was decommissioned on Nov. 23, 1916, and was replaced by Forte Tagliata della Scala. The fort sat dormant until Nov. 13, 1917 when following the Battle of Caporetto, the Brenta valley was ordered to be blocked by the “Piva” column. The road and casemates were destroyed by Italian engineers, but as the railway tunnel was being wired up, the Austrians fired their machine guns from the heights overlooking the fort and killed several engineers and threw the rest into panic. The order was immediately issued to set off the explosives, but only a few exploded and Tombion was captured by the Austro-Hungarians. The Austrians quickly restored the fort and road, and for the rest of the war Tombion was used as a field hospital.

== World War II ==
On Sept. 8, 1943, a garrison from the Italian Socialist Republic occupied the fort. On the night of July 6-7, 1944, the partisan brigade “Bruno”, supported by the British SOE, assailed the fort. The partisans successfully entered the fort and neutralized the garrison, taking explosives from the fort in the process to blow up the railway tunnel nearby, which was out of commission for the next 40 days. With extreme caution, the partisans “liberated” hand grenades made in WWI to blow up the Bassano-Trento railway tracks near Primolano. Nearby the fort during the winter of 1944-45, the partisans derailed several locomotives and caused them to fall into the Brenta River.
