= Battle of the Col Basson =

Battle in 1915 on the Italian Front during the First World War

- Part of the Italian Front; World War I
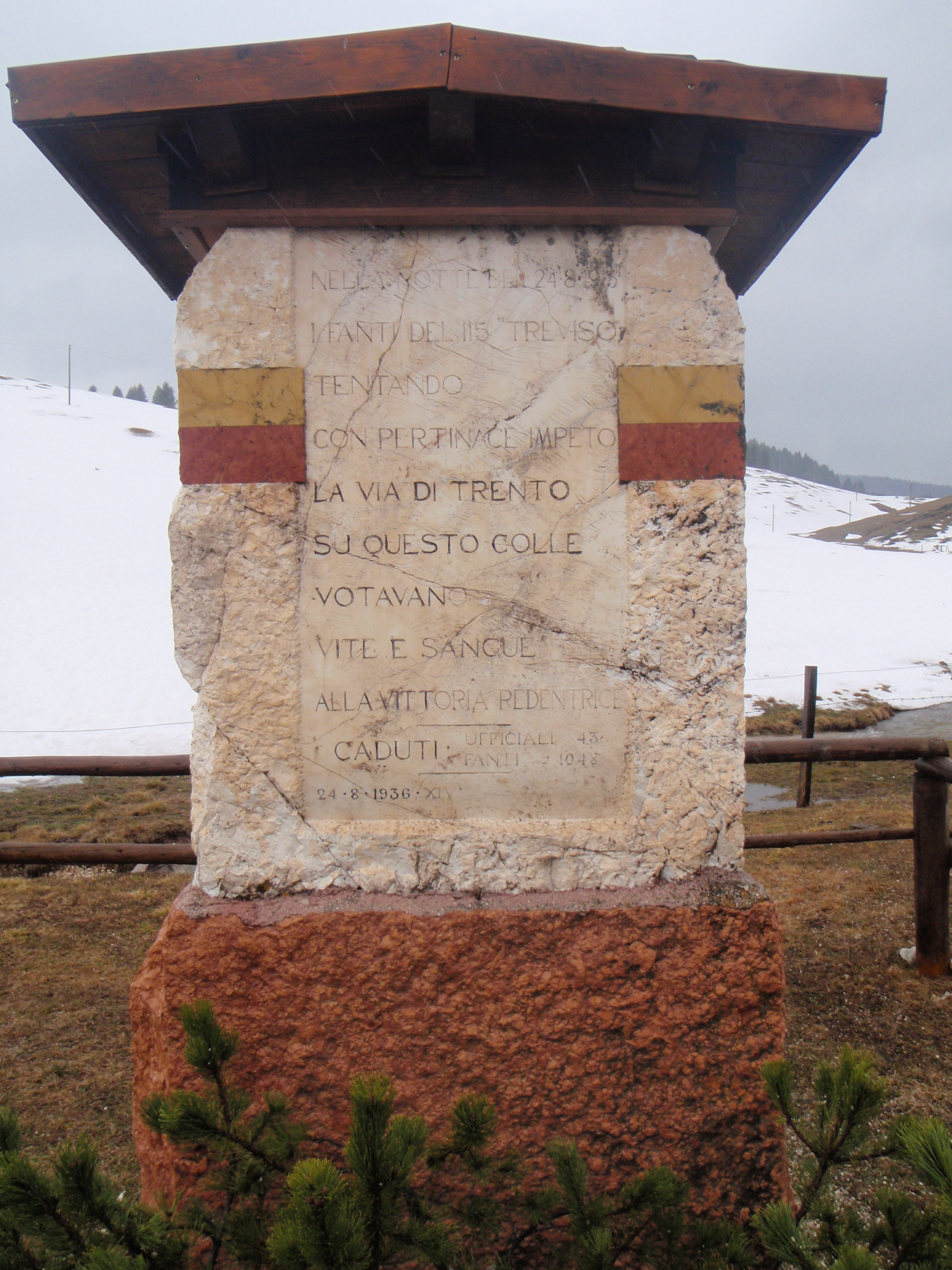
- Plaque commemorating the fallen of the Battle of Col Basson
Date	24–25 August 1915
Location	Piana Di Vezzena
Result	Austro-Hungarian victory

Belligerents
Italy	Austria-Hungary

Commanders and leaders
(Kingdom of Italy) Pasquale Oro	(Austria-Hungary) Otto Ellison von Nidlef

Strength
Unknown	Unknown

Casualties and losses
Unknown	Unknown

The Battle of Col Basson was fought on the Piana di Vezzena during the First World War between the Italian army and the Austro-Hungarian.

== Battle ==
Between 24 and 25 August, after an intense bombardment lasting 10 days by the Italian artillery, the infantry attack was unleashed on Col Basson. This advanced position located between Fort Verle and Fort Lusern was defended by three lines of barbed wire and with troops belonging to the 180th Austro-Hungarian Infantry Brigade, including various formations of Standschützen and the Upper Austrian Volunteer Battalion.

The royal army deployed, from the Vezzena pass towards the north, the Ivrea Infantry Brigade, the Val Brenta Alpini Battalion and the 63rd Bassano company, the 1st Field Artillery Group of the 41st, the Oneglia Mountain Artillery Group, the 16th Company Genius Sappers. The Treviso Infantry Brigade, a battalion of the Royal Guardia di Finanza, the 2nd Field Artillery Group and the 15th Sappers Engineers Company were deployed in the Basson-Costalta sector.

The Italian attack, conducted by the 115th regiment of the Treviso brigade commanded by lieutenant colonel Luigi Federico Marchetti, who died in the action, failed completely due to the lack of adequate means to overcome the fences, because the Austro-Hungarian positions, even if severely tested by the bombings of the previous days, were still efficient and directed their deadly fire on the entangled infantrymen in the networks. Artillery fire from Fort Lusern was also called in to repel the attack Italians.

Furthermore, during the attack, the Italian army used asphyxiating gas for the first time. The use of this new weapon was done in a clumsy manner, so much so that for about two hours, the Italian artillery fired on its own troops who had managed to occupy some Austrian trenches. At 6.00 in the morning of 25 August the Italians had penetrated, albeit with serious losses, into the front part of the Basson outpost, but an Austrian counterattack, led by Colonel Otto Ellison von Nidlef, allowed the Austrians to regain lost positions. For this action Ellison was decorated with the Knight's Cross of the Military Order of Maria Theresa

The remaining Italian troops, given the impossibility of falling back to the initial positions of Monte Costesin due to the barrage from the Verle and Luserna forts and the Costalta batteries which would have mowed them down, surrendered in large numbers. Among these was Colonel Mario Riveri, who was left injured on the ground.

== Aftermath ==
The unfortunate outcome of this offensive, which took place as part of a much larger operation which involved the sector of the entire V Army Corps, highlighted the impossibility of forcing the "Lavarone Line". The 1st Army, deployed on the Trentino front, had received orders from Cadorna to remain on the strategic defensive and every offensive episode would have had as its sole purpose the improvement of positions where an advantageous opportunity was offered. This tactical level offensive, which nevertheless involved a very broad front (the entire area of the plateaus and the Valsugana), did not obtain any territorial results in the case of Col Basson and cost enormous losses in terms of men as well as a conspicuous expenditure of artillery shells. After this battle no further attempts were made to undermine the line of Austro-Hungarian forts.

From these fortresses in May 1916 the Austrians launched the Spring Offensive, first investing the Costesin (causing over 3,000 deaths among the Italian units) and then heading towards Asiago. From then on, Vezzena will become a rear area.

== Sources ==
- Franco Luigi Minoia (2015). Lampi di stampa (ed.). Grande Guerra. L'assalto al Col Basson. Vignate: Minoia 2015. ISBN 978-88-488-1740-0.
- Österreichisches Bundesministerium für Heerwesen (a.c.) (1931). Österreich-Ungarns letzter Krieg 1914-1918. Vol. 2 Das Kriegsjahr 1915 Vom Ausklang der Schlacht bei Limanowa-Łapanów bis zur Einnahme von Brest-Litowsk (in German). Wien: Militärwissenschaftliche Mitteilungen.
- Riassunti storici dei corpi e comandi nella Guerra 1915-1918 Volume quinto (PDF). Roma: Ministero della guerra. Comando del corpo di stato maggiore. Ufficio storico. 1927.
