= Paneveggio barrier =

Austro-Hungarian roadblock in Northern Italy

Coordinates: 46.3061°N 11.7014°E

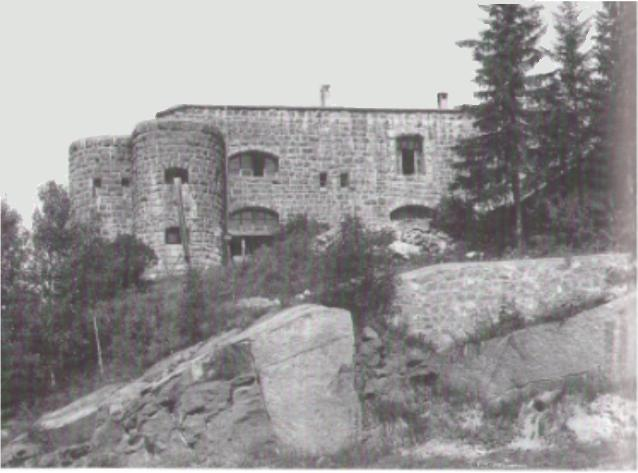
The side of the fort that faces the Italian border because we can see the casemates for the guns.

The Paneveggio Roadblock, also called Fort Albuso/Buso by the Italians, was an Austro-Hungarian roadblock built near the town of Bellamonte in Northern Italy. Paneveggio was built between 1890 and 1895 to block access to the Fiemme and Fassa Valleys. The fort consists of a two-story blockhouse, surrounded by a deep moat. Various trenches connected Paneveggio to Fort Dossacio up the hill. The fort was equipped with four 12 cm guns, with other sources saying six 9 cm guns. The fort was renovated in 1912. In 1916, it was decided to add between three and five smaller field pieces of an unspecified caliber to the fort's defense. The wartime garrison was 4 officers and 134 enlisted men, while the peacetime garrison was 57 soldiers. Paneveggio was also connected to Fort Dossacio by optical signals as well as by telegraph. Supposedly when the war broke out, the guns were removed and placed outside in field positions. This was incorrect however, as these were just tree trunks made to look like guns.

== Post World War I ==
The roadblock is owned by Primiero Energia Spa, who replaced the roof with a metal one. Despite the constant construction, the roadblock is in good condition. Paneveggio is located near the Paneveggio dam. Since the roadblock is in private hands, you must obtain permission to enter.
