= Forte Dossaccio =

Coordinates: 46°28′06″N 10°20′22″E

The fort as of 2020

Forte Dossaccio, also called Forte Venini or Oga, is an Italian fortification built on the slopes of Monte Masucco in the Bormio basin, at an altitude of 1730 m (5700 ft). The fort should not be confused with the Austro-Hungarian Fort Dossacio located near Paneveggio much farther north. Work on the fort was started in 1909 and was completed in 1914, just before the outbreak of war. The construction style of Dossaccio is very similar to the Belgian forts designed by Henri Brialmont. The fort is the only fortification of its group, the Bormio Barrier, to be classified as a fort.

== Armament ==
- Four 12 cm howitzers in 4-centimeter-thick Armstrong rotating cupolas. The guns had a range of 12,800 m (8 mi) and fired a 24 kg (53 lb) shell.
- Four Gardner M.1886 "disappearing" rotatable cupolas with 1 gun each

== World War I ==
One of the Gardner M.1886 "disappearing" machine gun domes from the fort in the Zebru Valley

Fort Dossaccio’s job was to bombard the peaks of Monte Cristallo, and Scorluzzo, in addition to the rear lines behind the Austro-Hungarian forts near the Stelvio Pass. The fort was activated on May 22, 1915, the day before Italy declared war on Austria-Hungary. On June 5, 1915, the fort bombarded the peak of Monte Scorluzzo. Dossaccio continued its bombardment of Austrian positions until the summer of 1916, but with little success. As the front slowly moved away from the fort, the decision was made to disarm Dossaccio. Two of its howitzers were moved to Monte delle Scala, while the other two howitzers were placed near the Pedranzini Pass. The machine gun domes were placed in the Zebru Valley. In May 1918, General Badoglio feared an Austrian counter-attack and ordered that the fort be re-armed to combat such an event.

== Post-war ==
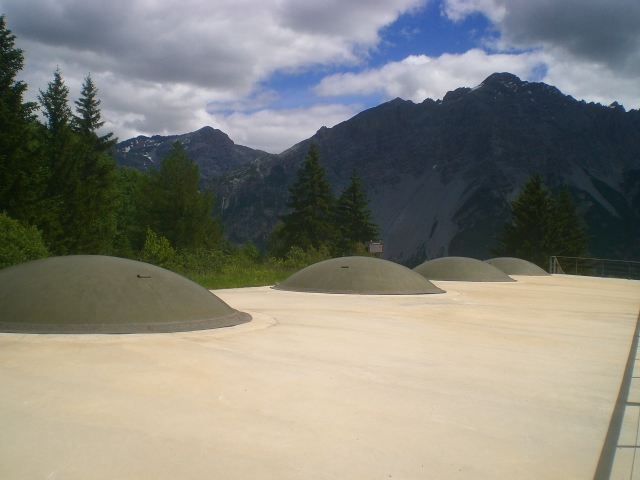
The barrelless howitzer domes today

The fort remained occupied by a mountain artillery unit even after the war had ended. In 1938, the fort underwent major renovations and improvements aimed at making the fort more efficient. The same year, it was included in the XXII GaF sector. From 1946 to 1958 the fort was kept in good condition and was still in active service. In the summer of 1958, the fort was decommissioned, and the gun barrels were scrapped but not the turrets. Over the years the fort has undergone acts of vandalism much the same as other Italian forts. The fort was purchased by the municipality of Valdisotto and turned into a museum. Today, the museum has turned each room into a display that details its purpose. Fort Dossaccio is one of few Italian WWI fortifications that are still in near perfect condition.
