= Forte Tagliata delle Fontanelle =

Italian fortification in Veneto, Italy

The same road that Fort Tagliata Delle Fontanelle was built to guard now runs in front of it.

Fort Tagliata Delle Fontanelle, also known as the Fontanelle Cut, is an Italian fortification built around 1910. Fontanelle was built above the village of Primolano in the Valsugana Valley. Fontanelle's main purpose was to block an enemy infiltration from the Valsugana towards the town of Feltre. The fort was built on 2 levels, and was made out of stone blocks. The fort has a deep frontal moat that is relatively unchanged today, unlike the rest of the fort, which is unrecognizable compared to its former self. Fontanelle was also connected to Forte Tagliata della Scala roadblock by a caponier. Fontanelle was armed with 2 12 cm (4.7 in) howitzers and 2 87mm field-guns.

== World War I ==
Fort Tagliata Delle Fontanelle saw very little of the war due to being behind the lines a decent bit. The only brush with war Fontanelle got was when Italian troops abandoned it in the autumn of 1917, after the disastrous Battle of Caporetto.

== Post-war to today ==
Part of the cleaned up section of the fort.

In 2012, the fort was cleaned up to allow people to enter it and admire it.
