= Fort Leone =

Italian fortification

Coordinates: 45.9998°N 11.6880°E

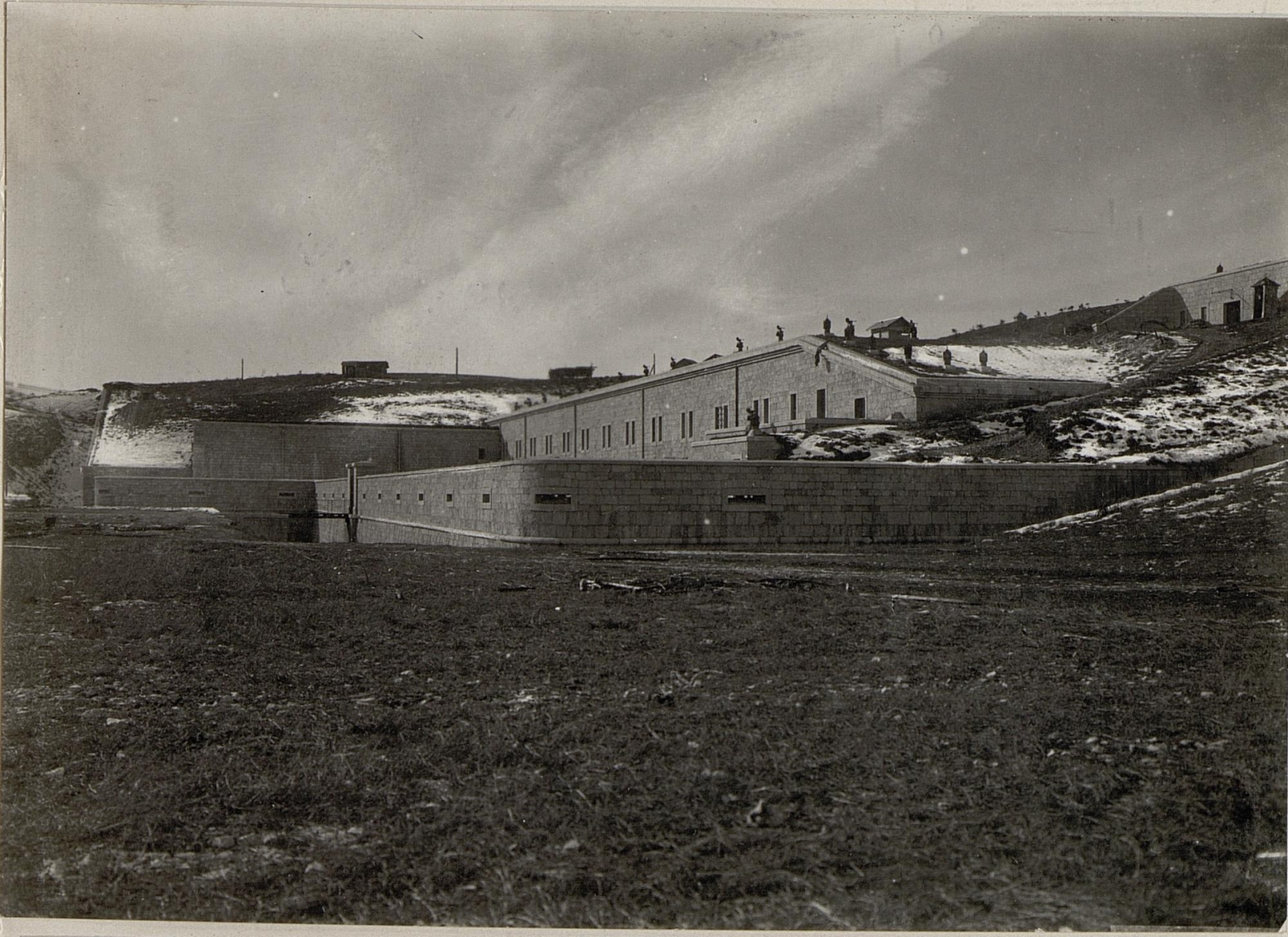
Fort Leone before the war

Fort Leone, also known as Fort Cima Campo, is an Italian fortification built on the peak of Col di Campo at an elevation of 1512 m (5,000 ft). Fort Leone is so high it practically overlooks the Valsugana Valley, which was on the other side of the border when the fort was built. The fort was built between 1904 and May 1915, and is what is called an Armored Fort meaning it was reinforced with steel and concrete. Leone is located 15 km from the town of Arsiè.

== Construction ==
The lower battery is on the lower right, while the high battery is on the upper left.

Fort Leone had a moat that surrounded the whole fort, and a sliding bridge regulated access. The fort was equipped with drainage and air purification systems, which made it one of the most modern Italian fortifications of the time. The fort was built in two sections: the six 149 mm howitzers made up the upper battery, while the lower battery formed the main part of the fort. Deep underground there was a set of tracks used to move ammunition to the guns, in addition to ammo hoists up to the guns. Despite being an Armored Fort, Leone was built mostly out of bricks and stone.

== Armament ==
- Six 149/35 149 mm Armstrong howitzers mounted in 18-centimeter-thick rotating armored cupolas 5 m wide and 10 m apart
- Five Gardner M.1886 retractable armored domes with two machine guns each
- Seven machine guns in casemates
- Six 75 mm field guns in casemates
- One armored rotating observation dome
- One anti-aircraft battery

== World War I ==
The disarmed howitzer domes. Between the two groups of armored domes is a Gardner retractable dome.

Between the end of 1915 and 1916, Fort Leone was disarmed due to inactivity, and its guns were replaced by black logs. By 1917, it had become a warehouse and accommodation for Italian troops destined for the front lines. After the Battle of Caporetto, one of the gun housings was blown up after the gun had been removed. The Alpini battalion "Monte Pavione" occupied the fort and held off the Austrian advance for two days, helping the Italian lines stabilize at Monte Grappa. Eager to avoid more bloodshed, Major Olmi of the Alpini battalion "Monte Pavione", 7th Alpini regiment, communicated his wish to surrender Fort Leone to an Austrian officer of the 164th Landsturm. At 5 pm on November 12, 1917, Fort Leone was occupied by the Austrian 1st Alpine Brigade, taking Major Olmi, 12 officers, and 300 men prisoner.

== Post-war to today ==
Fort Leone under restoration work

Access to Fort Leone was restricted for many years due to the risk of collapse within the fort. Today, the fort has been restored by the municipality of Arsiè, with help from the Region of Veneto.
