= Forte Interrotto =

Coordinates: 45.8973°N 11.4808°E

What remains of Fort Interrotto today

Forte Interrotto, which translates to Fort Interrupted Mountain, is a late-19th-century Italian fortification located near Asiago, below the mountain of the same name. Despite being located below the mountain, Interrotto still stands at an altitude of 1392 m (4,600 ft) and watches over the entire Altopiano dei Sette Comuni (Plateau of 7 Communities). Interrotto was built between 1885 and 1887 and was made out of local stone, significantly weakening it later on. Despite the name, Interrotto was more of a defensible barracks than a fort, and was slightly fortified during World War I. The fort’s armament was two 12 cm guns in casemates.

== World War I ==
On top of the damaged tower is a anti-aircraft machine gun. Other than the hole in the tower, Interrotto does not show any signs of damage from the war.

Fort Interrotto was relatively quiet until May 27, 1916, when it was captured by the Austro-Hungarians. The Austro-Hungarians occupied the fort until the end of the war. During the occupation, the Austrians used it as an observation post for the nearby artillery batteries. Interrotto was also connected to Monte Rasta, just below the fort, where an armored observation dome was installed. The Austrians armed Interrotto with light guns during the war. The damage seen today was caused by Italian artillery.

== Post-war to today ==
The internal structure has been removed in the years since World War I. The numerous square holes are from wooden beams that supported the floors.

Restoration on Fort Interrotto was started in 2004, with the overall goal of removing the vegetation in and around the fort. By now the entire fort has been tidied up and is able to be visited.
