= Forte Lisser =

Italian mountain fort in Veneto

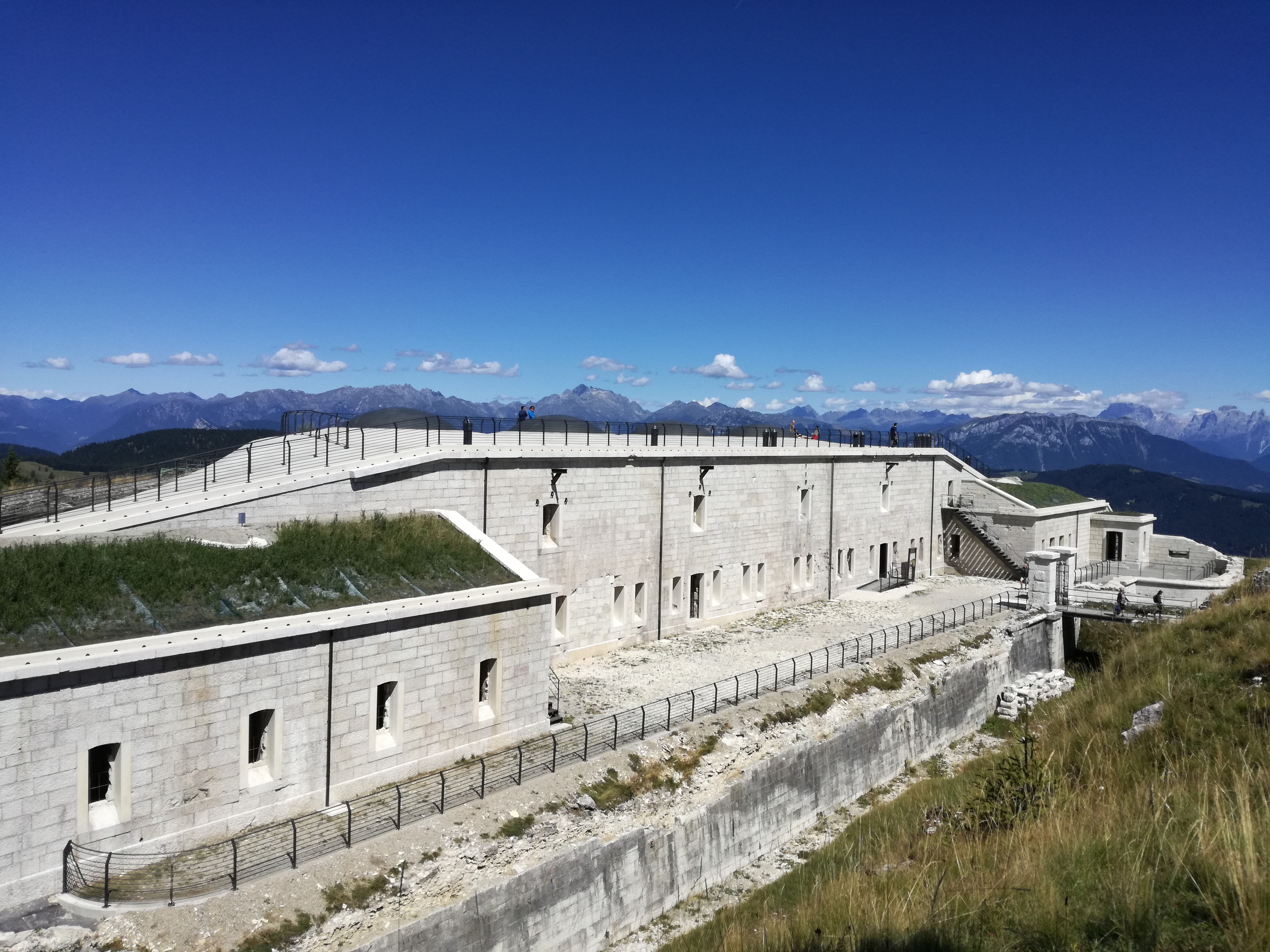
Fort Lisser as of 2019.

Fort Lisser, also known as Fort Monte Lisser, is an Italian fortification built on the eastern end Altopiano dei Sette Comuni (Plateau of 7 Communities) on Monte Enego. Lisser was built at the peak of the mountain, which is an altitude of 1633m (5400ft). Fort Lisser is part of the Brenta-Cismon barrier in Northern Italy. The fort was tasked with preventing an attack down the Valsugana Valley. Lisser was built between 1911 and 1912.

== Construction ==
The fort consisted of a 2 story building not too dissimilar to the forts of the Lavarone-Folgaria group on the other side of the border. Fort Lisser was relatively well equipped when compared to other Italian forts. Lisser was equipped with a kitchen, storerooms, multiple ammo magazines, an ammunition hoist, a generator, a ventilation and air filter system, heating, large cisterns for water, and accommodations for both officers and enlisted men.

== Armament ==
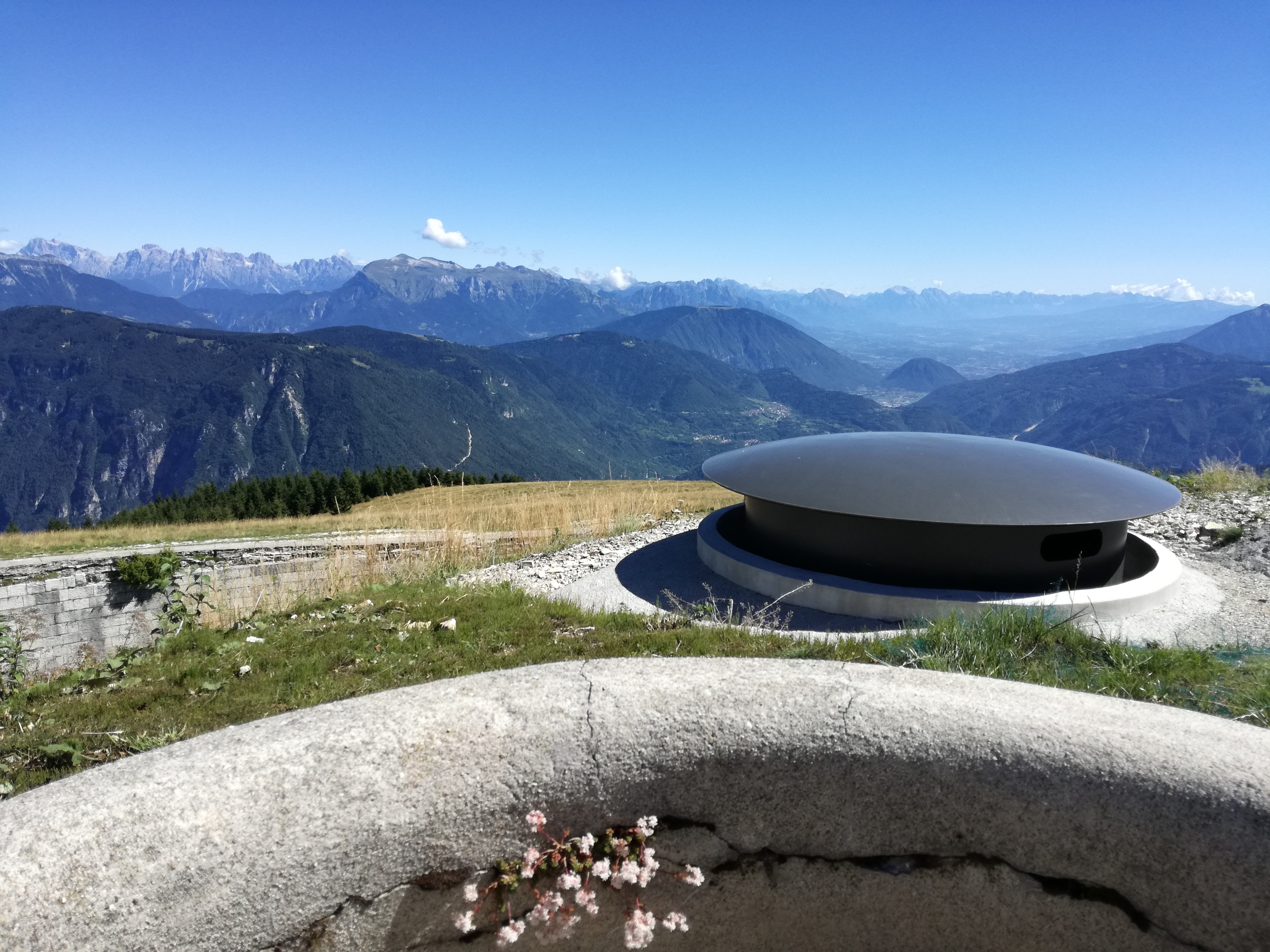
A Gardner "disappearing" armored machine gun dome. Above the machine gun dome is the reason that Fort Lisser was built here, the commanding view.

- 4 149mm Howitzers in 18cm thick Armstrong rotating armored domes
- 4 149mm Howitzers in Gruson rotating armored domes
- 4 75mm field guns
- 4 Gardner "disappearing" rotating armored domes on the top of the fort with 2 machine guns each
- 2 Gardner rotating armored domes with 2 machine guns on the long ends of the fort

The 4 149mm armored domes, shown here without armament.

== World War I ==
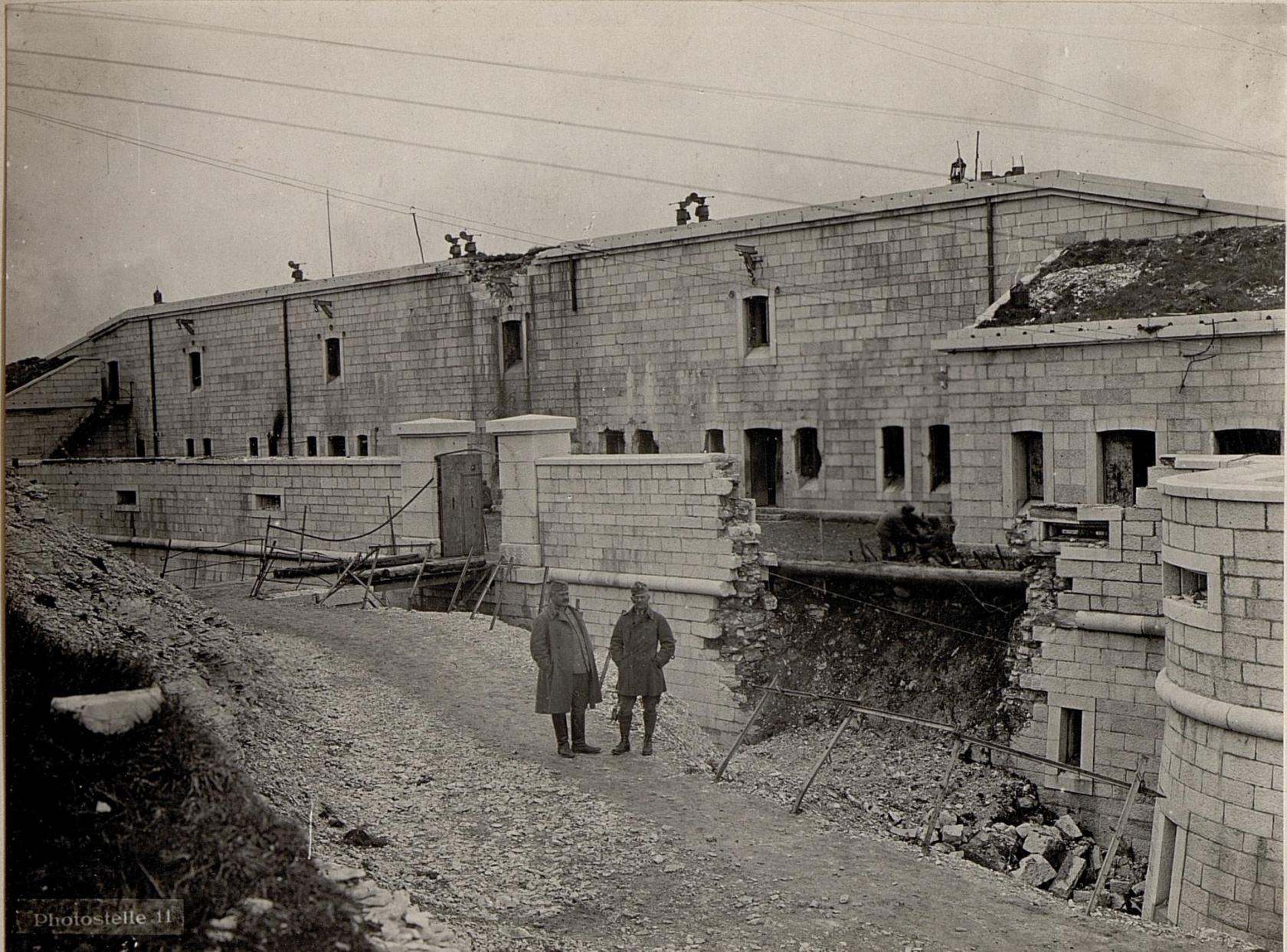
2 Austro-Hungarian soldiers stand side by side outside the damaged Fort Lisser on May 28, 1918.

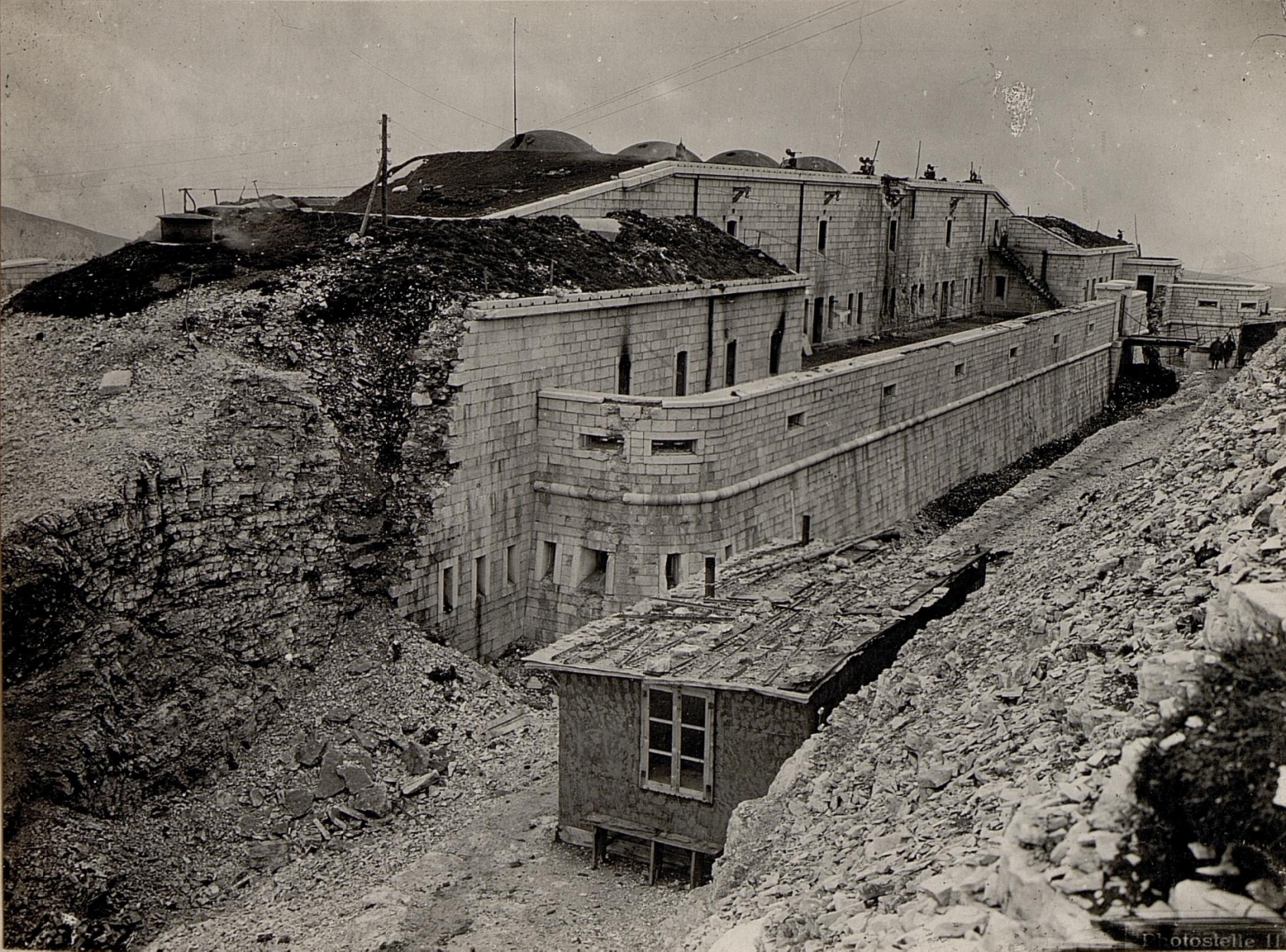
Fort Lisser on May, 28, 1918. the 2 men from the other photo can be seen on the far right.

The fort was quiet until 12:20pm on June 8, 1916, when during the Battle of Asiago, 3 of the fort’s cupolas were struck by 305mm Mörsers. Despite being able to occupy the fort, the Austro-Hungarians decided not to because the fort was unusable. After the Battle of Caporetto in the autumn of 1917, the fort was occupied by the Austro-Hungarians without firing a shot.
