= Forte Casa Ratti =

Italian fortification in Veneto, Italy

Coordinates: 45°50′13″N 11°22′10″E

Fort Casa Ratti is an Italian fortification in the Arsiero sector of the Agno-Assa Barrier in Northern Italy, and is part of the larger Italian fortifications on the Austro-Hungarian border. Casa Ratti was built between 1906 and 1908, and was tasked with controlling the Astino Valley from its position at an altitude of 350m (1150ft).

== History ==
=== World War I ===
The first year of the war Casa Ratti was inactive. Casa Ratti finally saw action in the Battle of Asiago, when at the beginning it was bombarded by the 38cm mortar nicknamed “Barbara” positioned on Costa Alta near Fort Lusern. “Barbara” hit Casa Ratti with 20 shells, but didn’t cause irreparable damage due to Ratti’s position between the folds of 2 hills. The shellfalls were reported by Nahkampfanlage Wiatz, also known as Viaz, since Casa Ratti could be seen from there. On May 26, 1916, the Italians wired explosives to go off but the Austrians defused them before they went off. The next day, May 27, Casa Ratti was occupied by a patrol of 1st Company, sapper battalion 14, commanded by Lt Albin Mlaker. On June 25, 1916, the Austrians retreated, and Lt. Mlaker, the man who would later detonate the mine under Monte Cimeone on Sept. 23, 1916, demolished Casa Ratti to deny it to the advancing Italians.

=== Post-war to today ===
Today, the remains of the moat, observation dome, and the walls are still visible. Above the fort are caves carved into the rock decorated by fezzes and plaques commemorating the Austro-Hungarian 35th regiment who built them.

== Armament ==
- 3 149mm Gruson howitzers in 4cm thick Inspectorate-type armored revolving cupolas.
- 3 machine guns in armored domes and 2 in casemates

== Gallery ==
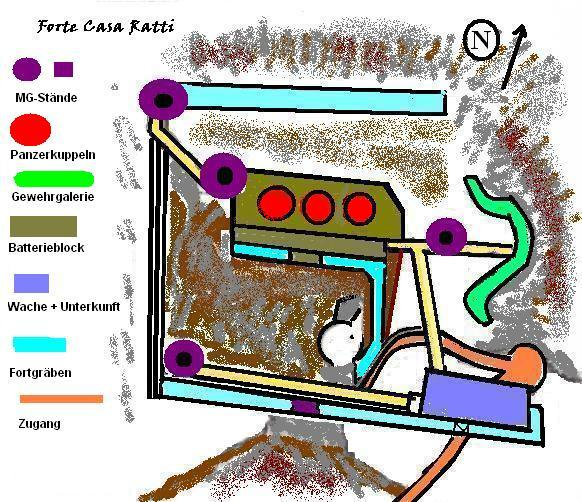
Plan of Forte Casa Ratti

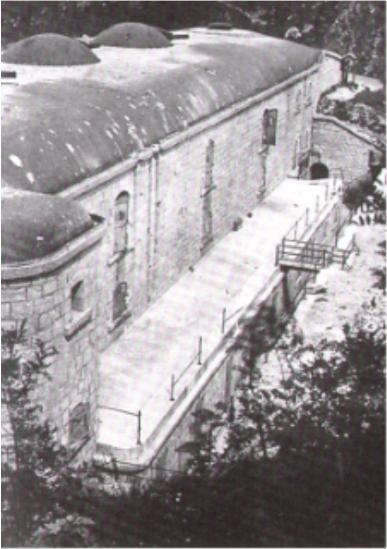
A view of Fort Casa Ratti from just up the hill overlooking it

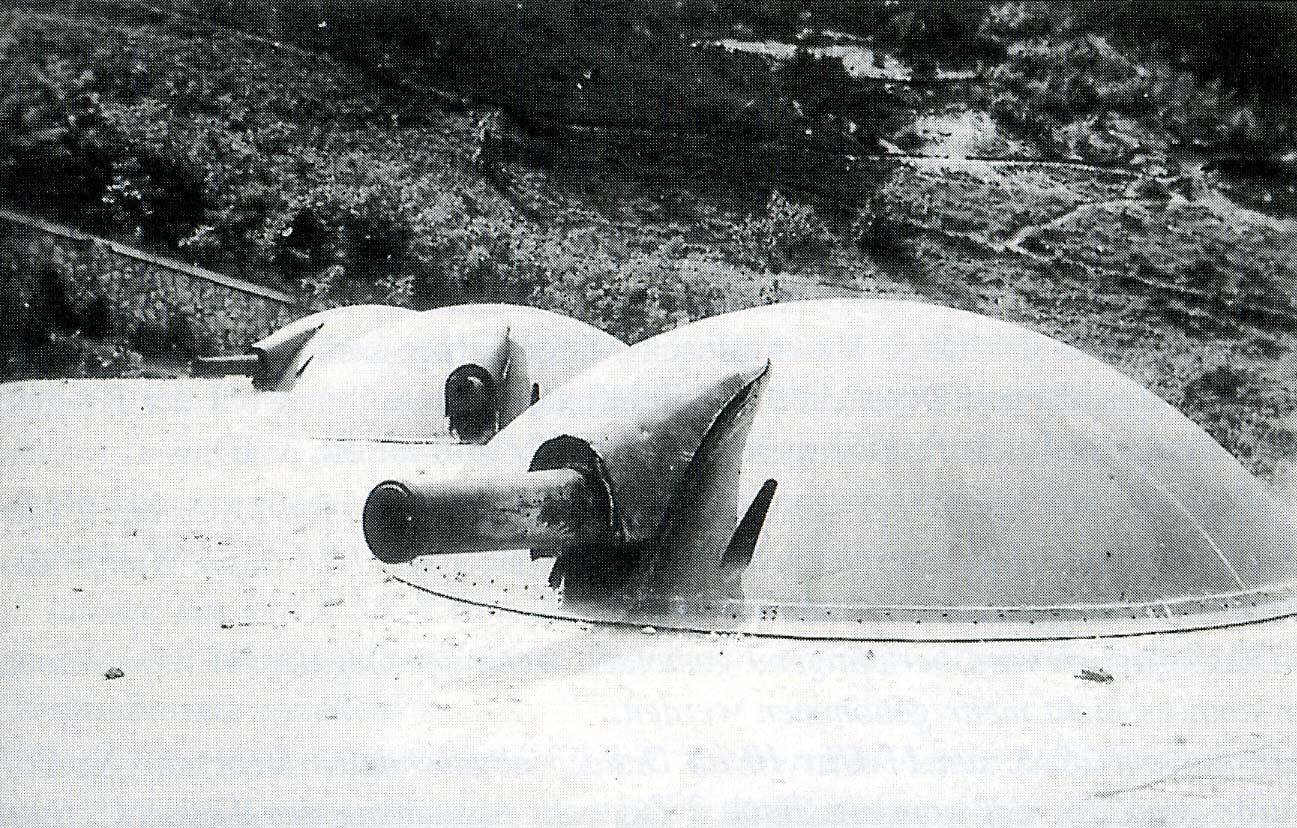
Ratti's 3 149mm howitzers in Inspectorate armored domes.

The man in the middle is allegedly Lt Albin Mlaker. Mlaker demolished the fort in the face of the advancing Italians.
