= Forte Cima Lan =

Coordinates: 46.0098°N 11.7563°E

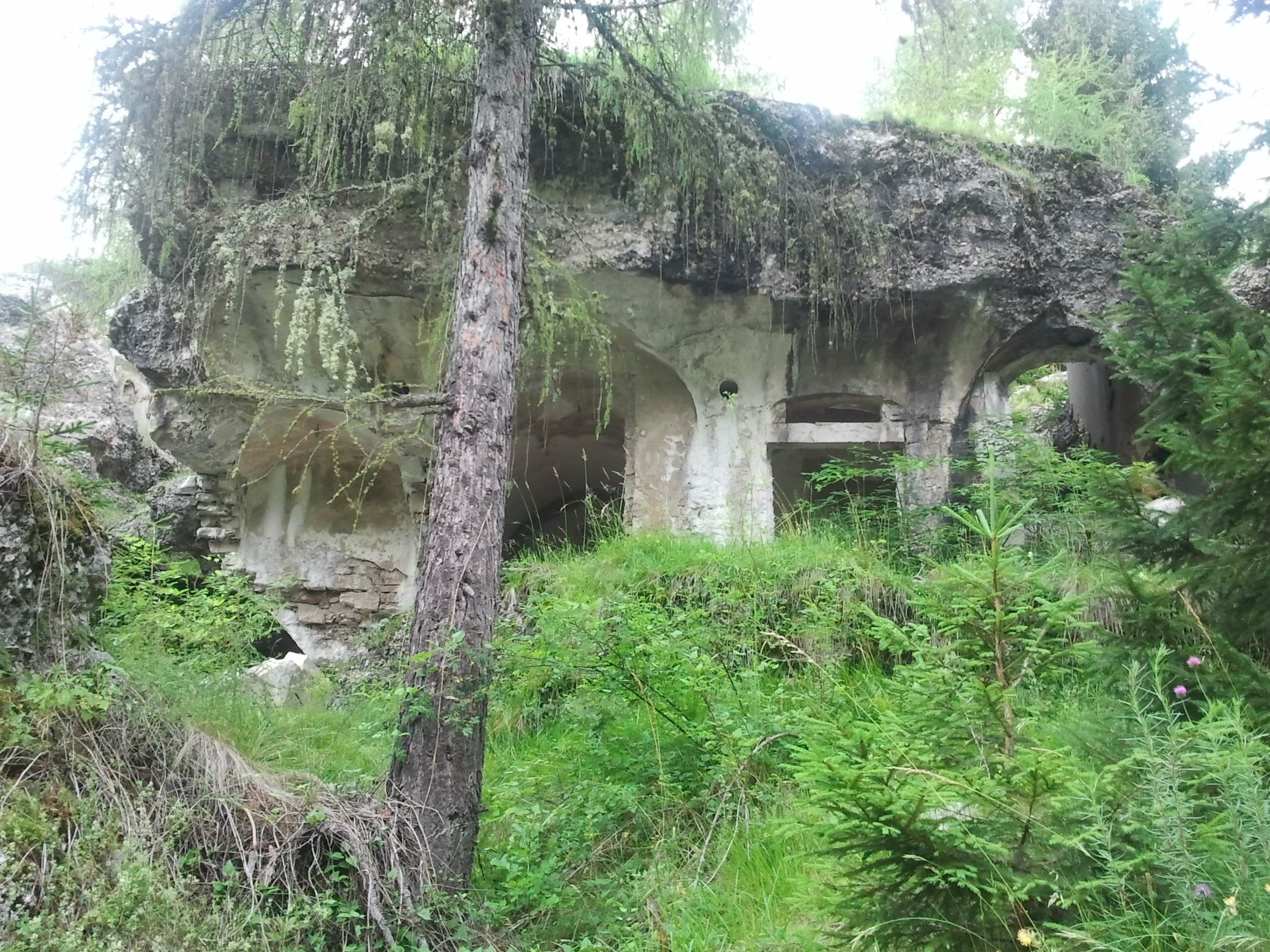
What remains of Fort Cima Lan today.

Forte Cima Lan, which translates to Fort Lan Peak, is an Italian fortification built overlooking the Cismon Valley, where the entrances to the Lamon, Sorrivan, and Zorzi Valleys are. Work was started in 1909 but had not finished when war broke out in May 1915. The fort is built mostly of masonry, while the arches and roofs are made out of concrete.

== Armament ==
- Four 149 mm howitzers in 18-centimeter-thick armored cupolas
- Six to eight 75 mm flat-trajectory guns
- Four 8 mm machine guns

== World War I ==
Fort Cima Lan was part of the Brenta-Cismon Barrier, which was about 30–35 km long, and since it was farther behind the front line, it didn't see use until the autumn of 1917, when the Italian army was in full retreat after the Battle of Caporetto. A small force under Federico Sirolli, called Gruppo Sirolli, held the Austrian advance in check near Serro. Before leaving Cima Lan, a small group of engineers prepared and detonated explosives, completely disintegrating a good chunk of the top of the fort. Today, the fort is abandoned due to significant damage sustained during the war.

The smashed remains of Fort Cima Lan during World War I.
