= Forte di Valledrane =

Itslian fortification in Veneto, Italy

The dilapidated remains of Fort Di Valledrane today.

Fort Di Valledrane is an Italian fortification built at an altitude of 831m (2750ft) overlooking Lake Idro in Northern Italy. Di Valledrane was part of the Guidicarie Barrier, the whole line stretches from Lake Idro to the heights above Capovalle, which was about 7–9 mi (11–14 km). The fort was one of the largest Italian fortifications ever built, and follows the natural curves of the hills. Di Valledrane was large enough that it has been compared to the massive Austro-Hungarian Fort Verle. Like Fort Verle, Di Valledrane was built on multiple terraced levels and the guns are in groups of 2 on 3 levels.

== Armament ==
- 6 149mm Armstrong howitzers in armored domes
- 1 rotating observation dome

One of the 149mm howitzer dome mounts today.

== World War I ==
Fort Di Valledrane was used heavily during the opening days of the war in May 1915, but ultimately met the same fate as many other forts, being disarmed and losing importance to the Italians.

== Post-war ==
Some graffiti in a half-caponier.

After the war, Di Valledrane was decommissioned from the Army and was abandoned. Although the fort never suffered war damage, the damage we see today is from the work of steel salvagers in the 1930s. We can still see 2 of the 3 caponiers today (The 3rd was demolished in the ‘30s). The fort has been vandalized, like many Italian forts. Recently, the fort has been cleared of vegetation and you’re able to enter, with extreme care though.
