= Forte Campolongo =

Italian fortification in Veneto, Italy

Coordinates: 45°53′20″N 11°23′18″E

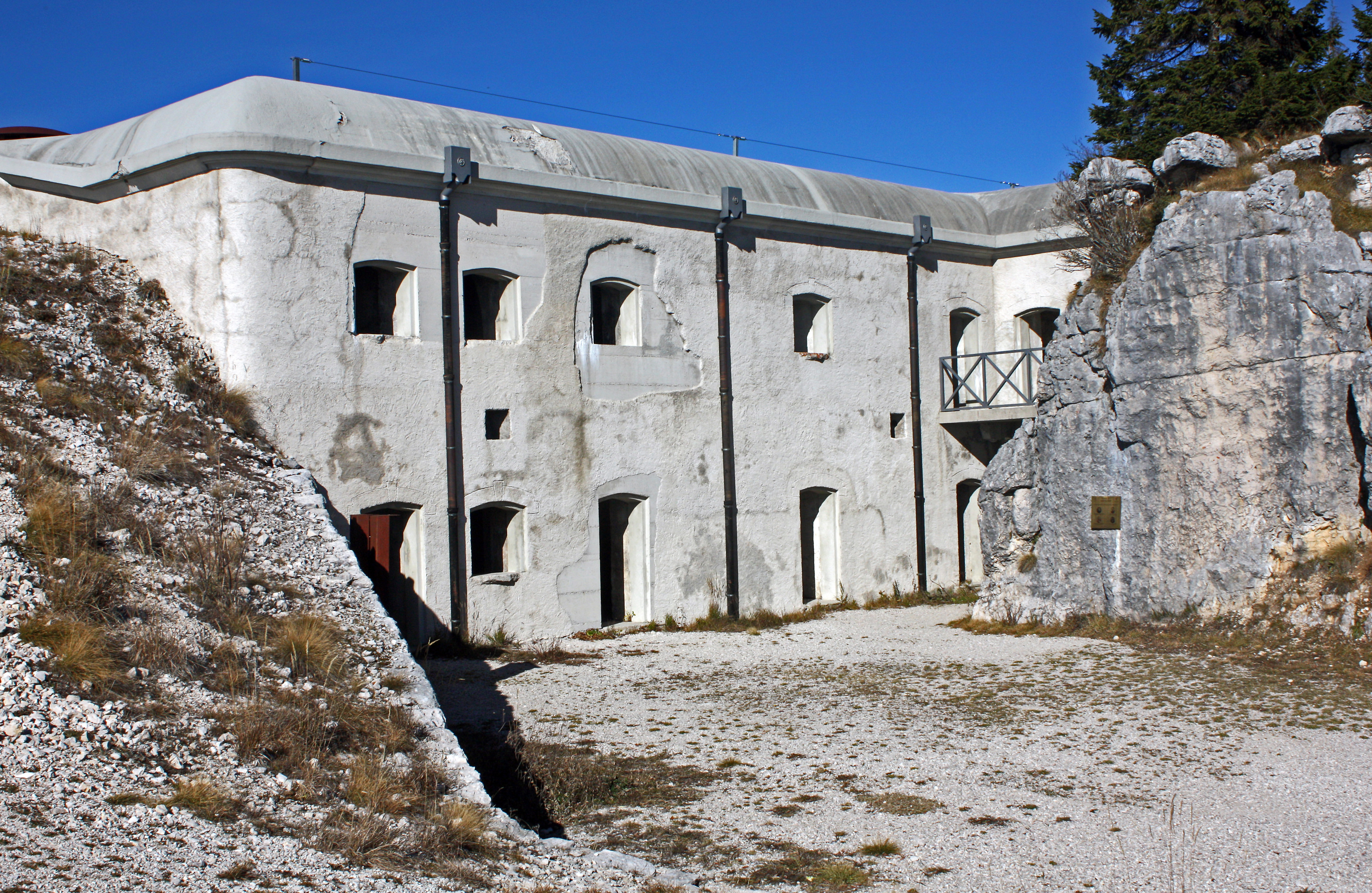
The rear entrance of Forte Campolongo.

Fort Campolongo is an Italian fortification built just before World War I. The fort is built into the sheer cliffs overlooking the Asiago Valley at an altitude of 1,720 m (5,700 ft). The fort was built between 1912 and 1914 and was thus one of the newest fortifications in the Asiago sector of the Agna-Assa Barrier. Campolongo was relatively weak due to being constructed out of unreinforced concrete, which would later prove fatal. Campolongo was built at nearly the maximum range of the Austro-Hungarian guns in the Lavarone-Folgaria Group on the other side of the border.

== Armament ==
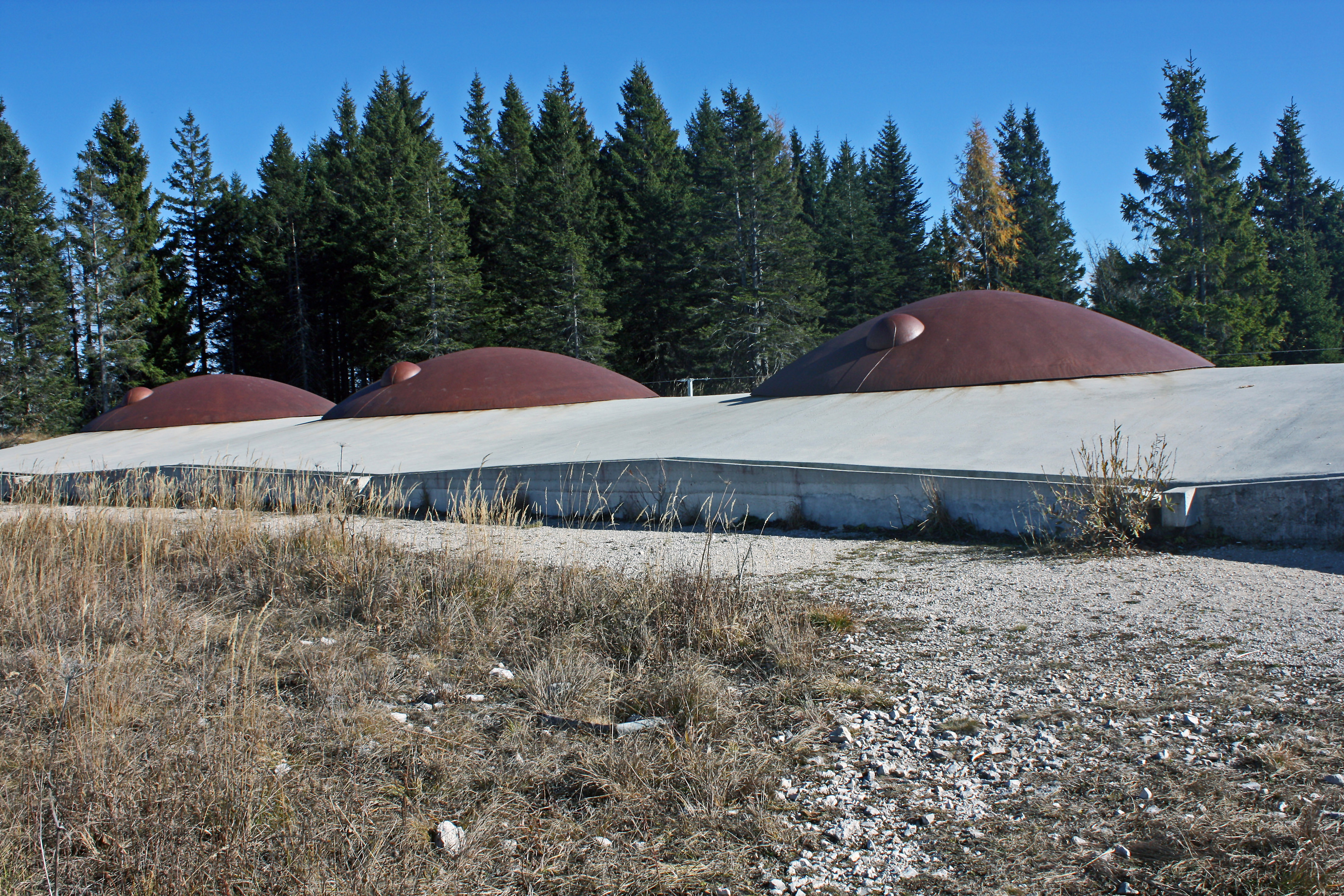
Three of the four 149 mm Howitzer domes today

- Four 149 mm howitzers in 18-centimeter-thick armored domes
- Four old bronze 87 mm cannons
- Four armored rotating machine guns domes with two guns each

== World War I ==
A smashed dome from a 305 mm shell, 1915

In the closing days of May 1915, Campolongo fired at Fort Lusern across the border, to no avail. From nearby Lusern, the Austro-Hungarians fired their monster 305 mm Mörsers back, which on June 12 knocked out one gun and killed the fort's commander and 44 men. The remaining guns were removed, and Campolongo was henceforth of no strategic value. On May 15, 1916, it was bombarded by heavy guns, marking the opening of the Austro-Hungarian spring offensive, also called the Battle of Asiago. On May 22, Campolongo, alongside the nearby Forte Verena, which fired the first shot of the war between Italy and Austria-Hungary, was occupied by the Austrians. For the rest of the war, the fort was occupied by the Austrians; but they made no attempt to arm it, and Campolongo never fired a shot again.
