= Fort Ragogna =

Fort Ragogna, also known as Fort Cavillino, is an Italian fortification located on the Middle Tagliamento, nearly at the peak of the hill of the same name. For a while leading up to Ragogna’s construction in 1909, the Italian General Staff had repeatedly asked for fortifications overlooking the Tagliamento in Friuli. The Austro-Hungarians thought that the fort was the key to the defense of Fiuli, so they contacted Antonio Scagnetto, who worked in the ammo magazine. The Austrians asked for pictures of the area and shell sizes, thinking that it would denote the ways to attack the fort and what it was armed with. The Austrians thought that Ragogna was so important to the defenses of Friuli that they set out to obtain the most amount of information possible. The fort was also meant to guard the Cornino Bridge. The fort was also encircled by a line of trenches that ran along the ridgeline.

== World War I ==
The fort was disarmed in 1915 because of its lack of proximity to the frontline near the Isonzo. General Cardona wanted to rearm the fort, but never got around to it. The breakthrough of Otto von Below's Armies into the Isonzo gave the fort its taste of action, but it wasn’t able to be rearmed in time. Despite the lack of artillery in the fort, 3 field batteries of howitzers were located nearby. Despite this amount of firepower located nearby, the fort was occupied by the 12th Silesian company of the 50th division on Nov. 1, 1917. Several Austrian officers taken prisoner said that the howitzers had inflicted many casualties over the last 2 days.
