= Forte Campomolon =

Unfinished Italian fortification in Northern Italy

Coordinates: 45.8724°N 11.2849°E

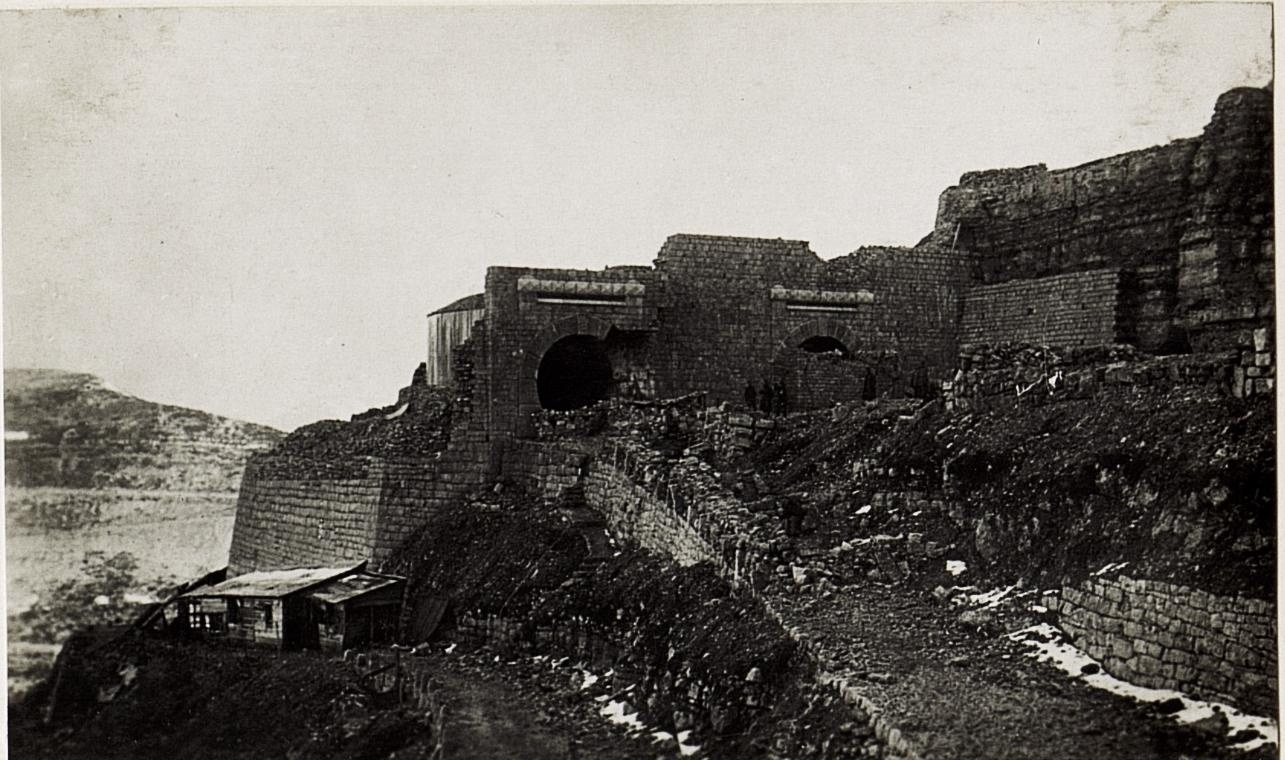
Fort Campomolon during construction.

Fort Campomolon is an Italian fortification located between the Tonezza and Fiorentini Plateaus. Campomolon is located on the mountain of the same name at an altitude of 1,853 m (6,100 ft). Work building the fort was started in 1912, but it wasn't finished when World War I broke out. The fort was built on the Italian–Austro-Hungarian border. To even reach the building site, an access road had to be built because the fort was so remote.

== Construction ==
At the outbreak of the war, Fort Campomolon was almost finished, with only the howitzers needing to be added; the armored domes for the fort were on order from Germany as the war began. This meant that they were placed after military orders, and Italy's refusal to join the war alongside Germany ensured they would never be delivered. The large tunnels seen today are somewhat of a mystery as to their construction, but the leading theory is that they were for rail-mounted howitzers, which could fire and then return to their protection.

In the summer of 1914, the fort was covered in 2 meters of concrete, which it was thought could withstand any Austro-Hungarian shell (Italians didn't know of the 30.5 cm and 42 cm mortars). Campomolon is located about 3,000 m from the Austrian Fort Sebastiano.

== Armament ==
15 cm howitzers located at Fort Campomolon; they were added during the war.

- Four 149 mm howitzers in Gruson armored domes
- Four 149 mm howitzers in Armstrong armored domes (never installed)
- Six 28 cm howitzers (added during the war)
- Four 75 mm field guns (added during the war)

== World War I ==
The 28 cm howitzers after the Austro-Hungarian barrage

Since the turrets were still in Germany, the Italian high command decided to set up field batteries as armament for Fort Campomolon. From then on, Campomolon was used as barracks and an observation depot. During the Battle of Asiago, Campomolon was shelled by Austrian 42 cm batteries which also destroyed the 28 cm howitzers. The decision was made to destroy the fort when the Austrians neared, and almost outflanked, the fort on May 15, 1916. First the guns emplaced outside were destroyed by blasting gelatin, then the fort proper was wired to go off. This task was undertaken by Second Lieutenant Paolo Ferrario on May 19, 1916. In the ensuing blast the lieutenant was killed; a small plaque on the fort's facade commemorates him today.

== Post-war ==
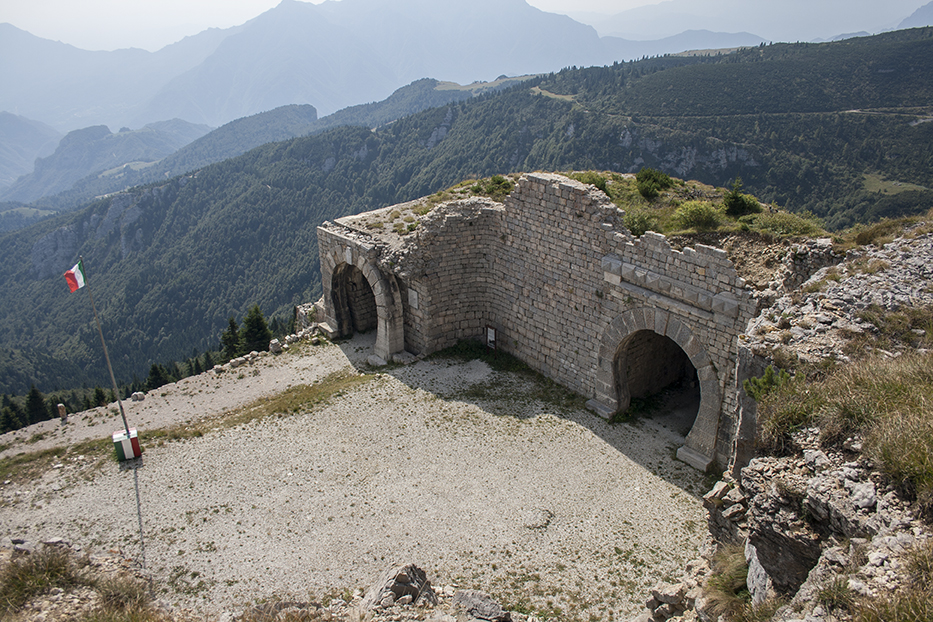
Fort Campomolon today

The fort has recently been renovated so that visitors can see where the original 149 mm guns were supposed to go, and tour the tunnels for the railway guns.
