= Fort Lusern =

Austro-Hungarian fortification in Trentino, Italy

Coordinates: 45°55′36″N 11°20′11″E

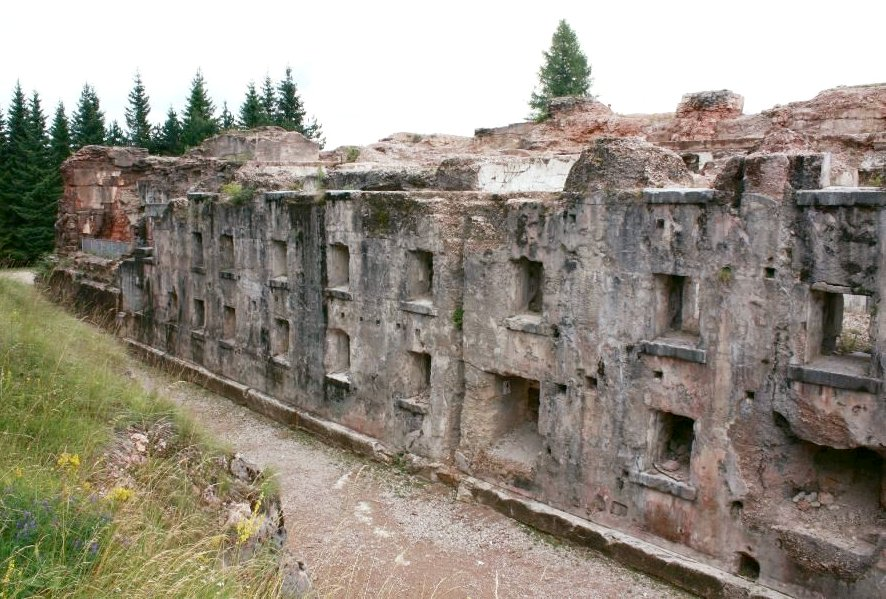
The casemate block.

Fort Lusern (Italian: Forte Campo, German: Werk Lusern) is an Austro-Hungarian fort built south of Trento to bar the way towards the city. The fort was built in the Lavarone-Folgaria group of fortifications, and was one of the strongest on the front. The fort was built between 1908 and 1912, and cost 2.2 million Austro-Hungarian krone to build. The fort was built out of concrete, occasionally reinforced by iron. The fort was surrounded by a moat that was 8m deep and surrounded the whole fort. The fort was built in a Trapezoidal shape with 3 floors, 2 above ground, 1 below ground.

== Construction ==
- The bottom floor consisted of: 2 team rooms, provisional depot, lamp chamber, workshop, depot, engine room, fuel depot, guard station, entrance poitrene, and a casemate with room for 2 MGs for moat defense.
- The middle floor consisted of: 2 gunstands and standby rooms, artillery depot, signal stations, barracks, fuel depot, ammunition well for machine guns, kitchen, provisions storeroom, and a toilet.
- The upper floor consisted of: A fuel depot, commander’s room, 4 barracks, an infirmary with doctor’s office and medical office, ammunition magazine for Howitzer towers III and IV, telephone exchange, standby room for 21 men, and a rotatable observation stand.
- The battery block consisted of: A rotating observation turret, 4 M09 T.H (Tower Howitzers), a standby room (in the casemate), armored dome for 2 machine guns, the ammunition magazine for T.H No.I and II, among other things.

The fort had a small 2-story blockhouse connected by trenches. On the ground floor, it was armed with 2 6 cm M10 field guns, and on the top floor, there was a machine gun casemate that could fire on the front and flank trenches. Meanwhile, there was another exterior fortification outside the fort. This was the Melee facility Oberweisen. This had an armored casemate, with 2 slots for machine guns and a 35 cm spotlight. In addition to the armored casemate, there were 2 other casemates like it but without the 35 cm spotlight. There was an optical signal station and officers' quarters. There was another emplacement like Oberwiesen; this was Melee Station Viaz. Viaz was sparsely armed compared to Oberwiesen, only sporting a single armored machine gun turret. Viaz also had visual contact with the Italian Forte Casa Ratti.

== Armament ==
Fort Lusern and its small outlying fortifications together were armed with:

- 4 10 cm M.09 Tower Howitzers
- 2 8 cm M5/9 minimum ridge cannons as a flanking battery, not immediately noticeable to an assaulter, facing in the direction of Fort Verle
- 2 6 cm M10 cannons for close defense
- 4 casemates with 2 machine guns each
- 3 armored domes with 2 machine guns each
- 2 rotatable observation stands
- 2 rotatable observation stands with a machine gun each
- 3 diagrams for firing with 1 machine gun each
- A total of 19 machine guns altogether
- 4 21 cm spotlights
- The 1 35 cm spotlight at Oberwiesen

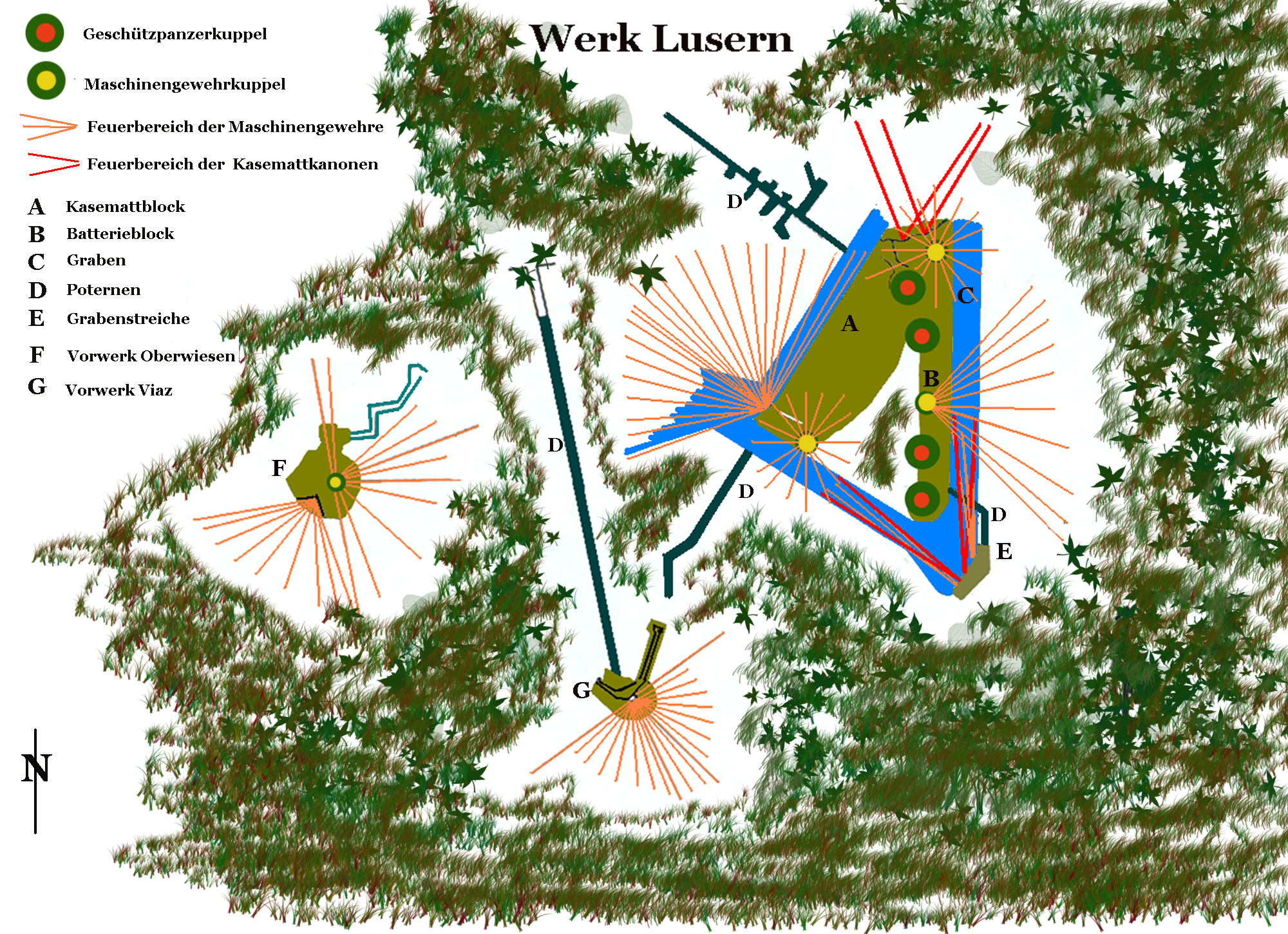
A firing diagram of the fort.

== World War I ==
=== The first barrage ===
In the days after the Italian declaration of war the fort was engulfed by heavy shellfire. From May 25–28, 1915, the fort was fired upon by the 149mm guns of Forte Campolongo, in addition to the 28 cm batteries of Costa del Civello and Spelonca Delle Neve. By May 28, the fort had received 700 28 cm shells and 600 149mm shells. In total, the grounds of the main works received more than 1,000 shells, with 320 hitting the concrete roof, and 4 hitting the metal storage tanks. On May 26, a 28 cm shell smashed through the tower of howitzer No. III, killing 1 man and wounding 2. The next day, a shell struck tower howitzer No. II and lifted the turret out, rendering it temporarily inoperable. Both armored observation stands received shells, with the battery aisle showing cracks and signs of damage.

=== The Nebesar Affair ===
Five days after the fighting started, the fort’s commander, Lieutenant Emmanuel Nebesar, broke on May 28, thinking that the heavy shelling had rendered his position untenable. This is when he wrote a report to his superior, Major Jelinek, who also agreed that the fort should be abandoned without consulting his superiors. When Nebesar received Jelinek’s reply, he sent orders for the guns and parts of the fort to be rendered useless. Subsequently he raised the white flag and began extracting his men from the fort. Once Nebesar’s affairs became known, the brigade command ordered barrages from the forts of Beldevere Gschwent and Verle to strike around the fort to keep Italian infantry from seizing it. The Italians didn't notice the white flag or the artillery barrage, and their infantry attack was repelled from the trenches surrounding the fort. This would become know as the Battle of the Col Basson. The fort was reoccupied by the Austrian crew led by Lieutenant Schaufler. Meanwhile, Patrol Leader Otto Jochler removed the white flag under heavy fire, an action which earned him the Silver Medal of Valor. Lieutenant Nebesar was arrested, and 4 military court cases were brought against him, of which Nebesar was eventually acquitted. He was never punished for his actions of almost surrendering Fort Lusern.

=== Proceeding events ===
The fixing of the damage caused by Lt. Nebesar’s near-abandonment of the fort dragged on until June 13. Although the shelling intensity had subsided, it still lasted until June 30. From that point on, only the T.H of Italian Forte Verena and Forte Campolongo continued firing. From July 28 to August 8, the fort was involved in the shelling of Forte Campolongo, along with a 30.5 cm mortar which ultimately inflicted serious damage on Campolongo. From July 31 on, the fort was covered in baskets filled with gravel to provide protection against shelling. Between August 4 and 15, a 60m long postern (underground tunnel) was drilled under the casemate battery to provide fresh air. This was later widened to include barracks, a telephone room, and ammo magazines.

=== The second barrage ===
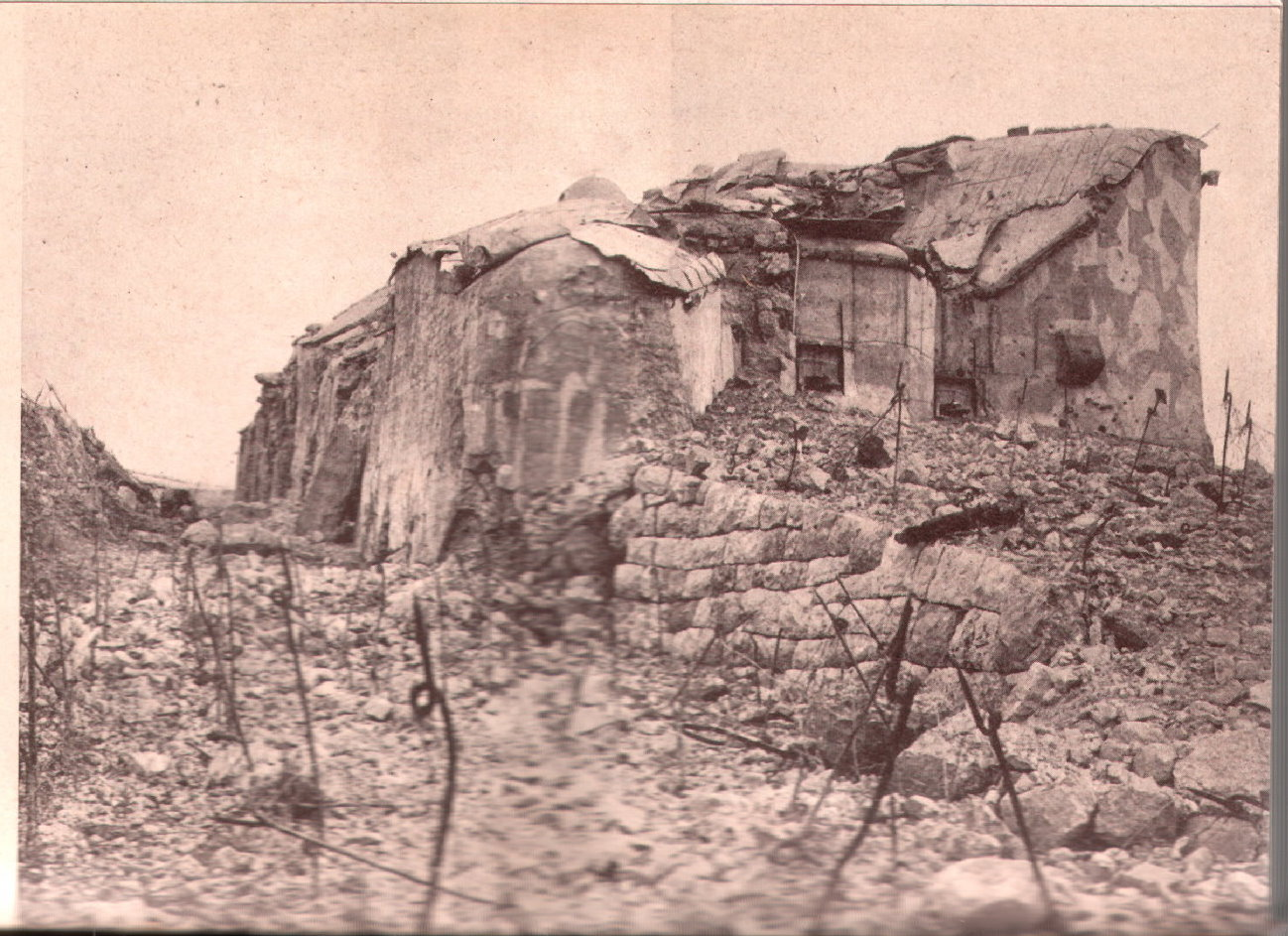
A photo taken from the eastern end of the casemate block. An observation turret is faintly visible in the center of the photo.

The second massive shelling commenced on August 15, with Lusern firing back at the Italian forts of Monte Verena and Monte Angaro. On the first day, Lusern’s T.H No. IV was severely damaged, in addition the leftmost observation turret, which was jammed by a shell. On August 18, a 28 cm shell hit Lusern’s battery block, resulting in 2 dead men unable to be reached beneath the rubble. On August 23, The upper floor ceiling was hit twice by shells, with only a man wounded. During the night, an attempt was made to patch up the holes using quick-drying concrete, with the engineers fixing the holes taking considerable losses in the process. On August 24, a shell smashed through the casemate block, went through the middle floor and exploded in the officers quarters, with the battery commander Lieutenant Solder von Prankenstein being killed. The same day at 10:00am, a shell exploded near the observation stand of the original battery, with splinters coming through the observation slit, killing Ensign Felix Shwefel. The same day, an Italian attack on the infantry barracks at Basson was repelled with help from Lusern’s guns. Meanwhile, the shelling continued and by now Italian 30.5 cm naval mortars had been brought in. Between August 25 and August 31, when the bombardment stopped, 3 shells smashed through the fort's roof. Despite all this damage, the Italians had not succeeded in rendering the fort’s armament useless, with all 4 T.H and the casemate guns still operable. In this barrage the Italians fired over 3000 heavy shells at Lusern alone. One Italian fort fired so much ammunition that over 2000 shells had to be delivered in a 2-week period.

=== Repairs and disarmament ===
After the Italians stopped firing, the T.H were removed to safer positions. The area commander, Colonel Ellison, issued orders for Lusern to be disarmed. Between Sept. 8th and Oct. 16th, T.H No. II, No.III, and No.IV were moved to field positions 200m southeast of Malga Costa Alta, in what would be called “‘Battery Costa Alta’”. The damaged T.H No.III was unusable, and thus was abandoned, being sealed off by concrete. Only T.H No.I and the 8 cm guns remained operational over the winter of 1915-16. 1 of Oberwiesen’s 6 cm guns was moved to a higher floor because rubble had accumulated in front of its casemate. The second 6 cm gun was removed and moved to a field position north of the fort. Even though the Italian forts had stopped their barrage of heavy shells, smaller field guns still fired on Lusern throughout the winter. It was relatively quiet around the fort, probably because the Italians had thought that the removal of the T.H guns was due to the damage inflicted by their fort’s guns. This was not the case however; a serious effort was made to restore the fort to fighting capability. In March 1916, the repaired turrets were re-installed. Between March 7 and April 13, T.H guns No. II and IV were placed back in their housings. Effort was made after these turrets were re-installed to provoke concealed Italian batteries into opening fire, thus betraying their positions.

=== The third barrage ===
The 3rd barrage lasted from April 9 till May 20, 1916. During this time, 860 28 cm and 100 30.5 cm shells landed on the grounds of the fort. This was the situation during the barrage:

- Apr. 10th, a shell smashed through the tower of T.H No.I and removed the turret in 2 parts.
- Apr. 11th, battery ceiling punctured, 2 killed.
- Apr. 12th, the upper floor of the casemate battery was evacuated. The dome of T.H No.IV was removed from its tower, T.H No.II was removed from its housing after receiving an immobilizing hit. The left observation turret was jammed by a 28 cm shell.
- Apr. 16th, the observation turret was removed from its housing and crashed into the front ditch.

=== Damage as of June 1, 1916 ===
- T.H No.I: Tower smashed, armored dome removed from its housing.
- T.H No.II: tower deformed, armored dome no longer rotatable.
- T.H No.III: tower destroyed, armored dome overturned.
- T.H No.IV: tower destroyed, armored dome propelled out of its housing.
- Left rotating observation turret: upright, limited usage able.
- Right rotating observation turret: undamaged.
- Fixed observation turret: unusable.
- Hidden 8 cm battery: undamaged
- Casemate Block: upper floor unusable and cleared after being holed 12 times.
- Melee facility Oberwiesen: guns moved due to rubble buildup, otherwise intact
- Melee Facility Viaz: undamaged

=== The second repairs ===
As the Battle of Asiago pushed the front line to the south, repairs began on the fort. This was all possible because the Italian howitzers had stopped firing to retreat. These are the repairs made to the fort:

- The ceiling of the battery and casemate blocks were reinforced by up to 3.5m of concrete, with some parts of the upper floor being completely filled with concrete.
- The repair of T.H No.II
- The re-installation of T.H domes No. I and IV were completed, but because the turning mechanisms in both turrets were broken, the howitzers were removed and replaced by machine guns.
- The no longer usable T.H No.III was converted into a spotlight stand

Although by Nov. 1916 Lusern’s fighting ability had been partially restored, the howitzers were moved to more safe field positions closer to the front line. The only cannons that remained at Lusern were the 2 hidden 8 cm guns and the 2 6 cm guns at Oberwiesen.

=== Statistics ===
- Dead crew: 23
- Shells landed on the fort’s grounds
  - 28 cm: 5,463
  - 30.5 cm: 725
- Hits on towers: 50
- Hits on T.H domes: 20
- Hits on observation domes: 5
- Shell penetrations through ceilings: 16
- Ammunition consumption
  - 10 cm shells: 11,308
  - 8 cm shells: 5,161
  - 6 cm shells: 148

== Post-war ==
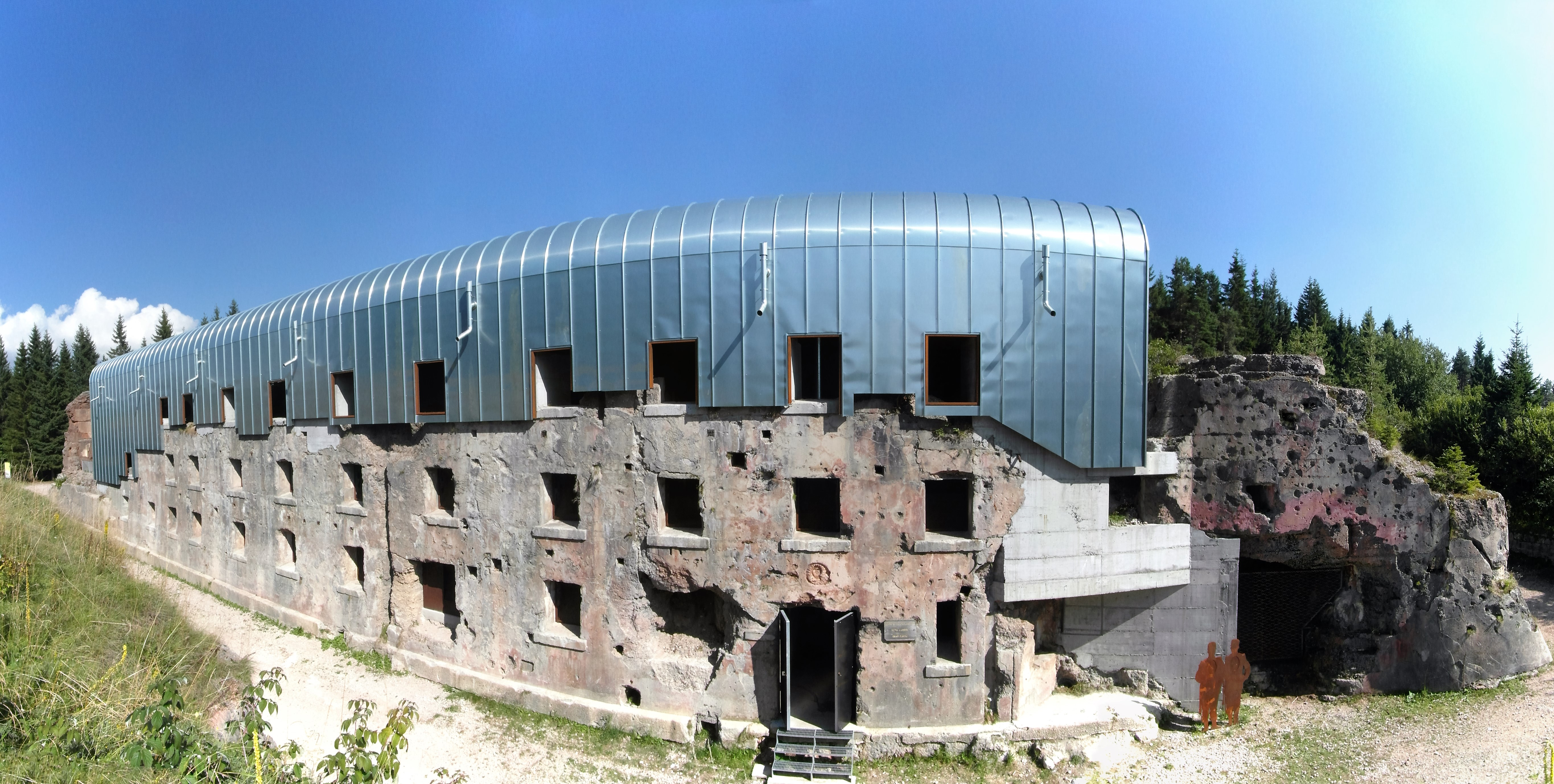
A newer picture of the casemate battery.

Fort Lusern was not involved in any fighting the rest of the war. After the war, the Italian Army was given control of the fort, which was sold in 1927. Due to the steel embargo imposed by the League of Nations because of Italy’s invasion of Ethiopia, the fort was salvaged for steel. The extraction of steel began on June 3, 1935, with the battery block and the upper floor of the casemate block, along with the facilities at Oberwiesen and Viaz being demolished. Since 1990, the municipality of Luserna and the Labor Office of Trento have undertaken extensive efforts to uncover the fort and the facilities Oberwiesen and Viaz. As a result, some parts of Fort Lusern are open to the public.
