= Fort Dossacio =

Coordinates: 46.3041°N 11.7237°E

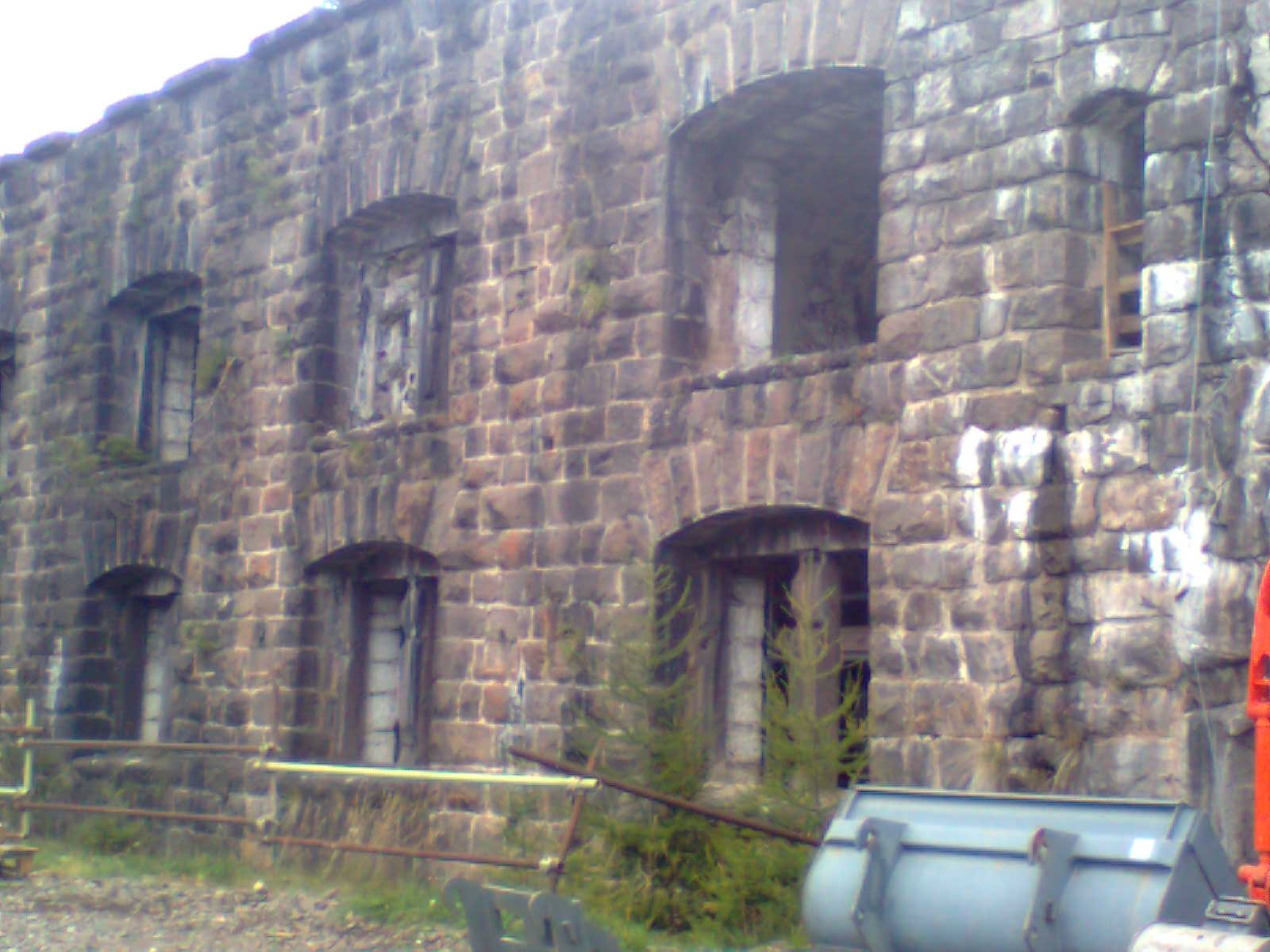
Part of the casemate battery

Fort Dossaccio is an Austro-Hungarian fort built near the town of Paneveggio. Together with the Paneveggio Roadblock, Dossaccio had the job of barring the Fiemme and Fassa Valleys as well as the Rolle pass. Fort Dossaccio was built between 1886 and 1900 and was renovated in 1912. The fort was surrounded by a deep ditch and a 40-foot-wide stretch of barbed wire. The fort was fully self-sufficient, with numerous storerooms, housing, ventilation, and a rainwater-catching basin.

The fort was armed with four 10 cm howitzers, four 12 cm guns in casemates, and twelve machine guns. Although the fort was renovated in 1912, it was disarmed in 1915 because the guns were more useful closer to the front. The Autonomous Province of Trento has restored the interior of the fort. Thanks to their restoration, the public can now tour the fort.
