= Forte Tagliata della Scala =

Fort Tagliata Della Scala, also known as the Scala Cut, is an Italian fortification located overlooking the town of Primolano in the Valsugana Valley in Northern Italy. As soon as the area near Primolano was incorporated into the Italian empire in 1866, the need for fortifications to guard the Brenta Canal was realized. Scala is part of the Brenta-Cismon Barrier of fortifications along the Austro-Hungarian border. The fort was built between 1892 and 1904, and was built out of stone, weakening it in the future. Scala was built with two floors, one of which was partially underground, of which the underground floor has eight rooms. The fort is connected to Forte Tagliata delle Fontanelle by a postern.

Part of the fort today.

== Armaments ==
- 6 M.87 12cm howitzers in casemates
- 2 75mm Armstrong field guns in casemates
- 2 12cm howitzers in casemates
- 2 Schwarzlose machine guns

== World War I ==
The only war Scala ever saw was when it was evacuated by Italian troops in the autumn of 1917, after the Battle of Caporetto.
