= Monte Zovetto =

Mountain in northern Italy

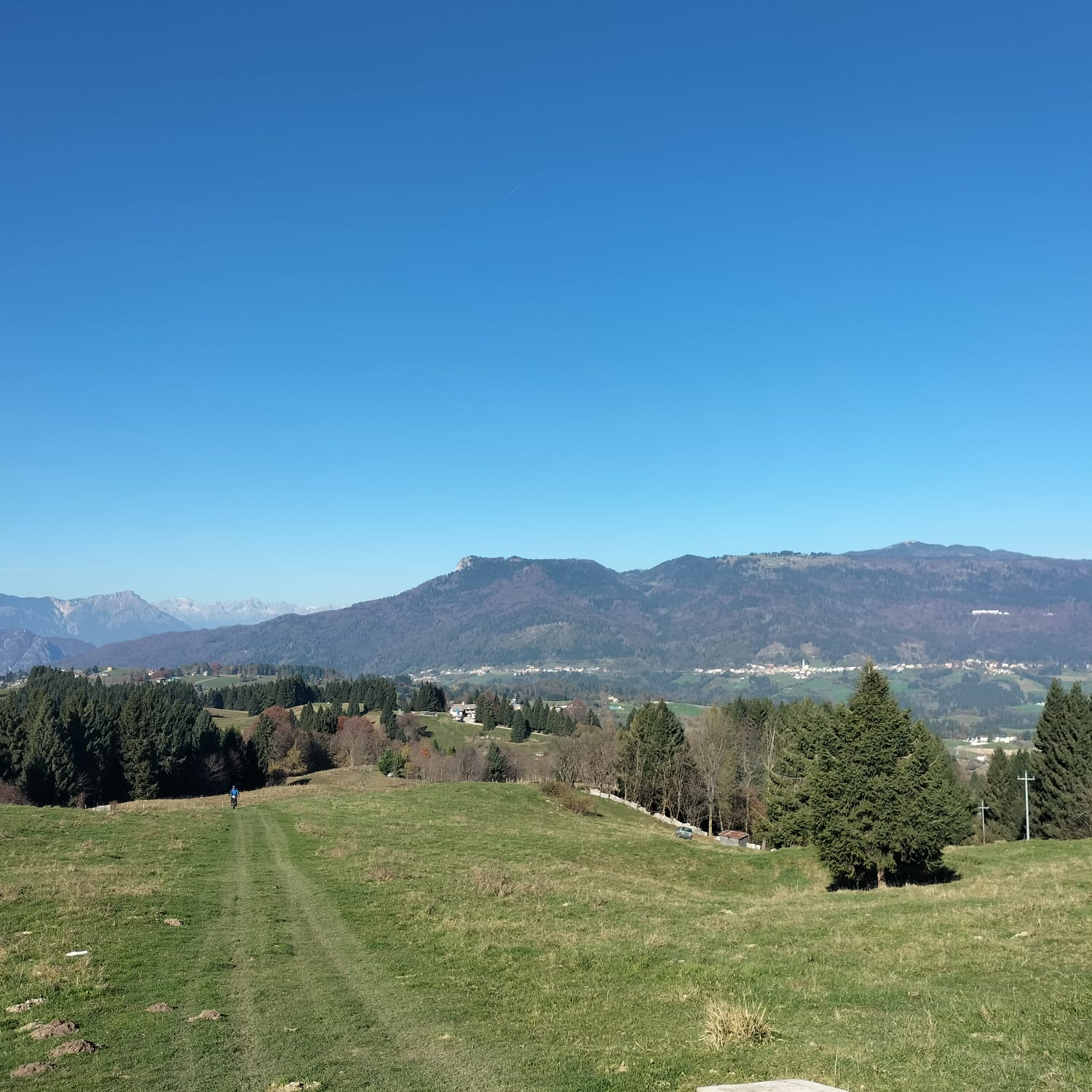
- Monte Zovetto

Highest point
- Elevation: 1,232 m (4,042 ft)
- Coordinates: 45°50′04″N 11°27′39″E

Geography
- Location within Alps Location within Italy Location within Europe
- Location of Monte Zovetto
- Location: Roana,Vicenza (VI)
- Country: Italy
- Parent range: Vicentine Alps

Geology
- Rock age: Unknown

Monte Zovetto (Mount Zovetto) (BrE: /ˌmɒntɪ.dzɒˈvɛt.tɒ)/ is a mountain in the Pre-Alps, more specifically within the Vicentine Alps, in the northern Italian region of Veneto. It has a summit elevation of 1,232 m (4,042 ft) above sea level. The area is known for various activities such as hiking and mountain biking. It also hosts several archaeological sites related to World War I, including British trench warfare sites.

== Geography ==
Monte Zovetto lies within the municipality of Roana (in the province of Vicenza), one of the seven municipalities that make up the Asiago Plateau, with a population of approximately 4,299 residents. The closest locality is Cesuna, in the municipality of Roana. The northern face overlooks Mount Ceramella, while its eastern side provides views of the Magnaboschi Valley and Mount Lemerle. On the western side, it faces Mount Busibollo (1162 m, 3812 ft).

== Geology ==
=== Triassic Period (about 250–200 million years ago) ===
The geological foundation of Monte Zovetto dates back to the Late Triassic, a period during which the first stages of sedimentary deposition occurred in the area. At this time, the region was submerged in a shallow sea, which facilitated the deposition of dolomites and limestone, forming the base of the mountain's geology. The main lithological unit characterizing Monte Zovetto is the Main Dolomite, a resistant carbonate rock that forms a solid base for the mountain. The Main Dolomite is a fundamental geological feature of the Asiago Plateau, as it is the parent rock of many of the mountain structures in the region.

=== Jurassic Period (about 200–145 million years ago) ===
During the Early Jurassic, the region underwent a phase of geological change, during which the dolomite sediments were covered by layers of gray limestone. This limestone, mainly consisting of fine-grained micritic limestone, less resistant to erosion compared to the dolomites, contribute to the composition of Monte Zovetto. The presence of Jurassic limestone is particularly evident on the exposed slopes, where it forms visible stratification and contributes to the creation of more eroded and jagged landscapes. During the Jurassic period, erosive activity and the solubility of the limestone began to favor the formation of karst phenomena, such as sinkholes, swallow holes, and underground cavities, now among the predominant geological features of the area.

=== Alpine Orogeny (about 35–25 million years ago) ===
The morphological evolution of Monte Zovetto underwent a significant transformation from the Late Cretaceous to the Tertiary, during the process of Alpine orogeny. This event was triggered by the collision between the African plate and the Eurasian plate, causing the uplift, folding, and fracturing of the pre-existing sedimentary formations. The uplift of the pre-existing dolomites and limestone led to the creation of the mountain ranges that now form the Asiago Plateau. The tectonic movement also generated a series of faults and folds, which have shaped the geological structure of Monte Zovetto.

=== Pleistocene and Holocene (about 3 million years ago) ===
During the Pleistocene and Holocene, the region experienced further landscape modification, primarily due to glaciations. Although the area of Monte Zovetto was not directly covered by glaciers, the colder climate favored glacial erosion and the ablation of debris, contributing to the reorganization of the landscape. The karst phenomenon, intensified by abundant precipitation and surface waters, continued to shape the land, creating sinkholes and caves. These are a distinctive element of Monte Zovetto's landscape, reflecting the continuous interaction between the local geology and chemical erosion processes. The underground karst cavities also provide a habitat for various animal species.

The Monte Zovetto stromatolite horizon, referred to as the 'Zovetto Horizon', is a prominent geological feature characterized by a continuous layer of stromatolites. This horizon is believed to have formed in a shallow, warm marine or lacustrine setting, where conditions supported the growth of microbial mats. These mats played a role in the stabilization of sediments and the development of the layered stromatolitic structures.

== Climate ==
At the elevation of Monte Zovetto, the climate exhibits a mountainous temperate regime, with cool summers and cold winters. Summer temperatures are mild, typically ranging from 15°C to 25°C (59°F to 77°F). Winter has temperatures often dropping below 0°C (32°F) and typically averaging between −5°C (23°F) and −10°C (14°F), especially at night or during periods of intense cold. The plateau generally experiences an annual precipitation ranging from 1400 mm (55 in) to 2000 mm (78 in), with rainfall occurring fairly evenly throughout the year.

Strong southern winds have caused significant environmental damage in the Asiago Plateau, including Monte Zovetto. These air currents have flattened extensive coniferous forests, altering the landscape.

=== Air quality ===
On Monte Zovetto, pollution sources are fewer compared to the plains below, resulting in good air quality. Local air pollution in general is attributed to activities such as fossil fuel production and use, industrial manufacturing, mineral extraction, waste incineration and agricultural practices.

== History ==
=== Etymology ===
According to Mario Rigoni Stern the mountains of the Asiago Plateau are named after Norse mythology. The etymology of the name Zovetto may also have local or dialectal origins.

=== Ancient history ===
Human presence in the area of Monte Zovetto dates back to prehistoric times in the Middle Paleolithic, when Neanderthals (50,000–40,000 years ago) inhabited the Roana region. Between 15,000 and 10,000 years ago this area became a site of human settlement. In the 14th–13th centuries BC, during the Bronze Age, a fortified village was established on Mount Cornion in the municipality of Lusiana. The first evidence of permanent settlements close to Monte Zovetto, dates to the late Iron Age (between the end of the 5th and the early 1st century BC) at Castelletto di Rotzo. Here, a village of Rhaetian origin was destroyed by the Romans in the 2nd–1st century BC, as indicated by the discovery of burned remains and the Roman strategy of controlling the area.

==== Roman period ====
In the 2nd–3rd centuries AD, the Romans built fortifications to monitor the movements of populations coming from the north. Roman sites have been found in the Lusiana and Rotzo areas. Under the Romans, the area of the Asiago Plateau and the Monte Zovetto region was organized as public grazing lands. The evidence of transhumance and the lack of permanent settlements in the region suggest that the Romans utilized the land for collective purposes, including summer grazing and forest exploitation.

=== Middle Ages ===
In the early medieval period, following the fall of the Western Roman Empire in 476 AD, Germanic traditions revived collective land management practices that resembled the "Gemeinden" structure prevalent in Germanic regions. This system was then maintained by the Ostrogoths and it was further strengthened by the Lombards in 569 AD. These collective traditions persisted when the Franks gained control of the area. In the 9th century, the population of the area began to increase, as German-speaking communities established settlements on Monte Zovetto and the surrounding mountains. It was during this time that the Cimbrian language, a Germanic language still in use today in Roana, emerged on the mountain. Historically, this language was widely spoken across the mountainous area between the Adige and Brenta rivers.

The history of Monte Zovetto and its surrounding area was shaped by feudalism and ecclesiastical power. In 915, the bishop of Padua was granted dominion over the Brenta valley, restoring Padua's control over the plateau. This was reinforced by Otto I, Holy Roman Emperor, in the 10th century. In the 11th century the Da Romano family (known as the Ezzelini), an important feudal family established in this area, formed strong ties with the Diocese of Freising in Bavaria. By the 12th century, the Da Romano family had established control over strategic areas like Castello di Godego and the frazione of Onara, important for regulating trade routes. In 1310, Monte Zovetto became part of the Spettabile Reggenza dei Sette Comuni ("Esteemed Regency of the Seven Municipalities"), an autonomous federal government established to safeguard the independence of the communities on the Asiago Plateau. During this period, Venice expanded inland, acquiring territories such as Vicenza, Bassano del Grappa, and the Altopiano. The 1378–1381 War of Chioggia marked a turning point for Venice, and in 1405, the towns of the Plateau, including the Monte Zovetto area, formally pledged allegiance to Venice, becoming part of the Republic, though with special privileges. In exchange for autonomy, commercial and tax privileges, the people of the plateau promised Venice timber supplies and defence of the northern borders, particularly against the Habsburg imperial troops.

=== Modern times and the Napoleonic period ===
Due to its location, the Plateau and Monte Zovetto became the site of several conflicts during the 16th century. The militias of the Spettabile Reggenza were repeatedly forced to confront the invading armies of Sigismund of Austria (in 1487). From 1508 to 1516 the War of the League of Cambrai, a conflict between the Republic of Venice and a coalition of European powers, including the Papal States, France, Spain, and the Holy Roman Empire, directly affected the Plateau. The Republic of Venice aimed to maintain control of the region and secure its borders, but the ongoing European wars influenced this area.

After the fall of the Republic of Venice in 1797, Monte Zovetto region fell under French domination as part of Napoleon's territorial reorganization of Italy. This marked the fall of Venetian rule in the region. The Reggenza dei Sette Comuni ceased to exist in 1807, marking the end of its longstanding autonomy, with Angelo Rigoni Stern serving as its final chancellor. The area was absorbed into the Napoleonic domain but after Napoleon's defeat at Waterloo, the Congress of Vienna in 1815 transferred control of the region to Austria, where it became part of the Austrian district of Vicenza. Despite initial acceptance of the Austrian rule, the local population grew increasingly discontent, especially during the 1809 Tyrolean Rebellion, which spread to Asiago. The Austrians attempted to secure their authority over the area but the region continued to face severe economic issues, aggravated by agricultural crises and poor living conditions.

=== 19th century and the unification of Italy ===
Monte Zovetto became part of the Kingdom of Italy after the 1866 annexation of Veneto. Despite being integrated into the new nation, the region continued to struggle with economic challenges, marked by a large number of people migrating to Germany, Austria, and Switzerland.

=== World War I ===
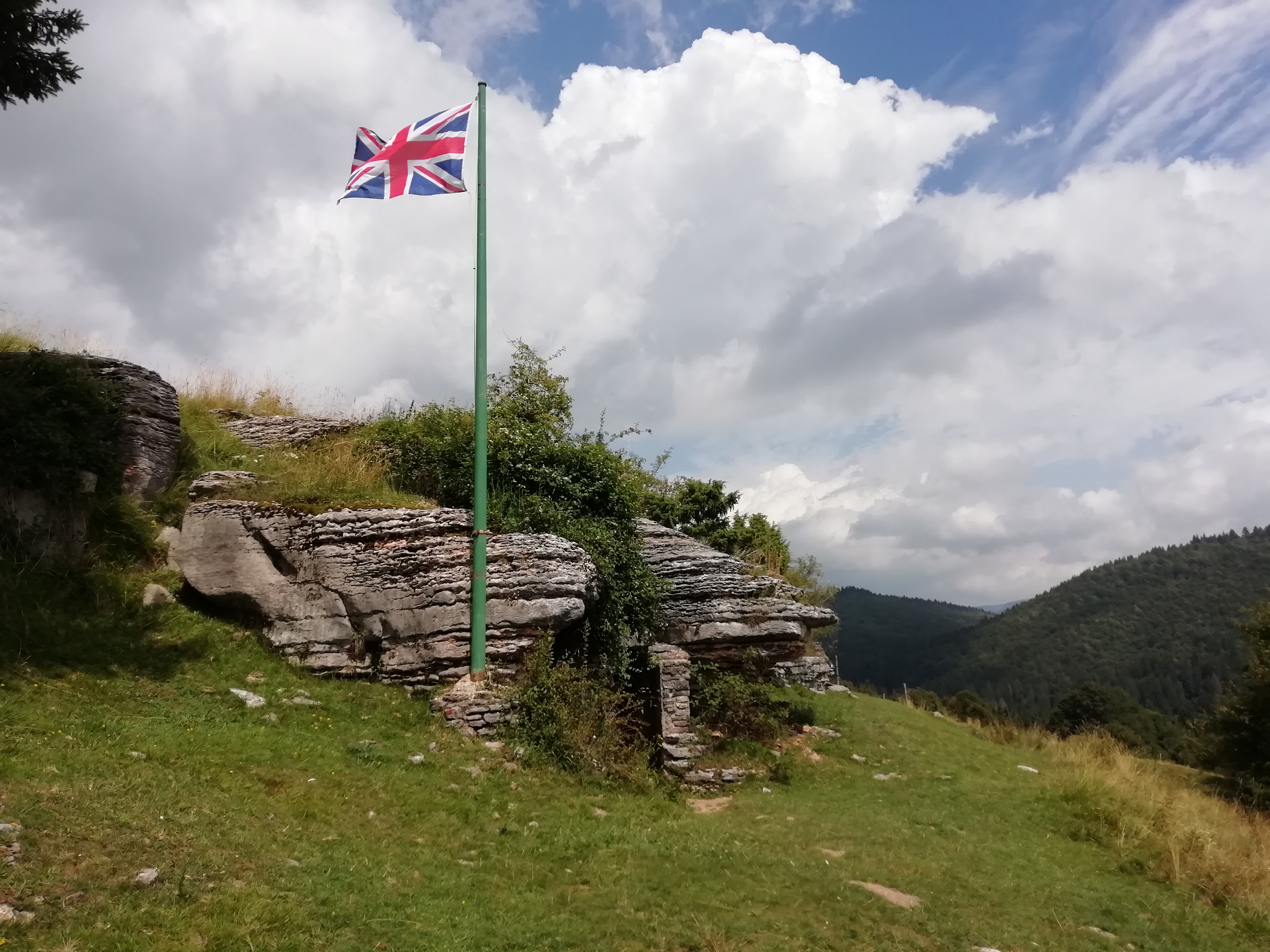
British fortifications of the First World War, in Cesuna di Roana. Part of the Great War Ecomuseum in the Vicenza Pre-Alps.

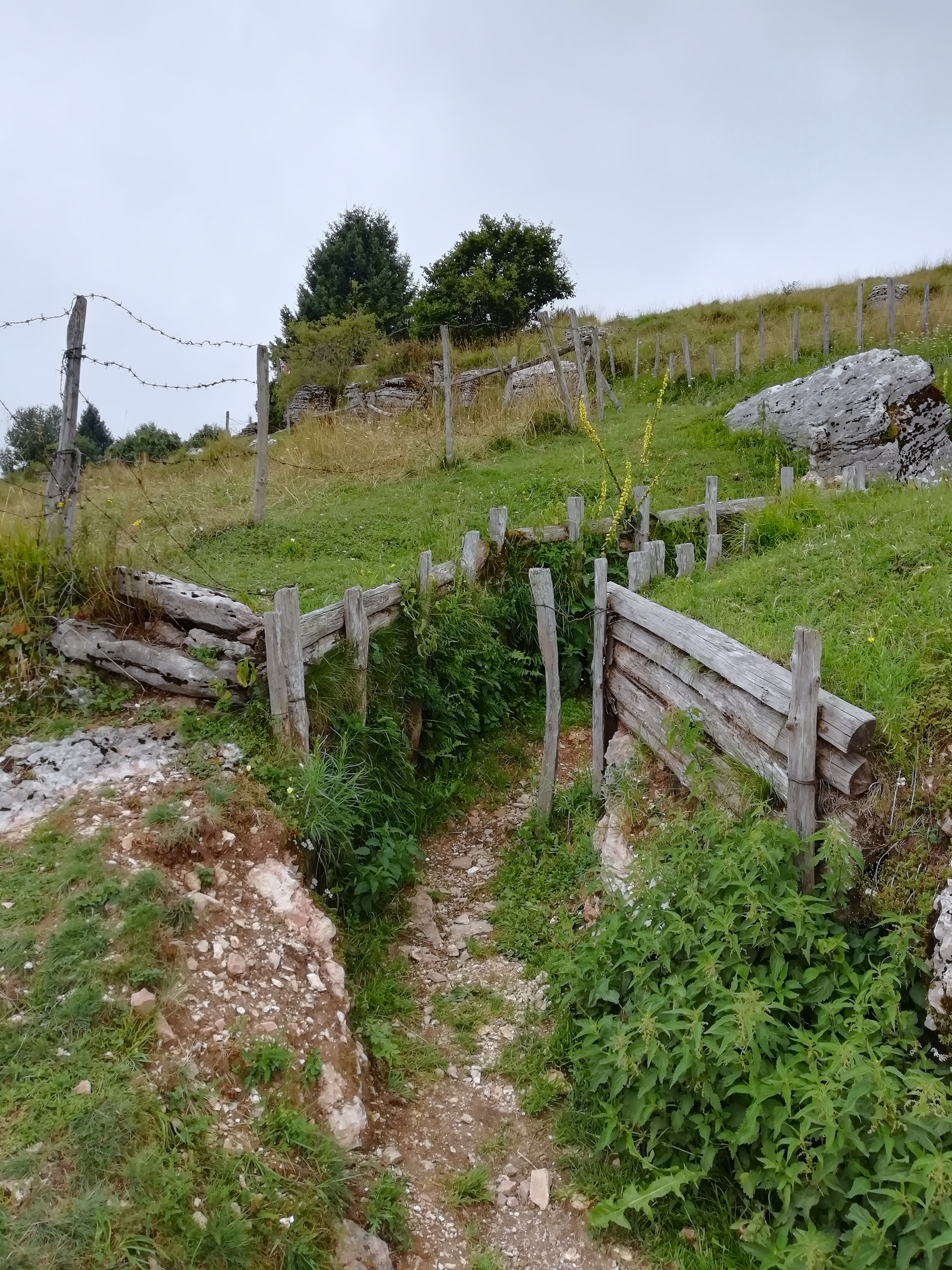
British trenches from WWI on Monte Zovetto

In early June 1916 Monte Zovetto was part of an Italian defensive line preventing the advancing Austrian Strafexpedition from gaining access to Val Canaglia. The Italian army was in retreat after a strong defense against an Austrian counterattack on 11 April 1916, where the battalions of the 157th Regiment and machine gunners, led by Giuseppe Rusca, fought back fiercely. By 5 and 6 June the Liguria, Forli, Pescara and Catanzaro brigades, had retreated to defensive positions from Lemerle to Monte Zovetto, Val Magnaboschi and Mount Pau in the southern part of the Asiago Plateau. The 33rd Division, along with the Liguria brigade, had arrived in the Vicenza region as a reserve force in early June.

From 14 to 16 June, the Austro-Hungarian 1st Army Corps launched the final attack of the Strafexpedition in this area. The Italian forces held its position for two days before the offensive was finally repelled, with the Liguria brigade suffering 25% casualties. On Monte Zovetto, the brigade Lieutenant Giuseppe Rusca was killed while directing machine gunners from behind the trenches, exposed to enemy fire. In recognition of his courage, Rusca was awarded the Gold Medal for Military Valor.

In April 1917 the first artillery units from the United Kingdom reached Italy to support attacks in the Carso area. It was only after the defeat at Caporetto on 24 October 1917 and the retreat of the Italian army to the Altopiano–Grappa–Piave line, that the Allies provided substantial support to Italy (a British Expeditionary Force as well as six French divisions were sent to Italy), trying to stop the Austro-Hungarians from advancing into the Po Valley and possibly towards the southern French border. The Allies were also concerned that a further Italian defeat could severely affect morale and have a negative impact on the war effort. If the Austrians had entered Italy, they could have attacked France from the Alps, where no troops had been stationed for some time due to Italy's initial neutrality and later its coalition with the Allies. This is why the Allies acted quickly to send troops, and wanted to position them along the Mincio River, which was considered a strong natural defense line, to help keep Austria away from the French border.

In late March 1918, the British XIV Corps, which consisted of the 7th, 23rd, and 48th Divisions, were deployed to this area, under the command of Lord Cavan. In June 1918, the Austro-Hungarian forces launched a major offensive, with Hungarian soldiers from the 38th "Honved" Division attacking the Allied positions, while the 23rd and 48th Divisions were at the forefront of the defense. Despite some local setbacks, particularly in the Cesuna sector where the 48th Division faced difficulties in holding its position, the Allies managed to resist the assault. Italian artillery, positioned near the strategic Cengio Ridge, provided support, while a decisive British counterattack helped to repel the Austrian forces. The battle, known as the Second Battle of the Piave River or Battle of the Solstice, was a turning point in halting the Austro-Hungarian offensive. The coordinated defense by the Italian and British forces successfully stopped the enemy's progress and secured the front line. After the Austro-Hungarian defeat in the Battle of the Piave River, the Italian army launched a major counter-offensive known as the Battle of Vittorio Veneto fought from 24 October to 3 November 1918. The Italian victory not only marked the conclusion of the war on the Italian Front but also resulted in the collapse of the Austro-Hungarian Empire. By that time, the area had been fortified, and these well-preserved defences remain visible on Monte Zovetto to this day. Also, WWI finds from the area are today preserved in the Canove district History museum in Roana, which has over 8,500 artifacts, including an extensive array of weapons and military equipment as well as photographs captured during WWI.

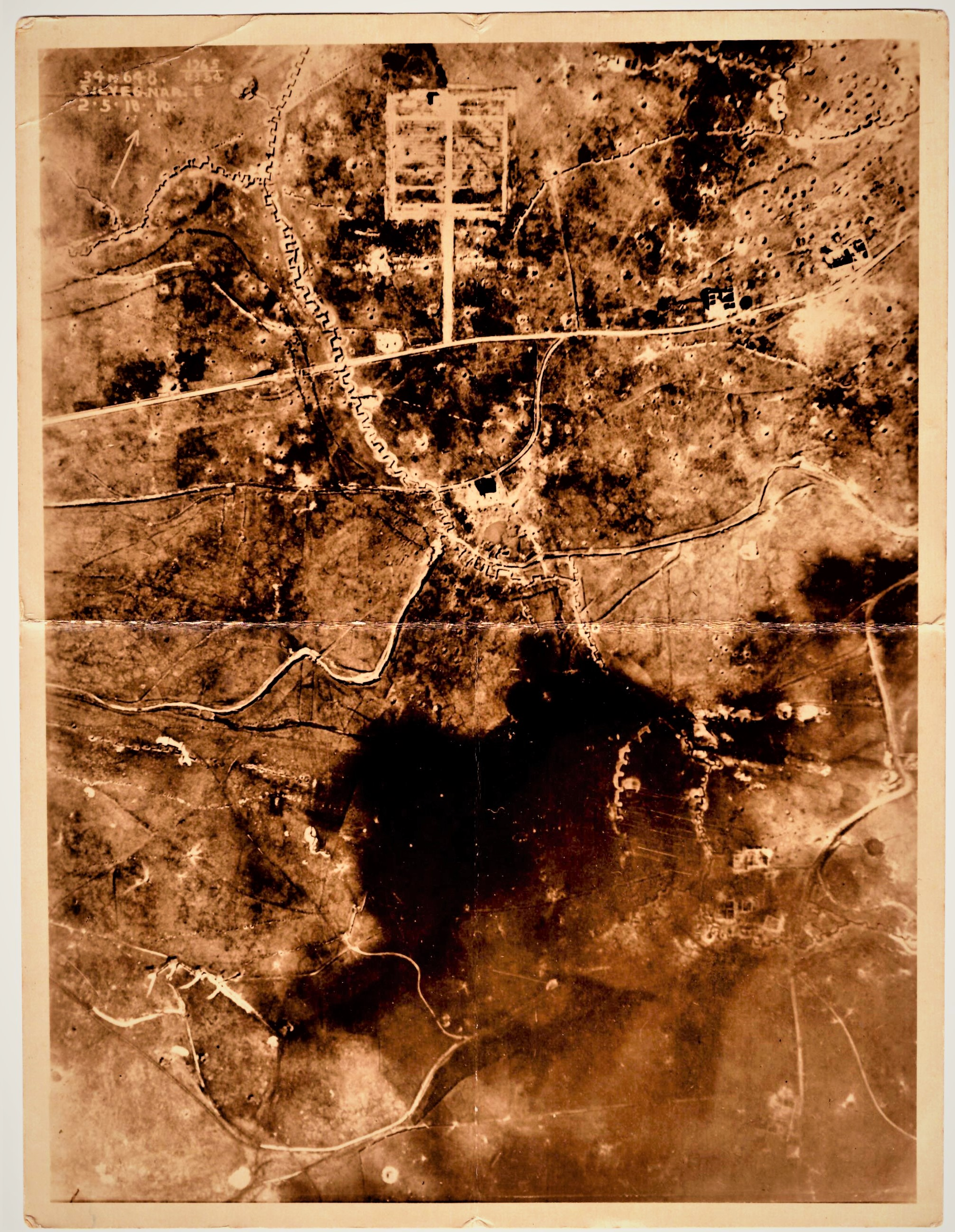
Aerial photo taken by the British over the Austro-Hungarian positions near Asiago. This image shows the frontline positions of 1918 from the Zovetto and Lemerle mountains to the Tre Monti.

==== Trenches ====
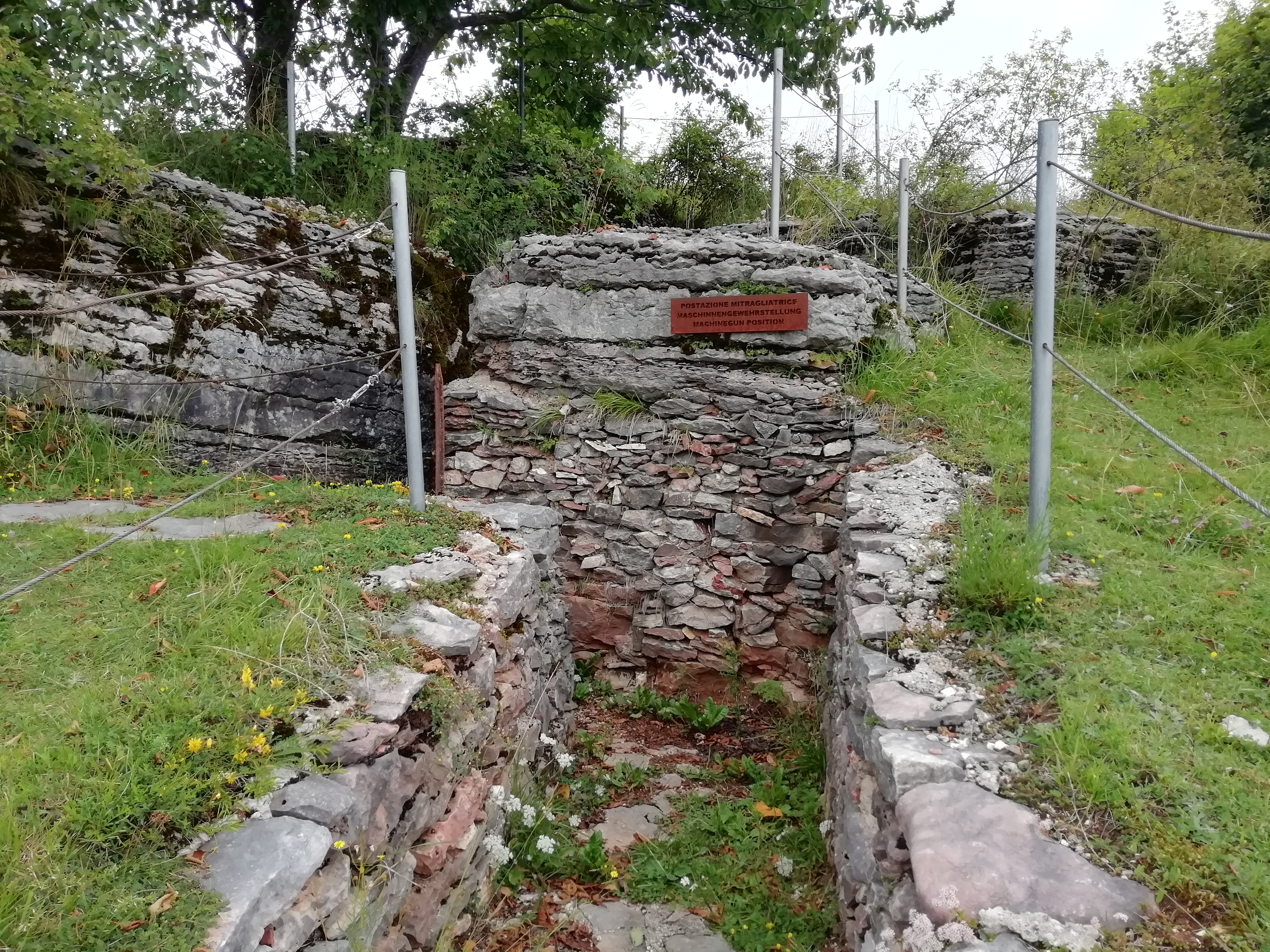
British trenches used during WWI on Monte Zovetto

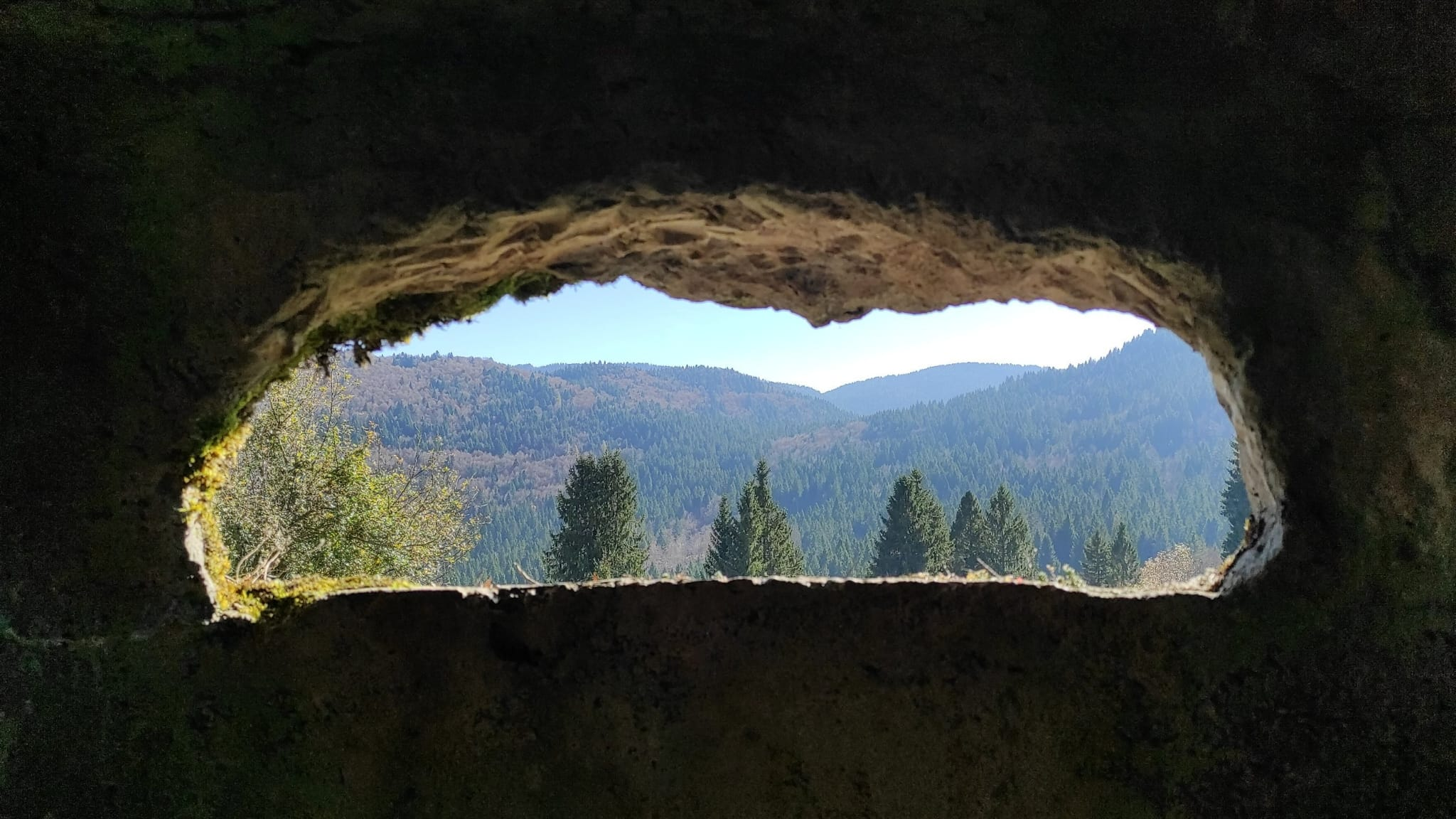
View from an opening in an English trench on Monte Zovetto

The trenches on Monte Zovetto were built in order to provide coverage for the troops, as firearms had become more precise and powerful. They offered soldiers greater protection while using their weapons, allowed for better observation of the enemy, and served as an obstacle to any attackers. The trenches were often surrounded by obstacles such as barbed wire and the so-called cheval de frise, in case the enemy attempted to attack. The trenches were about two meters deep, with the side facing the enemy usually having a step for lookouts to monitor enemy movements. Building trenches in the mountainous terrain was challenging, so soldiers had to adapt to the natural landscape, utilizing it to their advantage. They weren't built in a straight line, but with a zig-zag pattern to reduce damage from artillery and to make it more difficult for the enemy to observe. This design also allowed for the possibility of crossfire. The front-line trenches, sometimes only fifty meters from the Austrian trenches, were built on difficult, sloping terrain, creating "dead zones" that prevented direct artillery fire but allowed the enemy to launch large rocks. The trenches had small openings through which the soldiers could observe or shoot while still being protected. On Monte Zovetto, there were machine gun positions where soldiers used to place their guns and shoot through small openings in the rock without exposing themselves.

=== World War II ===
During the early years of fascism, many citizens who opposed the regime were forced to emigrate. However, between 1943 and 1945, Monte Zovetto became a focal point of partisan resistance against the German occupation and the Italian Social Republic. The partisan groups established hideouts and set up logistical bases to support their operations. The resistance was particularly effective in the mountains because of the advantage provided by the terrain.

=== After World War II ===
The area experienced a decline in living conditions after the collapse of fascism, leading to a significant wave of emigration. The 1960s marked a turning point as the economy began to recover, driven by the growth of tourism: villas and apartments were built on Monte Zovetto and commercial activities expanded.

Until 2014 Monte Zovetto was the site of the Cesuna Ski Resort, at an altitude of 1,087 m to 1,232 m, with a vertical drop of 145 meters. The ski area had two ski lifts: Monte Zovetto 1, and Baby Oliver, which had a combined capacity of transporting up to 1606 people per hour, with a total length of 1.2 km. The resort closed in 2014 due to financial difficulties and low visitor numbers. The main slope Zovetto 1 was 2.6 kilometers long, and it was classified as easy.

In 2014 the Sette Comuni organized into the Comunità Montana dell'Altopiano dei Sette Comuni ("Mountain Community of the Plateau of the Seven Municipalities") to serve as the administrative body for the Asiago Plateau. It promotes cooperation among its members, carrying out the mission of the historic federation. The community includes the municipalities of Asiago, Enego, Foza, Gallio, Roana, Rotzo and Lusiana Conco. As of November 2024 the current President of the Council is Paolo Finco, while Bruno Oro is the President of the Executive Committee.

Today, based on ancient Germanic rules and the autonomy claimed by the Sette Comuni, part of the mountain's area remains collective property, neither privately owned nor state-owned. This land is referred to as "property for common use" because it has been passed down the right to enjoy its resources (the so-called frutti in the Italian Legal System), without individual ownership rights. As Mario Rigoni Stern wrote, "In the territory of the Sette Comuni, there are no castles of nobility, no mansions of lords, nor cathedrals of bishops, simply because the land belongs to the people and its fruits are shared by all, as was the custom in ancient times".

== Monuments ==
=== War cemeteries ===
The area of Monte Zovetto has two cemeteries in Val Magnaboschi, both commemorating soldiers who died during World War I.

==== Italian–Austrian cemetery ====
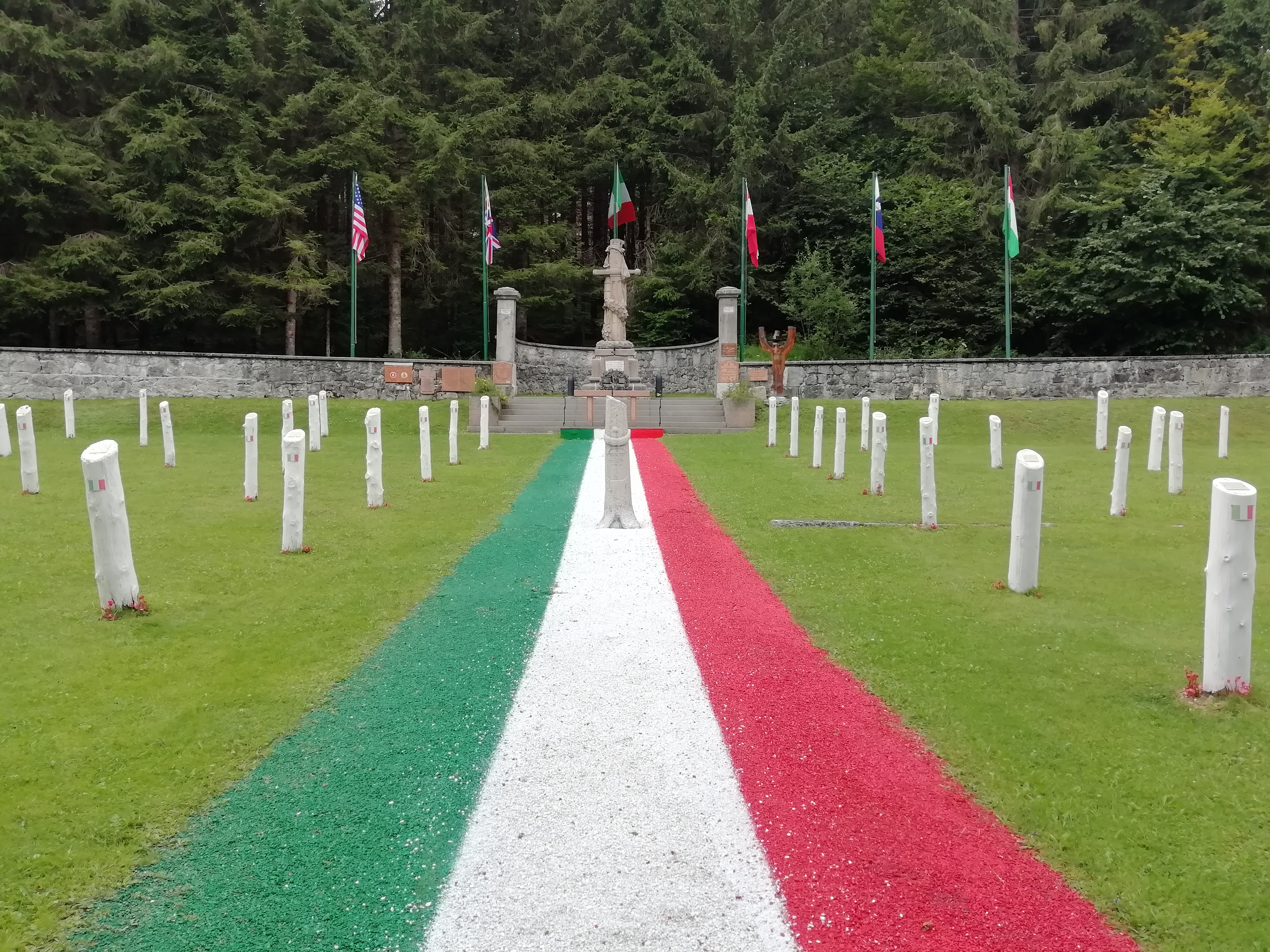
Italian-Austrian cemetery of Val Magnaboschi

The Italian-Austrian cemetery of Val Magnaboschi contains the remains of 50 unknown soldiers, buried beneath tree trunks. The bodies of the identified soldiers were moved long ago from this site, and are now at the Asiago War Memorial with other victims from the war. Although most of the bodies are no longer there, this cemetery remains a historical site, honoring the memory of the victims of the Great War. Many of the victims buried in this cemetery died during the Strafexpedition on the mountains nearby, mostly on Monte Zovetto, Mount Lemerle and Val Magnaboschi. Restoration of this cemetery was started by volunteers in 1993 and completed in 2006. It hosts an annual "International infantryman pilgrimage" organised by the Associazione Nazionale del Fante.

==== British cemetery ====
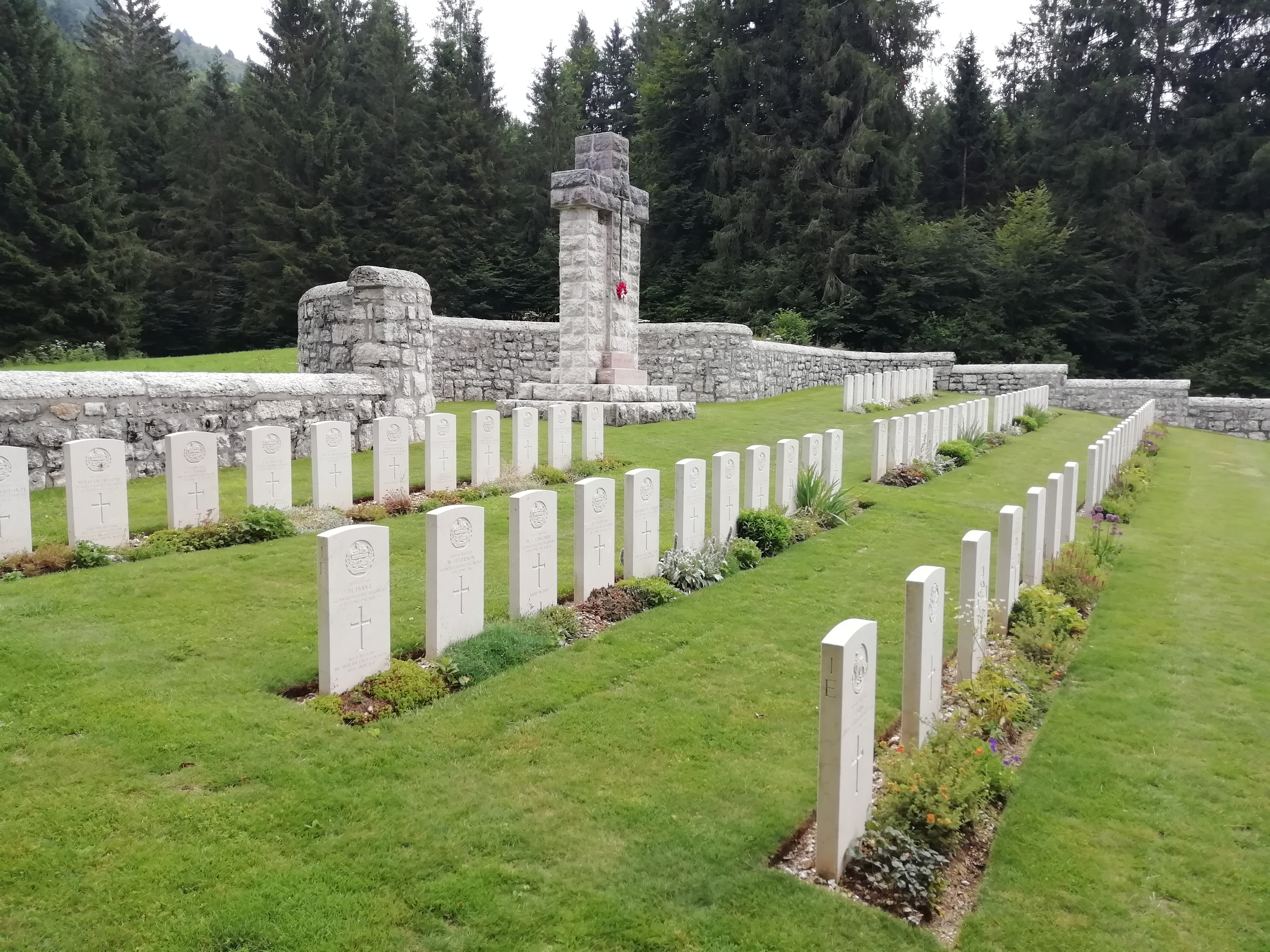
Magnaboschi British cemetery

The Magnaboschi British cemetery is one of five British cemeteries in the Asiago Plateau area, with others at Val Magnaboschi, Barenthal, Boscon, Cavalletto, and Granezza. These five cemeteries, in which are buried a total of 1,024 soldiers, are all protected by the Commonwealth War Graves Commission which ensures conservation and also holds a database with various information such as name, service number, date of death, age, regiment, and in some cases, the names of the relatives of the deceased. In this cemetery, 183 soldiers of the British Empire are buried. The land for the cemetery was donated by Italy to Great Britain, and they are therefore extraterritorial areas. In the cemetery there are tombstones in white stone, with inscriptions on each regarding the soldier and the date of death; on 119 of them the date is 15 June 1918, since most of them died while trying to defend this area against the Austro-Hungarian offensive. At the end of the avenue lined with headstones stands a large stone cross, beneath which is inscribed the epitaph Their name liveth for evermore, chosen from lines by Rudyard Kipling.

=== Brigata Liguria monument ===
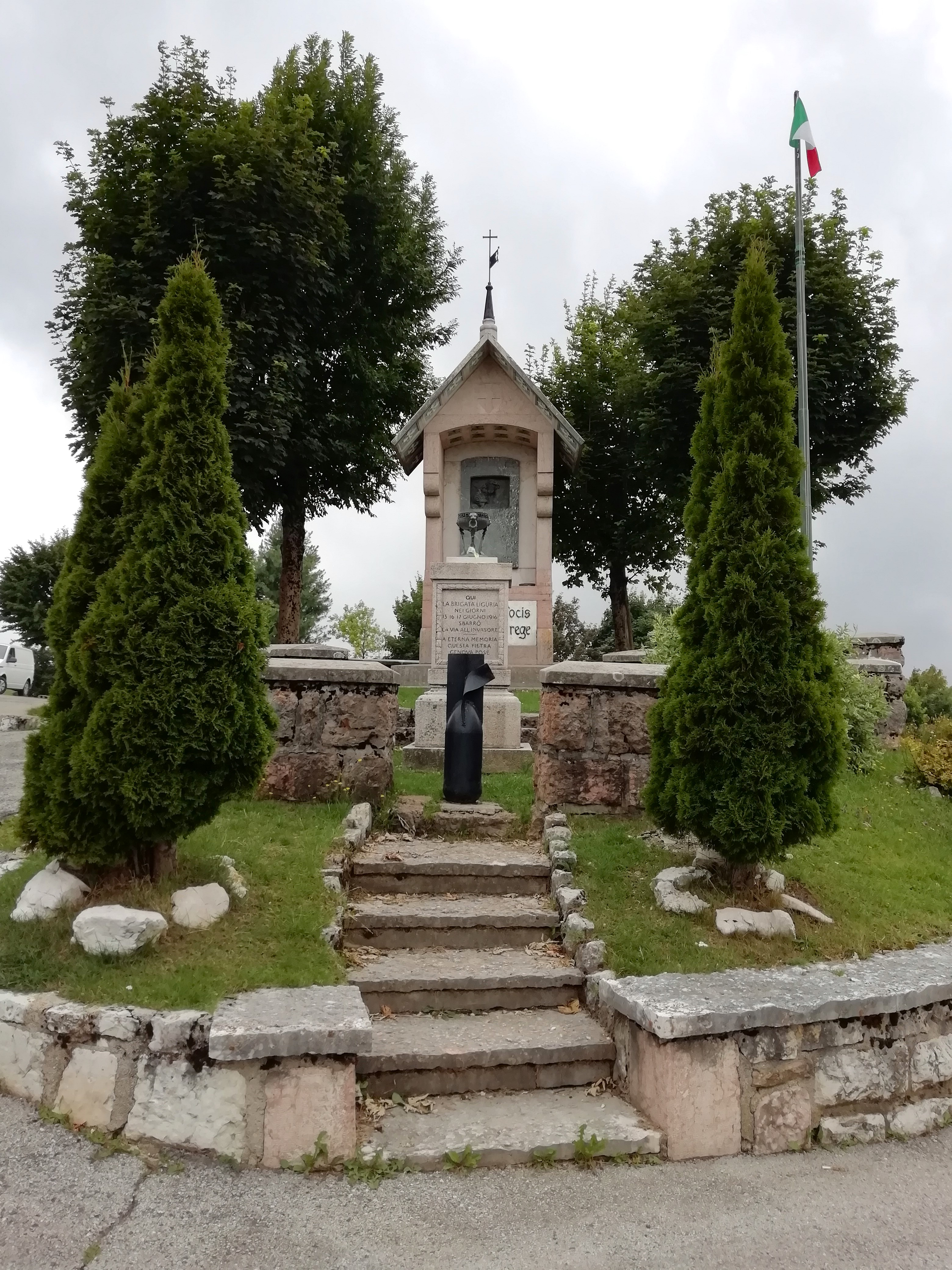
Monument on Monte Zovetto dedicated to the Liguria brigade

The Brigata Liguria monument on Monte Zovetto commemorates the actions of the Liguria brigade, the only regiment of the Italian Army to receive two Gold Medals for Military Valor. The first gold medal was awarded for events in 1916 during the Strafexpedition, when the brigade held out against Austrian attacks on the Asiago Plateau, along the line between Monte Zovetto and Mount Lemerle, near Cesuna, in the municipality of Roana. The brigade suffered over 3,000 casualties, later reinterred at the Asiago War Memorial at Leiten after the war. On 29 June 2008, a historical reenactment was held on Monte Zovetto by the Association Per Non Dimenticare (To Not Forget) of Padua to honor this brigade and commemorate their services. The Brigata Liguria also distinguished itself on Mount Pasubio. After more than a year in the Venetian Pre-alps, under the command of future General Achille Papa, the brigade was transferred in 1917 to Bainsizza, where they received another gold medal for military valor.

=== Cippo Bignami ===
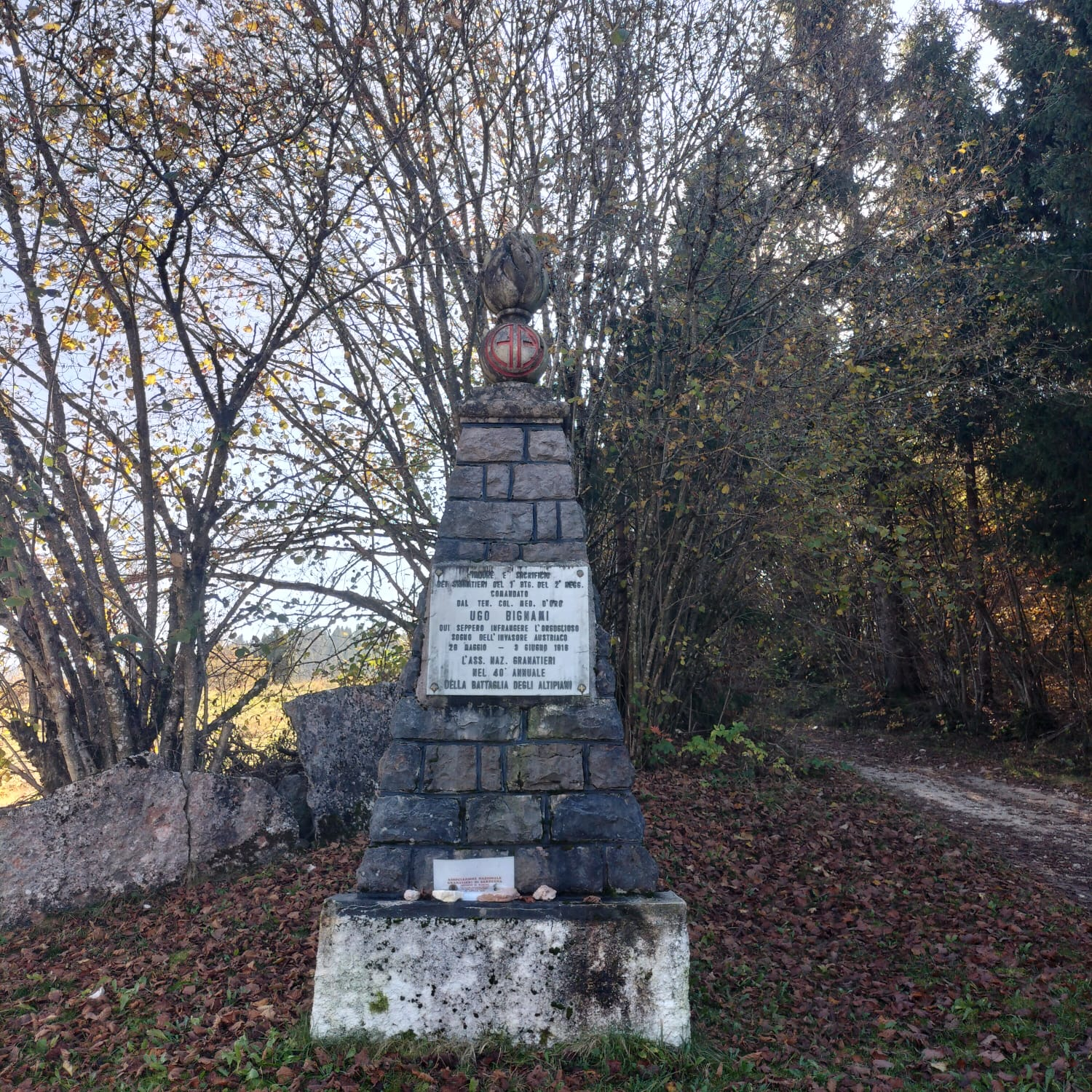
Cippo Bignami, at the bottom of Monte Zovetto

The Cippo Bignami is a monument at the base of Monte Zovetto. It was dedicated to Ugo Bignami, commander of the 1st Battalion, 2nd Regiment of the Brigade of the Granatieri di Sardegna, and his men, who defended Peak 1152, a summit near Cesuna. From 31 May to 2 June 1916, despite enemy bombing, Commander Bignami and his troops managed to hold their positions until June 3rd, when the Austro-Hungarian infantry was able to break through the Italian defensive lines and conquered the area up to Mount Busibollo, behind the Grenadiers'. The Italians were quickly surrounded. Colonel Bignami took action and shot four Austrian soldiers before being captured. This monument was erected to honor the Italian soldiers that fought to defend this area, and in particular the three decorated soldiers: Second lieutenant Teodoro Capocci, Lieutenant Colonel Ugo Bignami, and Grenadier Alfonso Samoggia (all part of the II° Regiment and I° Battalion of the Grenadiers). The plaque on the monument commemorates the events from 28 May to 3 June 1916, for which Ugo Bignami was awarded a Gold Medal for Military Valor. The inscription describes how the defenders "crushed the invaders' dream". The monument is crowned with a bomb with a vertical flame, the symbol of the Grenadiers and Rifles Guard Regiment.

=== Engraving of the British troops on Monte Zovetto ===
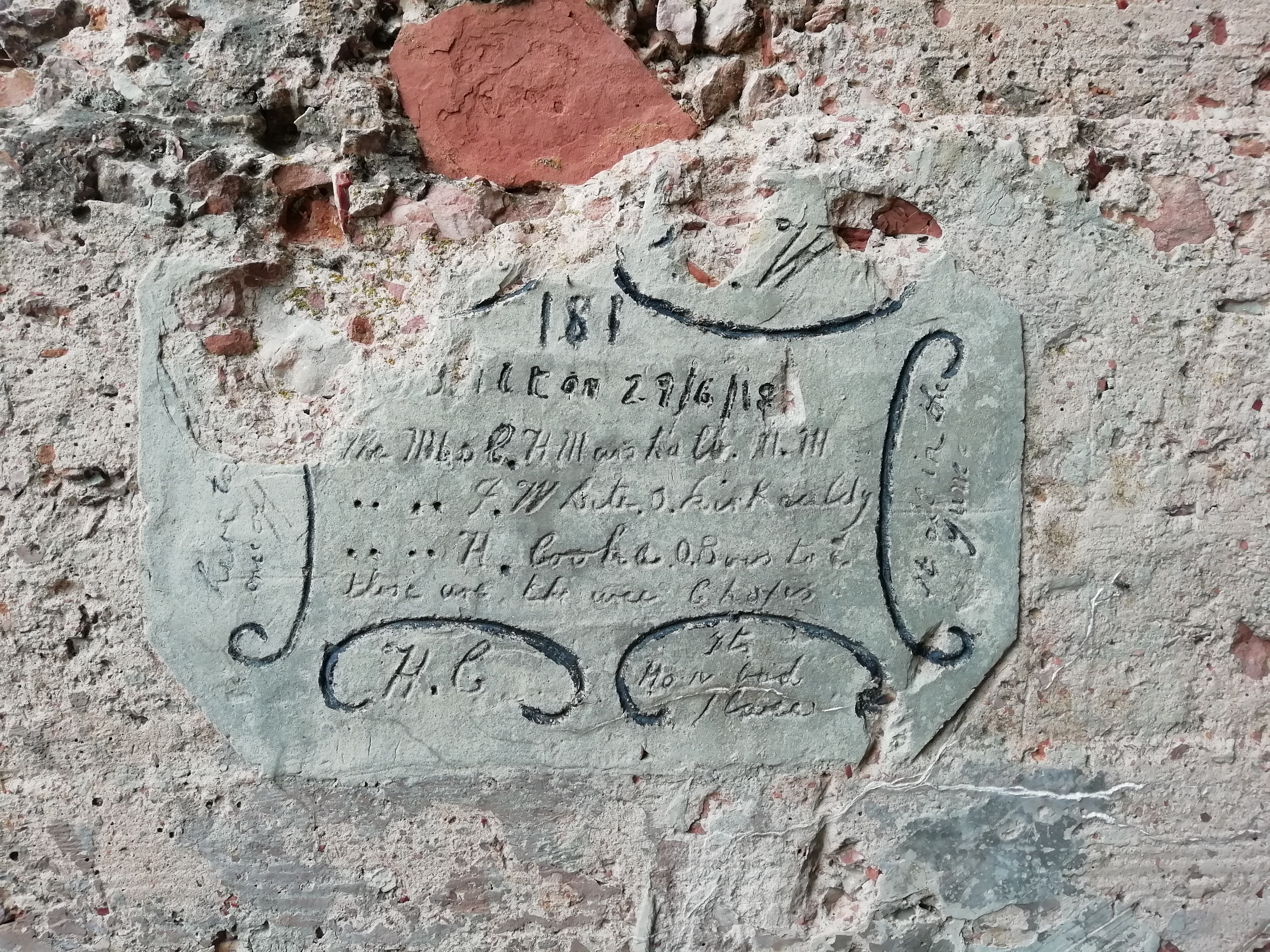
Engraving of the British troops in WWI trenches on Monte Zovetto

The slopes of Monte Zovetto housed British troops' defensive positions from the end of March 1918, especially on the eastern side, where Scottish machine guns were stationed. These defences consisted of two lines of reinforced trenches, connected by narrow subterranean tunnels, with access points via vertical shafts still visible on the hillside. A water storage tank from that period can still be found in the area. This engraving was made by British soldiers in one of the multiple trenches in the area. The text is partially damaged but it records the date it was made (29/6/1918), the initials of the soldiers and a quote that reads: Here today, once off ....

== Flora and fauna ==
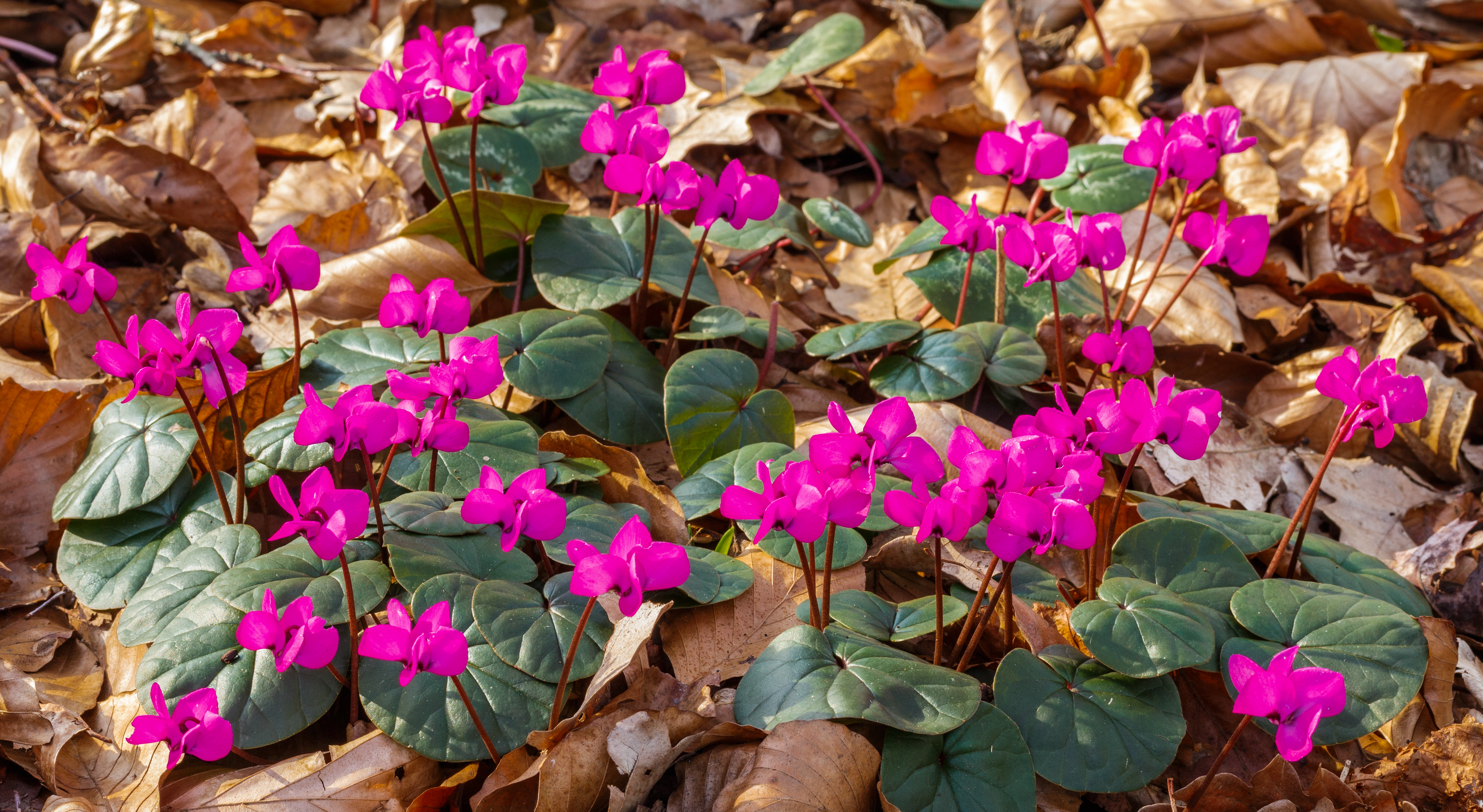
Cyclamen flower on Monte Zovetto

=== Flora ===
The vegetation of Monte Zovetto and its surrounding area follows a typical submontane succession. Shrubland and mixed forests give way to beech forests and fir woods, which are showing signs of abandonment, with shrub expanding as thorny plants take over. The beech, managed through periodic coppicing, is the main species used by the local population for centuries as a source of firewood for heating homes. More robust trees such as hazels, willows, maples, and firs are establishing themselves in the area.

The landscape of Monte Zovetto is characterized by meadows and pastures, interspersed with coniferous forests of silver fir, mountain ash, and hazel trees. In spring, early bloomers like Anemone nemorosa, Ficaria verna, primroses, and Erythronium dens-canis emerge, followed by Galanthus, Scilla bifolia, and later, Dentaria enneaphyllos and Oxalis. In the beech forest, the lower vegetation is dominated by ferns and shade-loving plants such as Paris quadrifolia and Aruncus dioicus. In summer, the more grassy areas of the mountain, used for grazing cows and goats, host a variety of herbaceous species, including wildflowers such as cyclamen, orchids, clovers, cornflowers and gentian. The flora of the area, shaped by local microclimates, is rich in botanical diversity.

=== Fauna ===
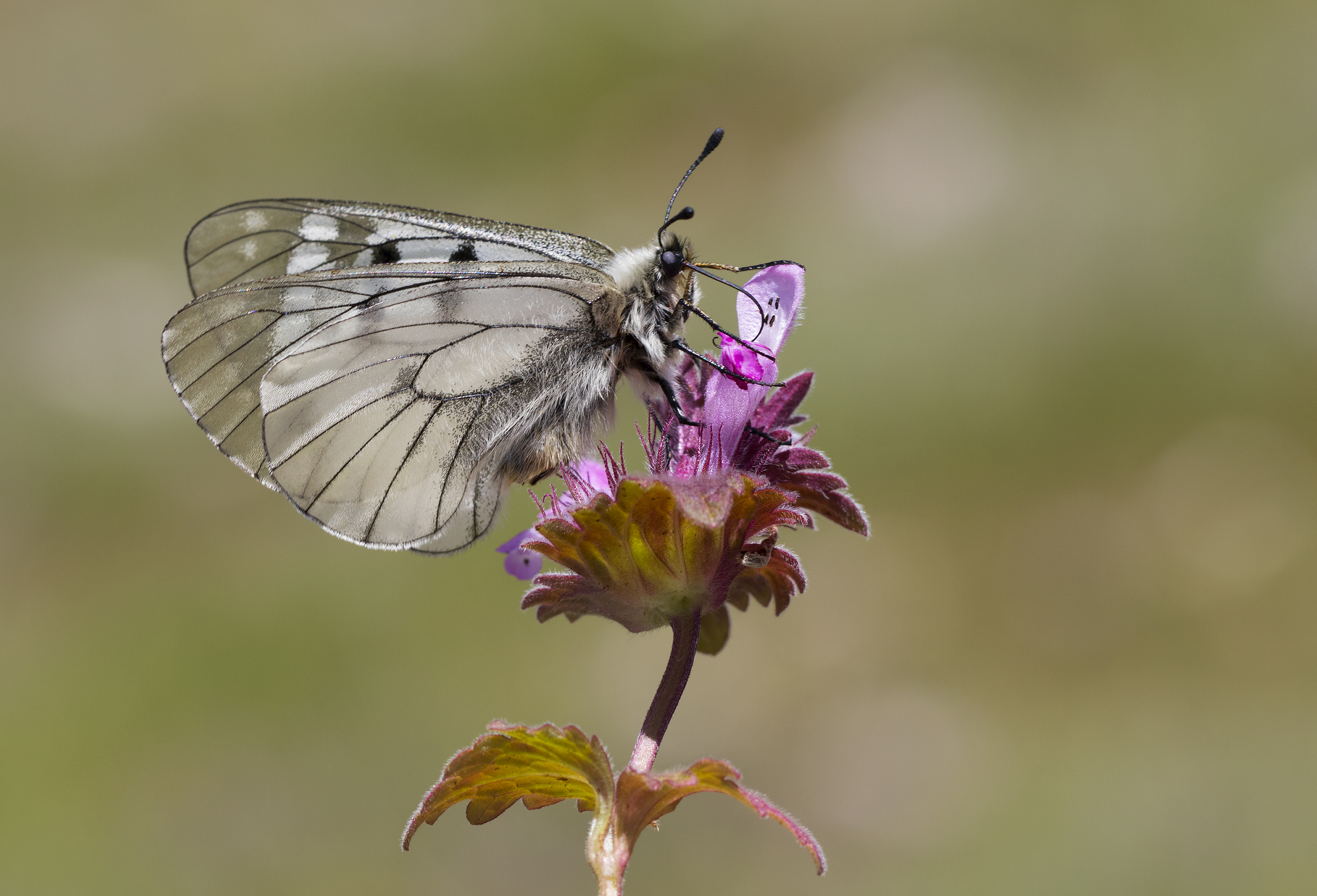
Parnassius, a distinctive butterfly species native to Monte Zovetto

The fauna that populates Monte Zovetto, due to an altitude ranging from 900 m (2952 ft) to 1,200 m (3937 ft), have developed specific survival strategies to cope with the harsh climatic conditions. Some species, such as the white partridge, the mountain hare, and the stoat, change their appearance according to the seasons, adopting a white coat in winter to blend in with the snow. Other animals, like the marmot, the dormouse, and bats, enter hibernation to reduce energy consumption during the long winter months.

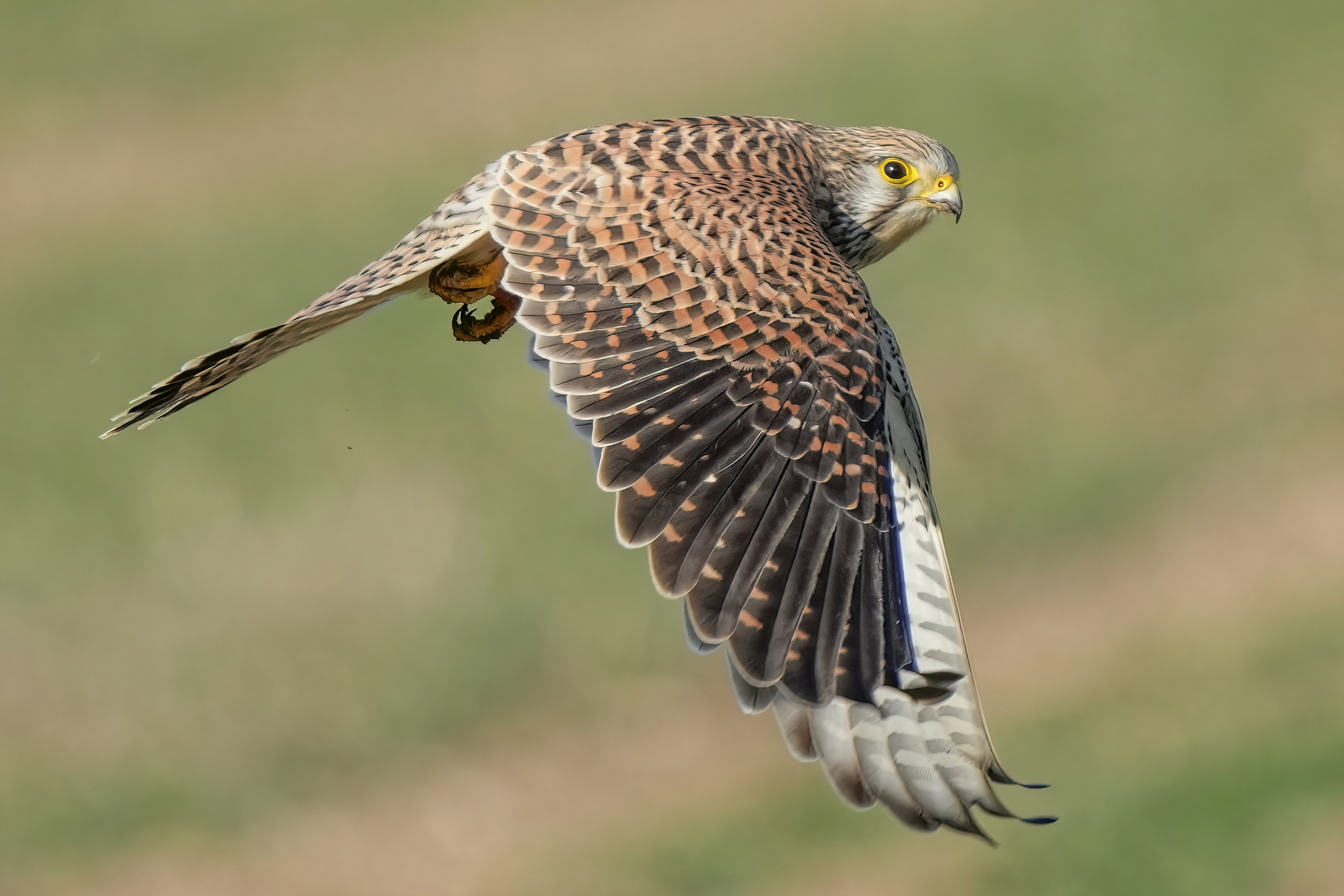
A kestrel, a species found in the Monte Zovetto area

Mountain birds frequent Monte Zovetto primarily during the summer months, when they nest and raise their young. Among these species are the white-collared blackbird, the bluethroat, and the kestrel. The fauna of Monte Zovetto also includes a variety of invertebrates, such as insects, spiders, earthworms, and molluscs, all adapted to life in a mountainous environment. Among them, alpine lepidoptera, such as parnassius and erebia butterflies, inhabit the mountain's high altitudes, adapting to low temperatures and sparse vegetation.

In 1890, the geologist and paleontologist Giovanni Omboni discovered remains of a crocodile, including a skull of Stenosaurus barettoni, on the mountain. This finding is significant as it provides evidence of a warmer, prehistoric climate in the region when reptiles like crocodiles could inhabit the area.

== Tourism ==
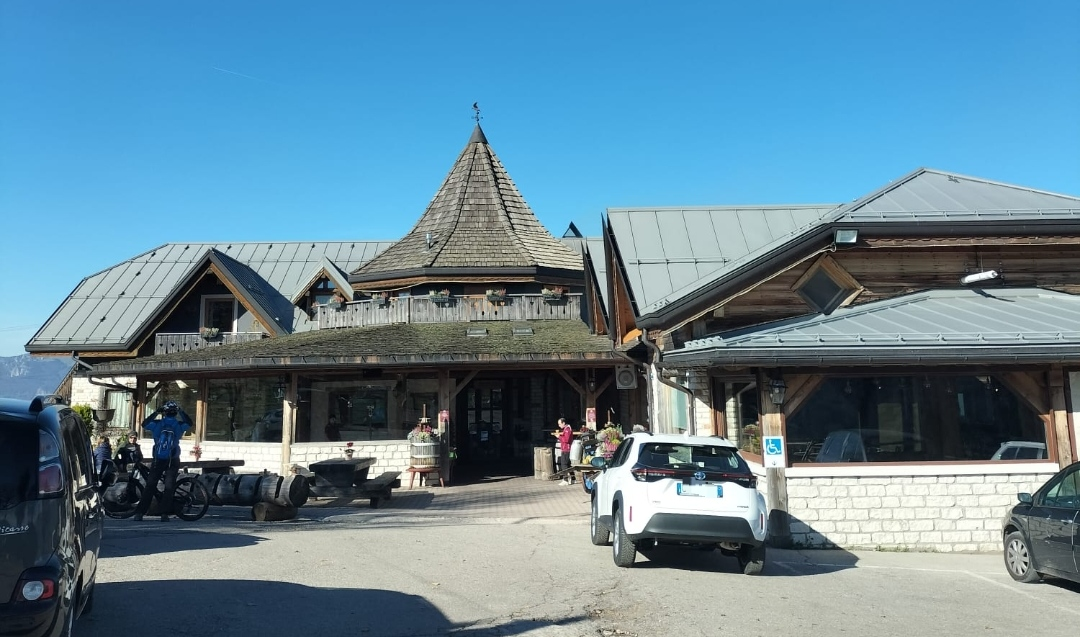
Rifugio Kubelek on top of Monte Zovetto

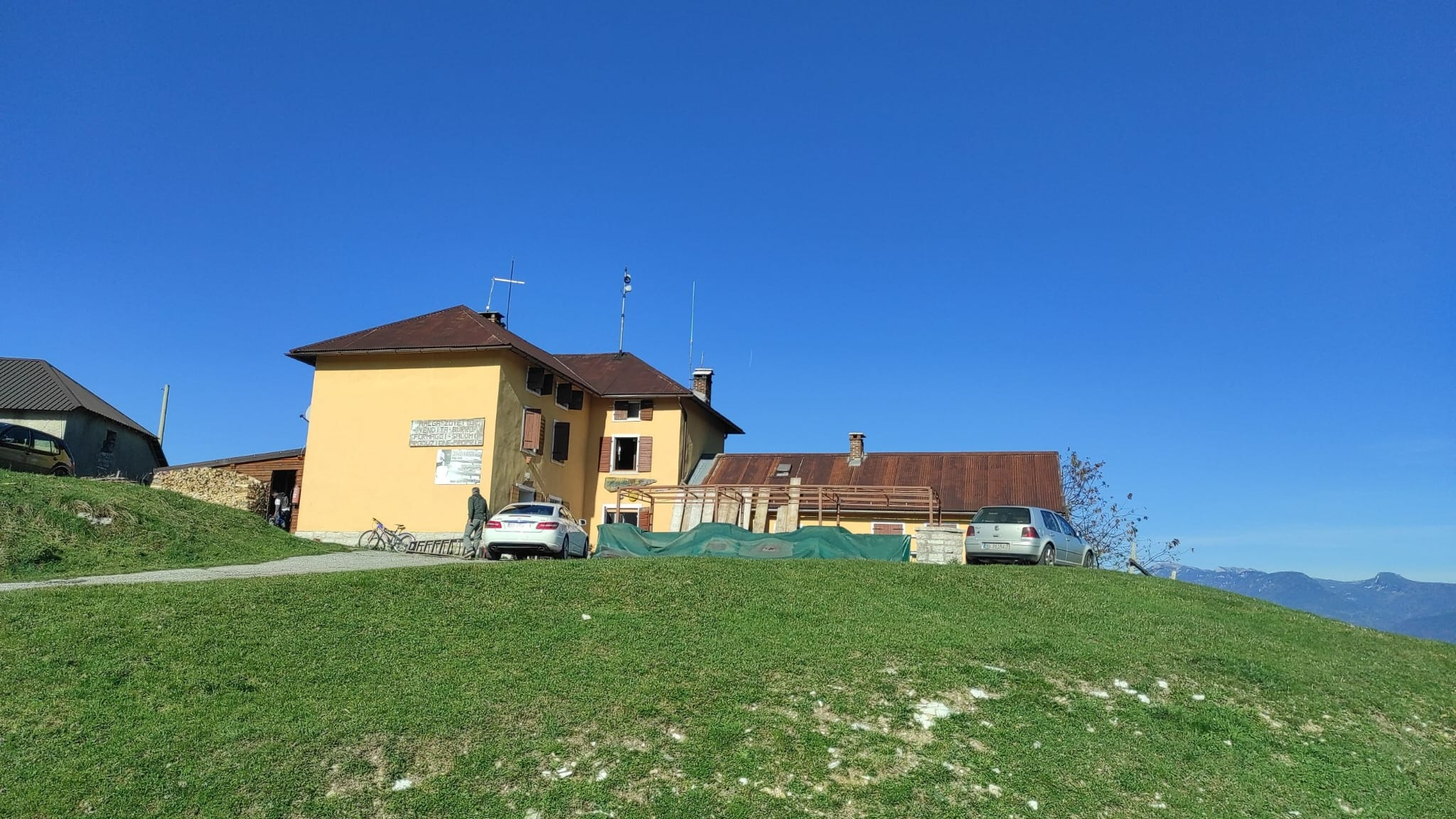
Malga Zovetto on the top of Monte Zovetto

=== Walking Routes ===
==== The Malga Trail initiative ====
The Sette Comuni on the Asiago Plateau created the "Malga Trail" in order to promote the farms on the plateau, including Malga Zovetto, through a trail accessible by bike or by foot. This initiative was created to aid the economy of the malghe and to encourage tourism. These types of farms are characteristic of the region, with a total of 78 spread across the plateau.

==== Magnaboschi Valley – Monte Zovetto Hiking Trail ====
The Magnaboschi valley – Monte Zovetto is a hiking route on the Asiago Plateau. It is accessible to hikers of various skill levels, covers a total distance of approximately 3.6 km and reaches the mountain's maximum elevation.

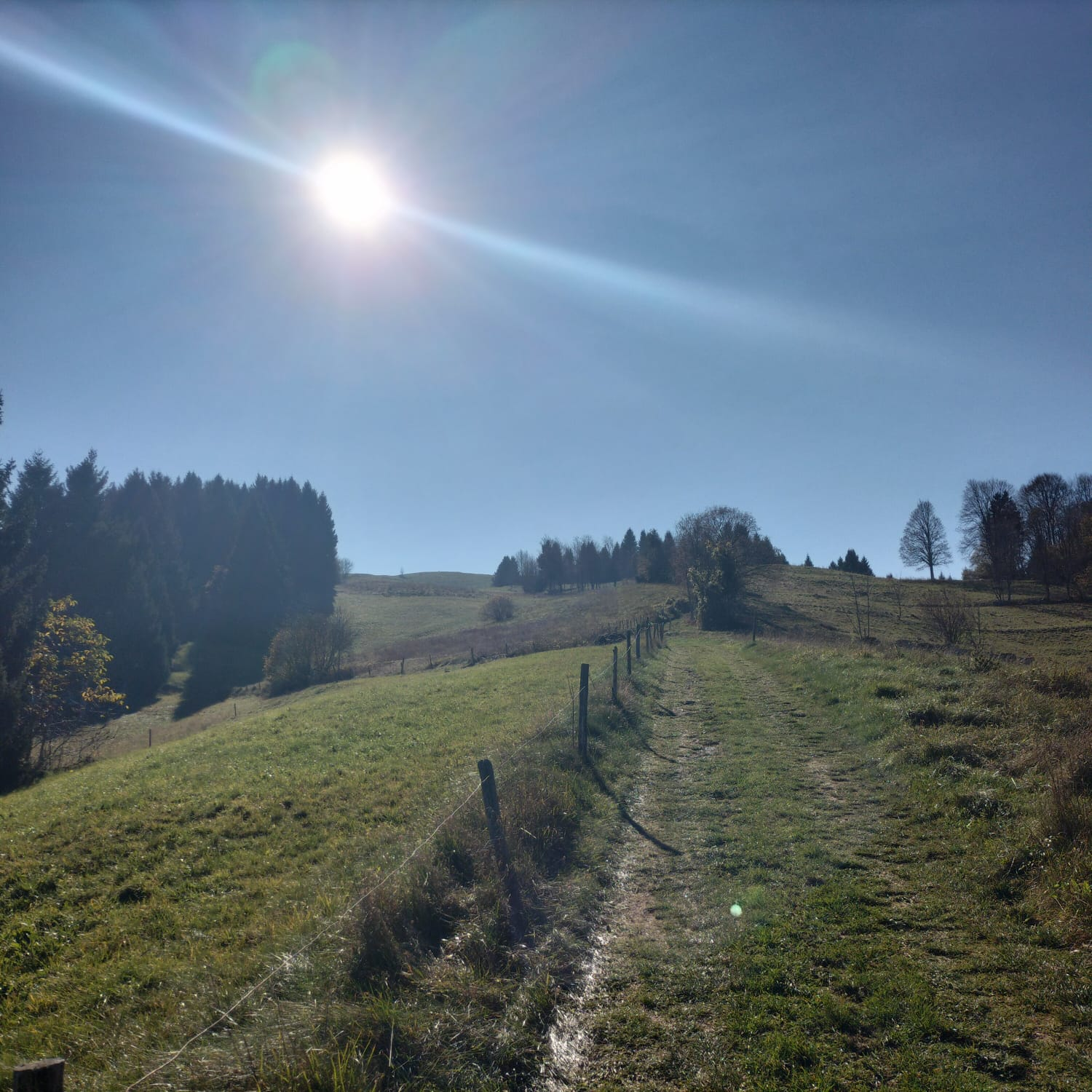
Walking trail on Monte Zovetto from Cesuna

The trailhead can be accessed from Cesuna, Vicenza and Asiago. It passes by two cemeteries of historical significance in Magnaboschi valley: the Italian–Austrian Cemetery, and the English Cemetery. The path leads to the summit clearing of Monte Zovetto, where it is possible to walk along the entire fortified line.

==== Monte Paù – Zovetto – Lemerle Loop ====
The trail from Campiello to Monte Paù, Monte Zovetto, and Monte Lemerle is a 22 km route combining unpaved paths, mule tracks, and forest roads, with a maximum altitude of 1414 meters. Starting at Passo Campiello, near the former train station, the path traverses alpine meadows, forests, and rugged terrain, reflecting the region's natural diversity.

=== Mountain biking ===
==== The old Asiago train line route ====
Until 1955, the Asiago Plateau was connected to the Alto Vicentino plains by a narrow-gauge railway. Today, the final section of this former railway line has been repurposed into a cycling path. The track covers a distance of 24.4 km and reaches a maximum altitude of 1170 m.

The route starts with the Scogli di Ave ("Rocks of Ave"), a grassy area with rocky formations. It continues through the forests of Mount Lemerle, passing the English Military Cemetery and Baito Boscon, before reaching the pass into Magnaboschi valley. A wooden cross marks the start of the descent along the old railway track via the Val di Maso path. The route follows a wide cycle trail, passing through Treschè Conca, Cesuna, Canove, and Asiago, and it ends at the Canove station which hosts the Historical Museum of the Great War.

== Legends ==
=== The Billar Man ===
The Billar Man is a figure from Cimbrian folklore, originating in the mountains near Cesuna. He is depicted as a wild man living in a cave, wearing animal skins and surviving by hunting and foraging. His uncivilized appearance frightens the local villagers, though he never harms anyone. During a raid, the Billar Man kidnaps a woman out of desire, and from their forced union, two children are born. Despite the circumstances, the family lives happily until hunters rescue the woman, who returns to the village with the children. When the Billar Man demands his children back, the villagers drive him away in anger. The legend reflects the cultural perception of "madness" in isolated communities, where those who defied social norms were labeled as wild or mad. In this context, the wildness of Billar Man represents a boundary between civilization and nature, echoing ancient cultural views where nature was both dangerous and fertile, capable of inspiring wisdom and fear. Ultimately, Billar Man, though initially seen as "mad," reveals himself to be more human than the villagers who deny him the love of his children.

== Cultural references ==
=== Monte Zovetto in literature ===
- Un anno sul Pasubio (A Year on Pasubio) published in 1918 by Michele Campana. The author, a lieutenant of the Brigata Liguria, recounted his experience in World War One fighting on the high-altitude front.
- One Year on the High Plateau published by Emilio Lussu in 1938. The author narrates the events and the life of the soldiers during World War I, during which he fought as an officer of the Sassari Brigade on the Asiago Plateau and on Monte Zovetto.
- History of Tönle by Mario Rigoni Stern, published for the first time in 1978: narrates the life of a contraband shepherd whose traditional rural world was upended by the events of World War I, specifically the Austro-Hungarian Strafexpedition that took place on Monte Zovetto.
- La guerra della Naia Alpina by Mario Rigoni Stern, published in 1967. It is a collection of stories that focuses on the life of the soldiers of the Italian mountain troops, during mandatory military service (known as "naia") and, in some cases, during wartime conflicts. Monte Zovetto is mentioned as one of the locations where Italian patrols passed through, with a 303 rifle falling in the area and trenches being referenced. The author also recounts photographing Monte Zovetto and Mount Lemerle.
- I diari di mio padre (My dad's diaries) by Gregorio Corigliano: the book presents the war diaries of the author's father, Antonino Corigliano, written between 1938 and 1946. After joining the military, Corigliano is sent to Libya as an officer and is stationed in Benghazi when World War II breaks out. After the war, he is captured and spends five years as a prisoner in India. During this time, he writes about his experiences as a cadet officer, his commitment to the war, and the difficult realities of imprisonment, reflecting his initial optimism, the challenges of military service, and the suffering he endured.
- I Caduti della Provincia di Savona nella Grande Guerra (1915-1918) by Antonio Martino: this book, published in 2016, collects the biographical records of the 2,326 soldiers who died in World War I from the 69 municipalities of the Province of Savona, in order to remember, one hundred years after the Great War, those who sacrificed their lives and whose memory must not be lost. Among the many names of the fallen soldiers, some of them were victims on Monte Zovetto and in the surrounding areas.
- Il bosco di Macchione (The forest of Macchione) by Luisa Bussi, published in 2021. The book follows three families navigating the dramatic events from the early 1900s to the outbreak of World War I. Amidst the transformations of the Giolittian era, they uncover enduring bonds of friendship, love, and resentment against the backdrop of rapid social change. Monte Zovetto is mentioned alongside Monte Lemerle during a critical moment in the story when Arturo, one of the characters, receives the order to defend the mountain against advancing enemy forces.
- Ordini di guerra (Settore Monte Zovetto, Val Magnaboschi, Cesuna) by Alberto Caselli Lapeschi and Mario Porto. This book contains the military orders of the First World War specifically in the area of Monte Zovetto and nearby, the orders were recorded by two soldiers who are the authors of this book, Mario Porto and captain Lapeschi.

== See also ==
- Italian front in World War I
- Italian front in World War II
- Alpini
- Sassari brigade
- Battles of the Isonzo
- Cimbri
- Asiago cheese
- Monte Cengio
- Monte Ortigara
