= Cimbric =

Cimbric may refer to:

- The Cimbri, an ancient Germanic people
- The Cimbrian language, a modern Germanic language spoken in northern Italy
