= Lusiana =

Italian comune

Lusiana Lusaan (Cimbrian)
- Frazione
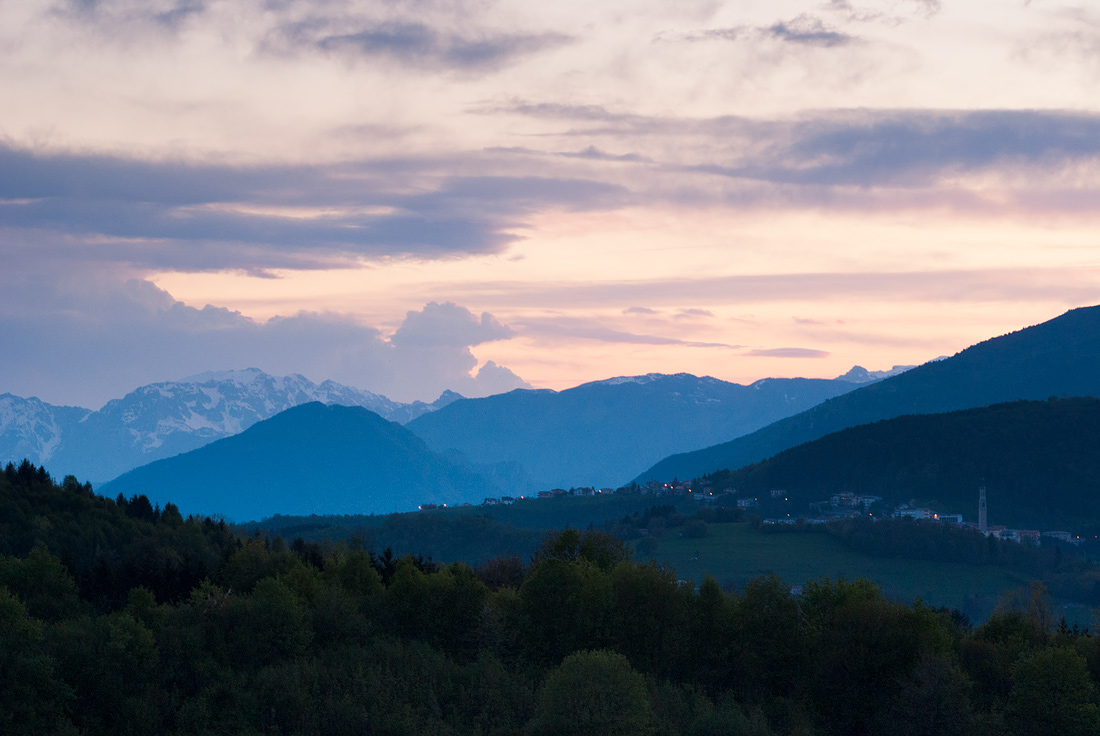
- View of Lusiana

- Location of Lusiana in Italy
- Coordinates: 45°47′N 11°34′E
- Country: Italy
- Region: Veneto
- Province: Vicenza (VI)
- Comune: Lusiana Conco

Area
  - Total: 34 km^{2} (13 sq mi)
- Elevation: 752 m (2,467 ft)

Population (28 February 2017)
  - Total: 2,615
  - Density: 77/km^{2} (200/sq mi)
- Demonym: Lusianesi
- Time zone: UTC+1 (CET)
  - Summer (DST): UTC+2 (CEST)
- Postal code: 36046
- Dialing code: 0424
- Patron saint: San Giacomo il Maggiore
- Saint day: 25 July
- Website: Official website

Lusiana (Cimbrian: Lusaan) is a small town in the province of Vicenza, Veneto, Italy, administratively a frazione (borough) in the comune (municipality) of Lusiana Conco, which resulted from its merger with Conco in 2019. The town is situated at about 750 metres (2,460 ft) above sea level on the Asiago plateau.

== Notable people ==
The small town is the birthplace of Sonia Maino Gandhi, widow of Rajiv Gandhi, the former prime minister of India. She was born in a neighborhood called Maini where families with the family name Maino had been living for many generations.
