= Lusiana Conco =

- Comune
- Comune di Lusiana Conco
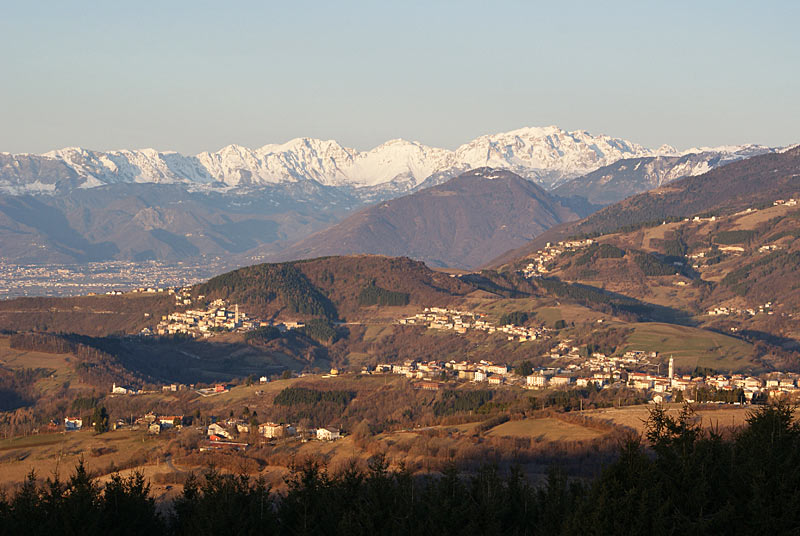
- View of Lusiana Conco

- Location within Veneto Location within Italy
- Coordinates: 45°48′3″N 11°36′29″E
- Country: Italy
- Region: Veneto
- Province: Vicenza (TV)
- Frazioni: Lusiana: Campana, Laverda, Santa Caterina, Valle di Sotto, Velo, Vitarolo; Conco: Fontanelle, Gomarolo, Rubbio, Tortima

Area
  - Total: 61.19 km^{2} (23.63 sq mi)
- Elevation: 830 m (2,720 ft)

Population (31 December 2017)
  - Total: 4,709
  - Density: 76.96/km^{2} (199.3/sq mi)
- Time zone: UTC+1 (CET)
  - Summer (DST): UTC+2 (CEST)
- Postal code: 36046
- Dialing code: 0424
- ISTAT code: 024127

Lusiana Conco is a comune (municipality) in the province of Vicenza, in the Veneto region of Italy. It was formed on 20 February 2019 with the merger of the comuni of Lusiana and Conco. Lusiana Conco is located in the Sette Comuni territory.
