= Conco =

Conco Kunken (Cimbrian)
- Frazione
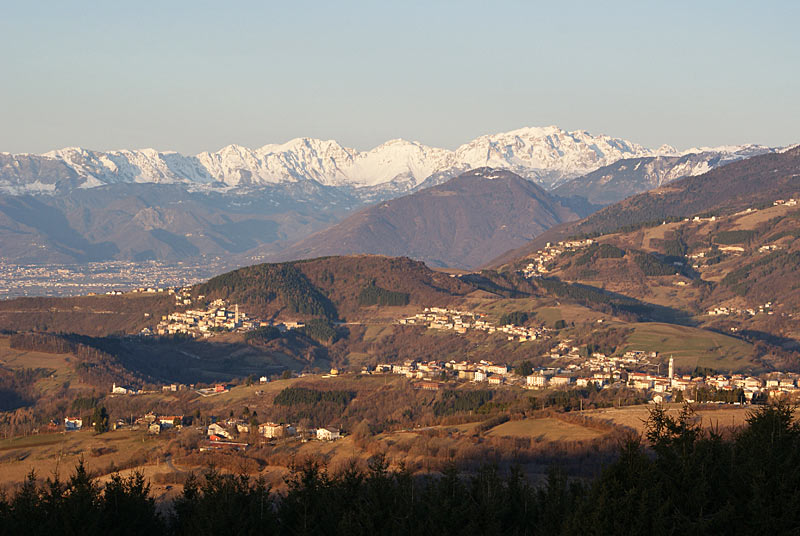
- View of Conco

- Location of Conco in Italy
- Coordinates: 45°48′N 11°37′E
- Country: Italy
- Region: Veneto
- Province: Vicenza (VI)
- Comune: Lusiana Conco

Area
  - Total: 27 km^{2} (10 sq mi)
- Elevation: 830 m (2,720 ft)

Population (31 December 2004)
  - Total: 2,200
  - Density: 81/km^{2} (210/sq mi)
- Demonym: Conchesi
- Time zone: UTC+1 (CET)
  - Summer (DST): UTC+2 (CEST)
- Postal code: 36062
- Dialing code: 0424
- Patron saint: San Marco and Madonna della Neve
- Saint day: 25 April and 5 August
- Website: Official website

Conco (Cimbrian: Kunken) is a town in the province of Vicenza, Veneto, Italy, administratively a frazione (borough) in the comune (municipality) of Lusiana Conco, which resulted from its merger with Lusiana in 2019. As of 2007, Conco had an estimated population of 2,272.

== Sources ==
- (Google Maps)
