= Sette Comuni =

Seven comuni that formed a Cimbrian enclave in the Veneto region of north-east Italy

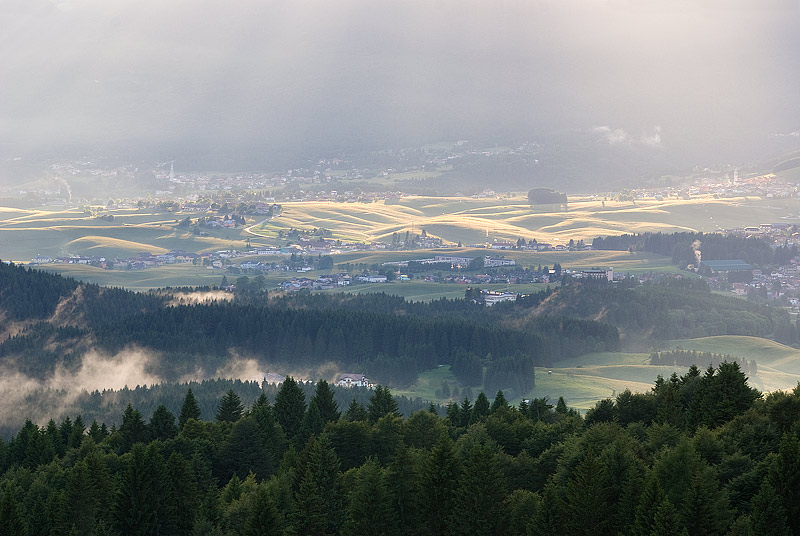
Aeral view

Flag of the Sette Comuni

The Sette Comuni (Cimbrian: Siben Komoin, German: Sieben Gemeinden) are seven comuni that formed a Cimbrian enclave in the Veneto region of north-east Italy. The area is also known as the Altopiano dei Sette Comuni or Asiago Plateau, and it was the site of a major battle between Austrian and Italian forces on the Alpine Front of World War I. The most important comune is that of Asiago, for which Asiago cheese is named. Cimbrian, a variety of Upper German, was the native language, and the area was ethnically and culturally distinct from the surrounding comuni. The Sette Comuni are located in mountainous territory, ranging from 500 to 2300 metres above sea level.

== Comuni ==
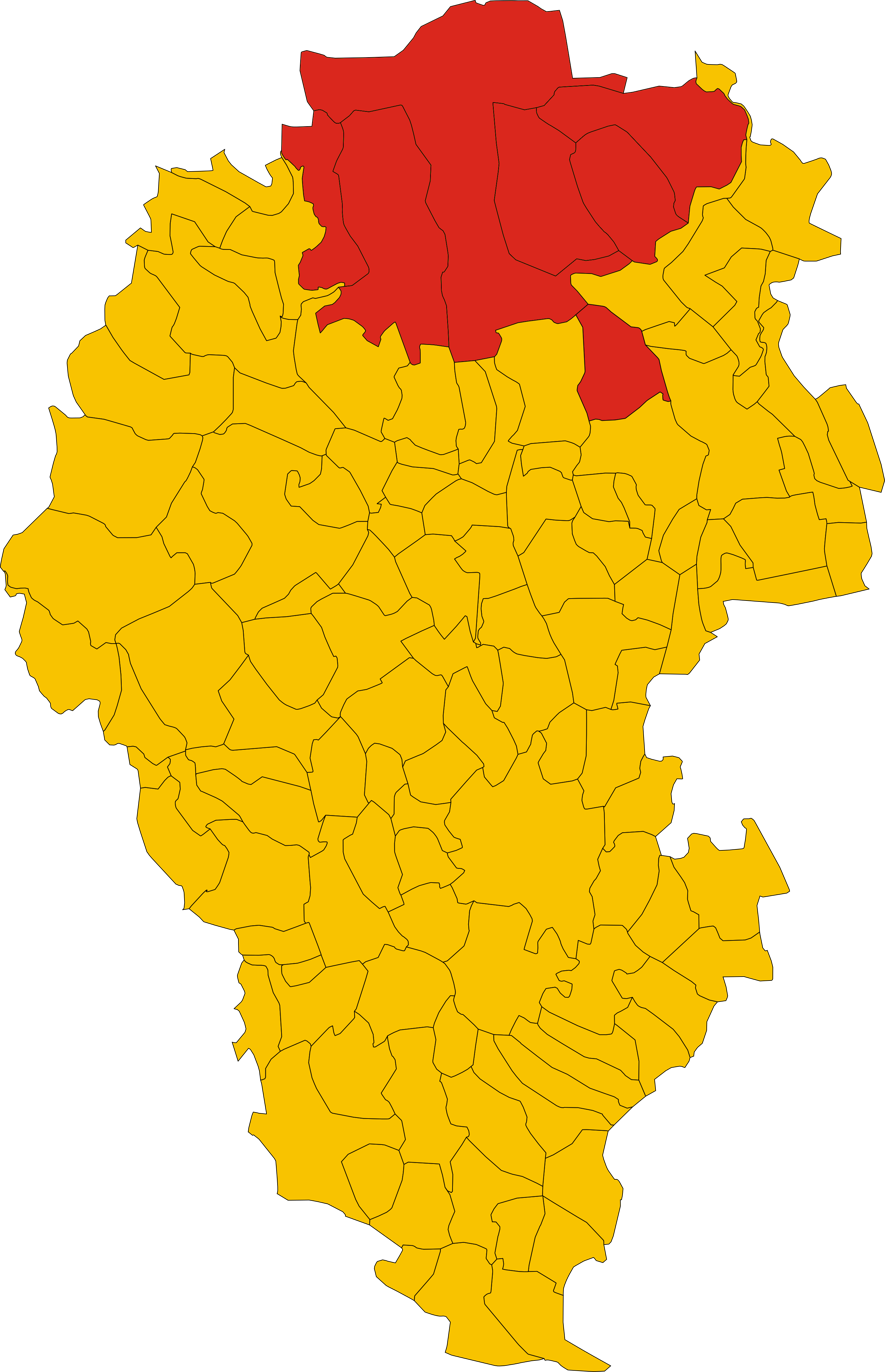
Location of the Sette Comuni in the Province of Vicenza.

Comune	Cimbrian	German	Inhabitants	Altitude (m)	Notes
Asiago	Sléghe/Schlège	Schlägen	6533	1001	
Enego	Ghenébe/Jenève	Jeneve	1927	800	
Foza	Vüsche/Vütsche	Fütze	731	1083	
Gallio	Gell(e)/Ghèl	Gelle	2331	1093	
Lusiana	Lusaan	Lusian	2833	752	
Roana	Robàan	Rovan or Rain	4245	994	
Rotzo	Rotz	Ross	620	938	
Conco	Kunken		2252	830	the "eighth comune", a frazione of Lusiana until 1796

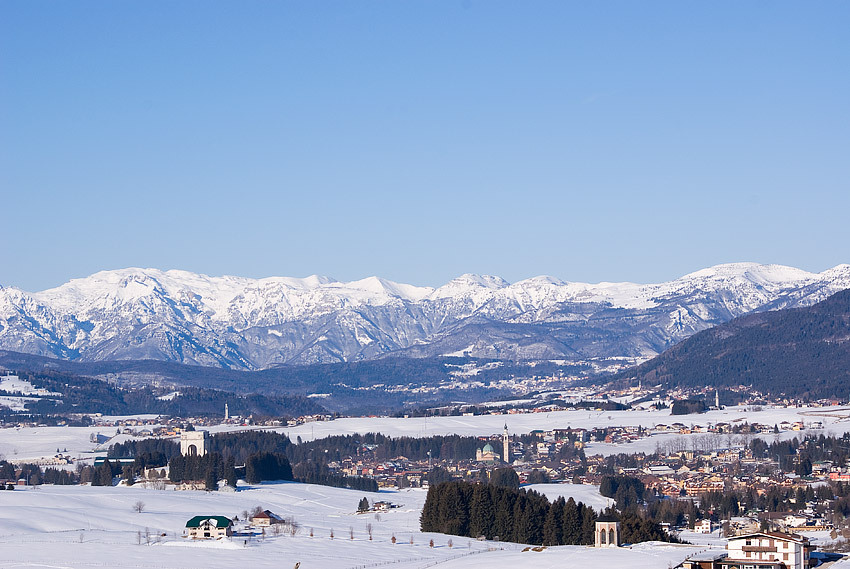
Altopiano of the Sette Comuni

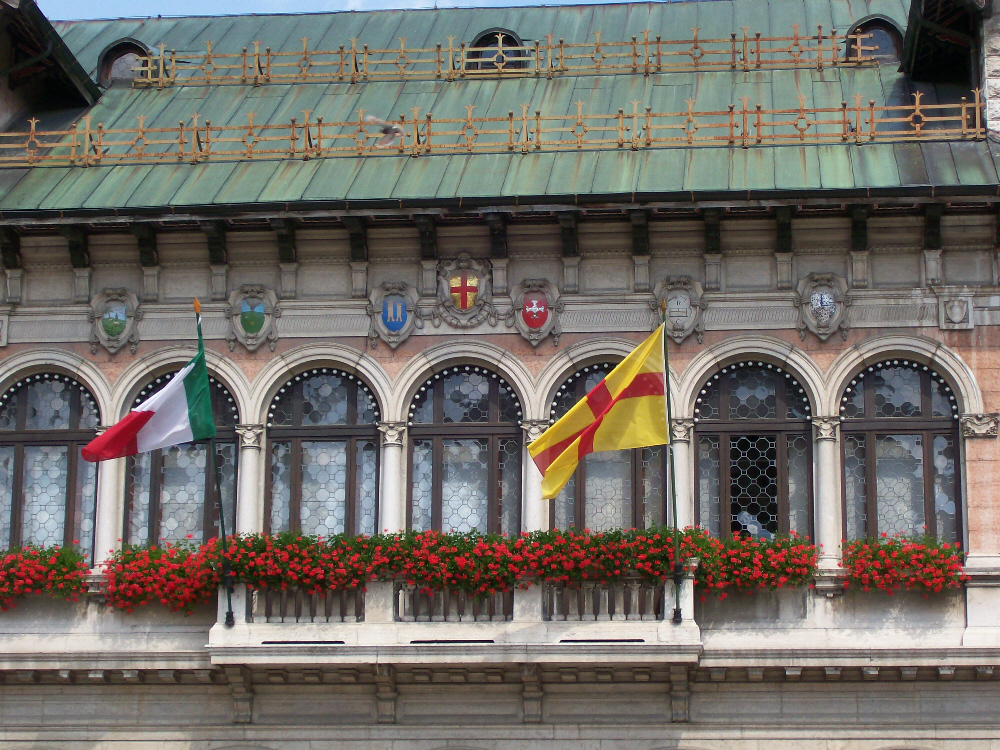
Coats of arms of the Sette Comuni on the municipal hall of Sleghe.

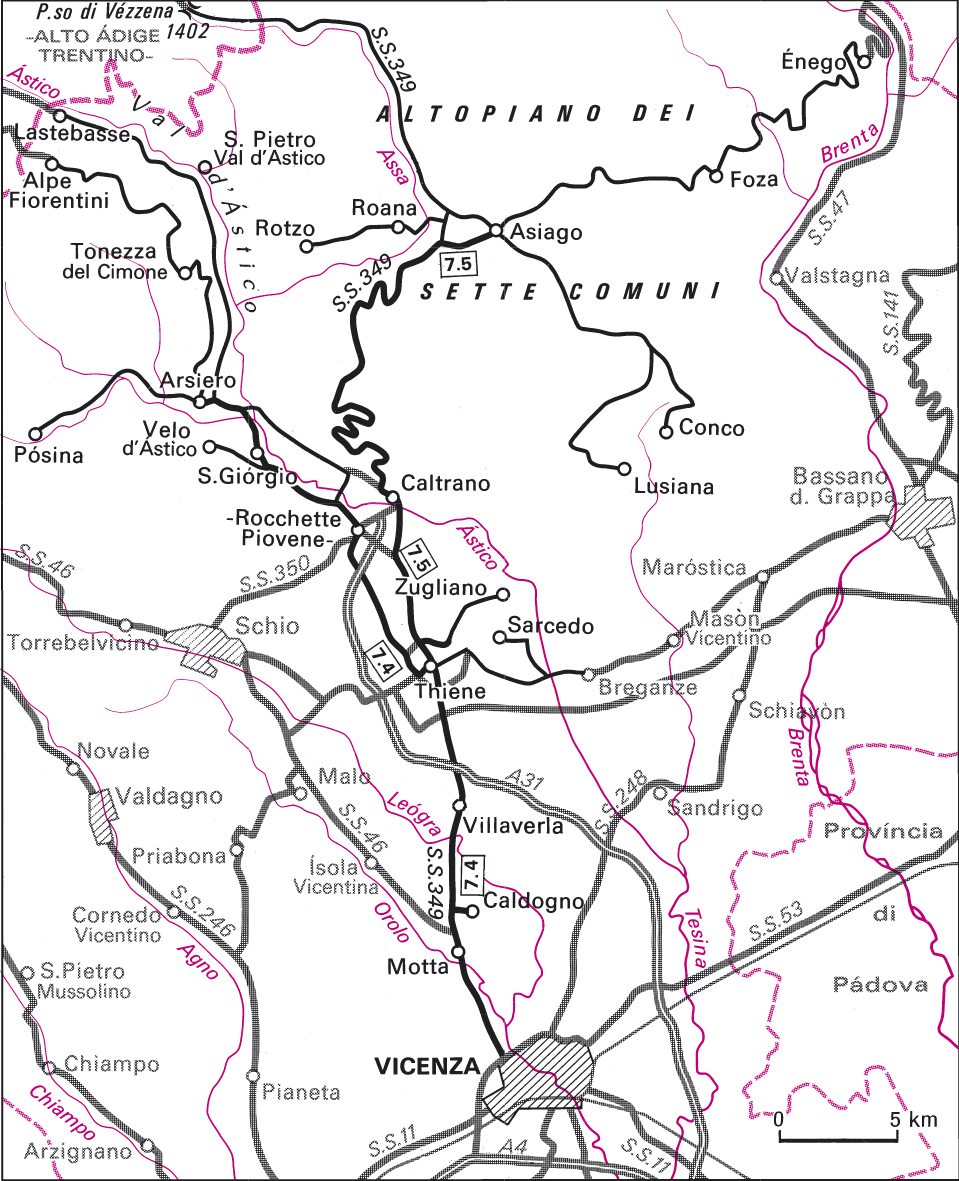
Map of Sette Comuni and Val d'Astico

== History ==
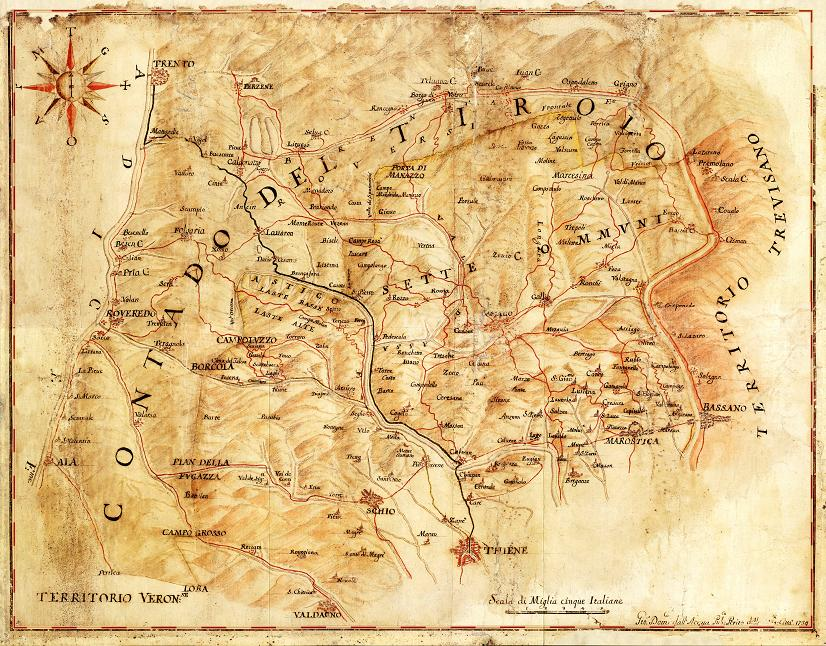
The plateau of the Sette comuni in a map of Giandomenico Dall'acqua of the Territory of Vicenza, 17th century

The seven comuni formed into a loose commonwealth in 1310. They were historically under the suzerainty of the Milanese House of Visconti and then under the Republic of Venice. Under both they enjoyed wide cultural and political autonomy in exchange for their loyalty. This autonomous status came to an end with the Napoleonic Wars and the demise of the Serenìsima in 1807.

=== World War I ===
During the First World War the territory was located along the border between the Kingdom of Italy and the Austro-Hungarian Empire. Many battles took place here between 1915 and 1918 (the most important one was the battle of Asiago). Almost all the towns were completely destroyed by the war.

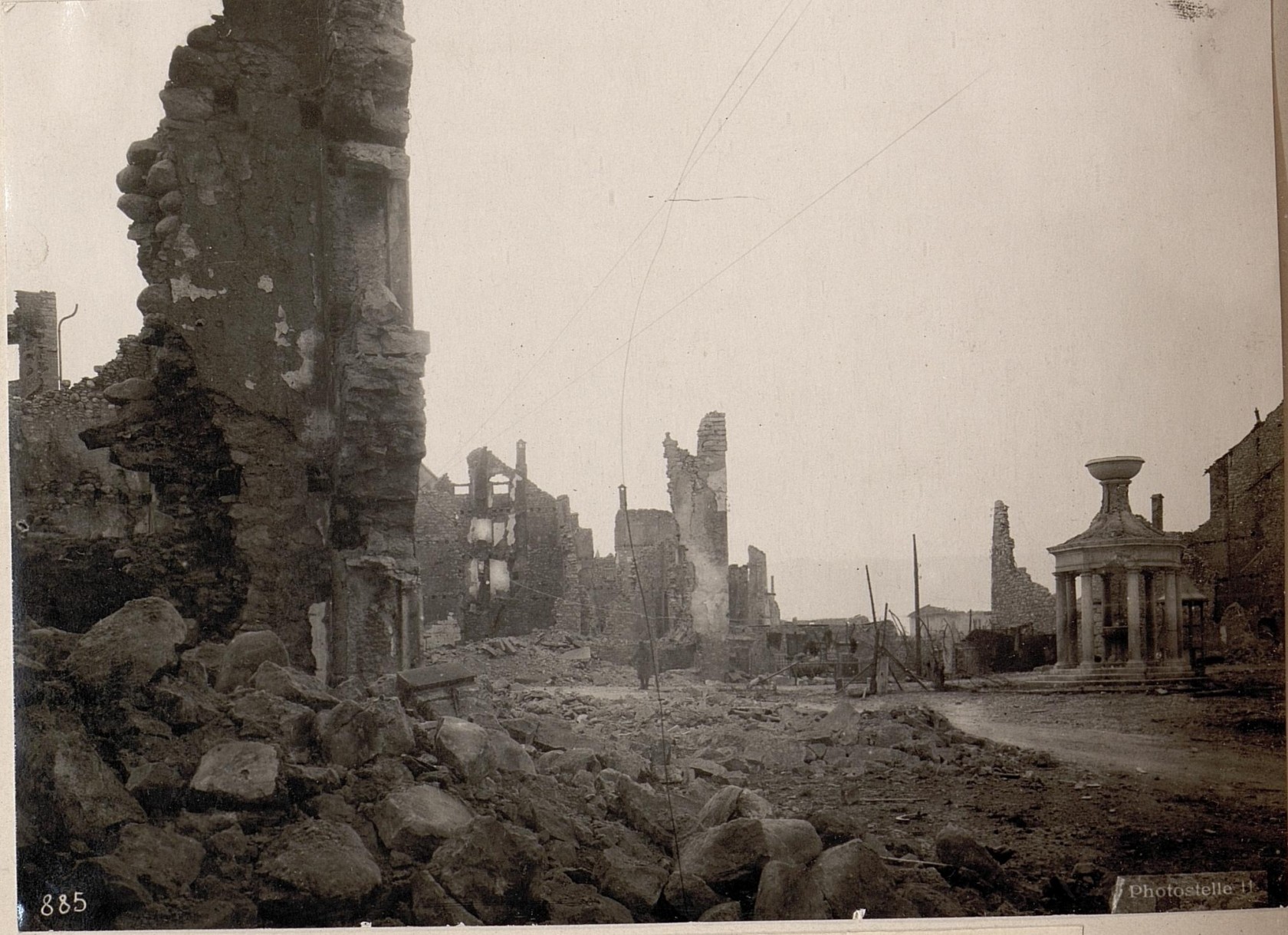
Asiago destroyed during World War I

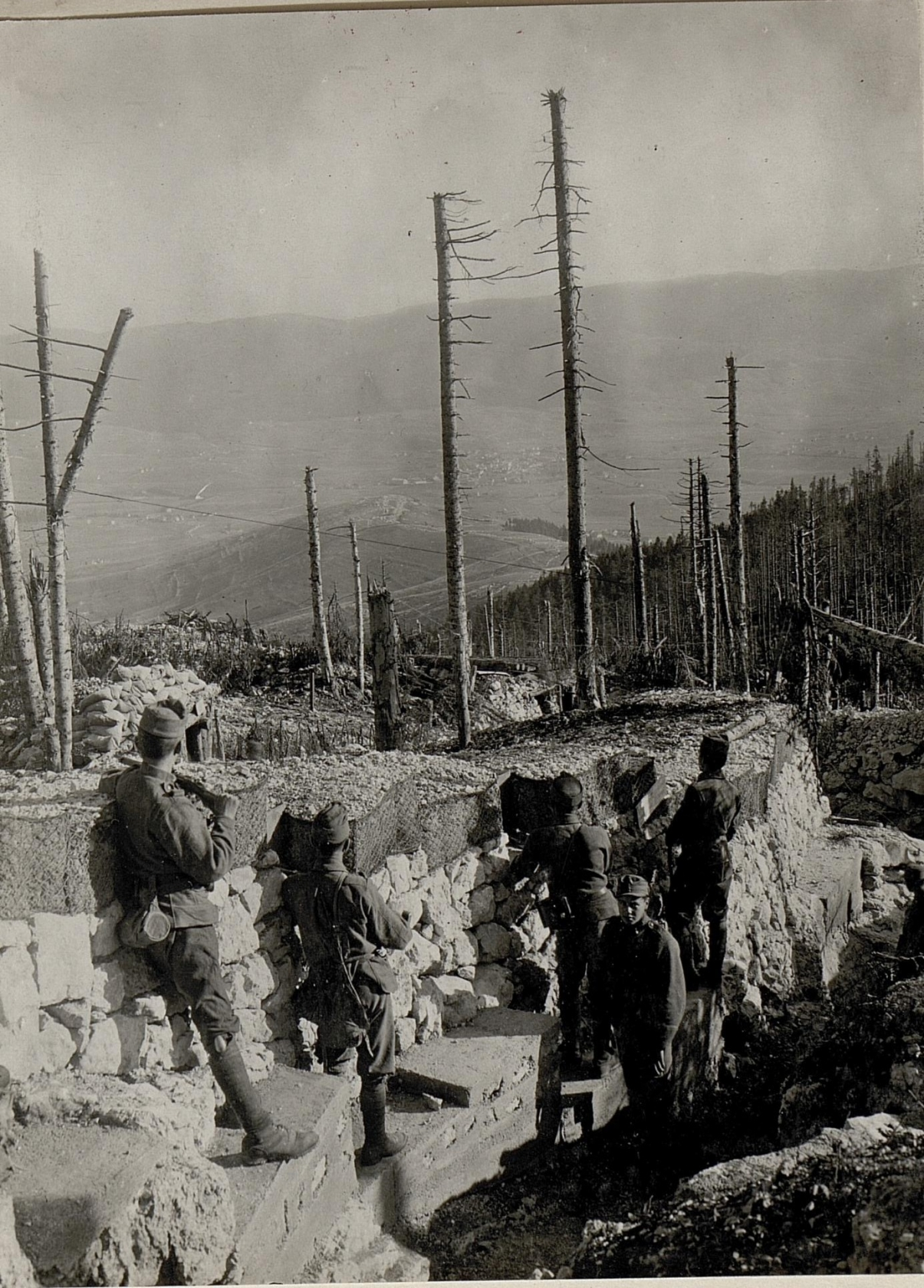
Austro-Hungarian soldiers in the woods of the Sette Comuni (Mount Zebio)

== Cimbrian ==
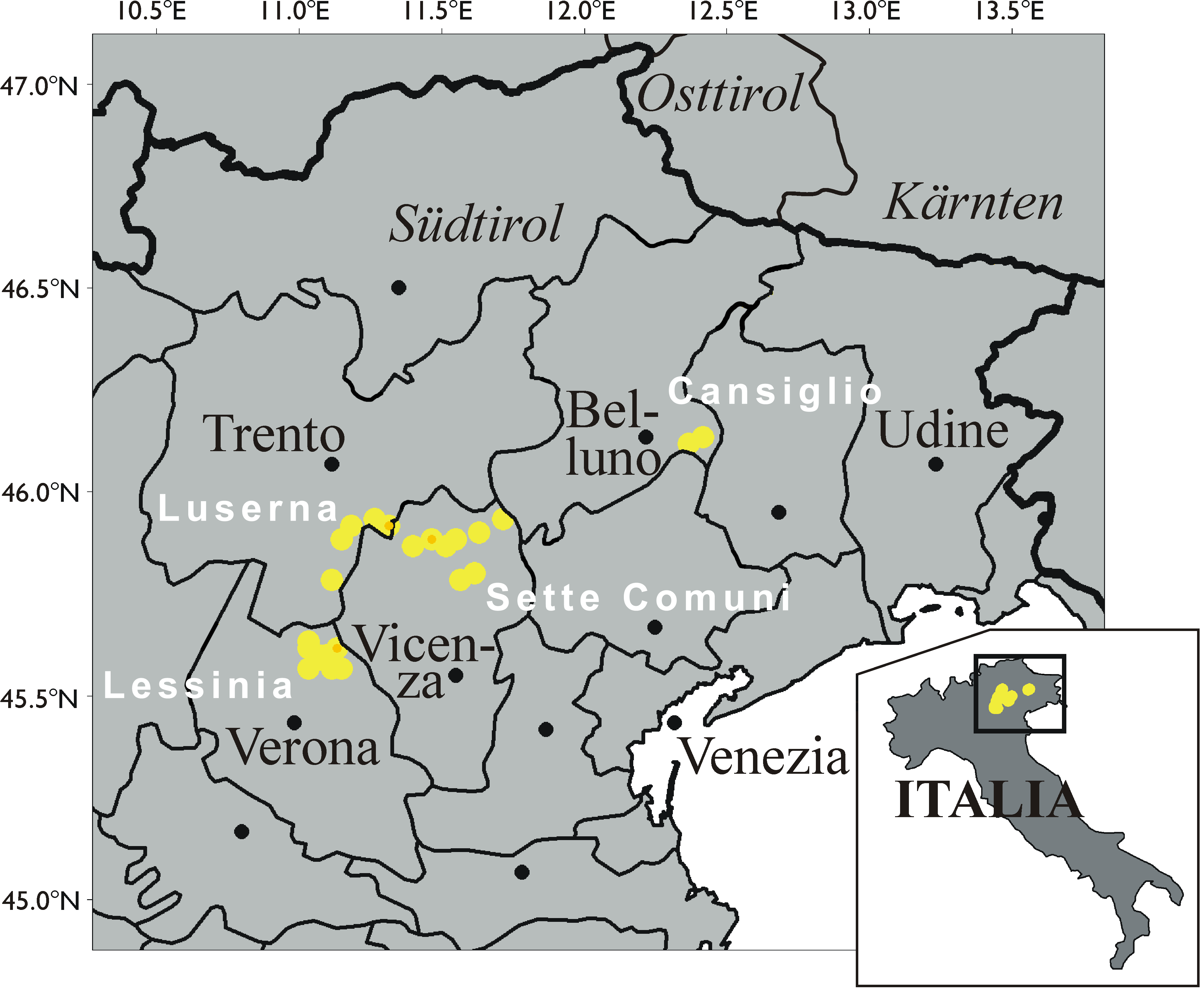
Map of north-east Italy showing where Cimbrian is spoken

Cimbrian has gone extinct in most of the comuni. Only in Robàan and its district of Mittebald/Toballe (Mittewald, Mezzaselva) has Cimbrian survived.

Robàan is home to the Agustin Prunner Cultural Institute, which is a repository of the Cimbrian culture and cooperates with other linguistic enclaves in Lusern, Fersental, Sappada, Sauris, the Thirteen Communities and Timau. Vestiges of the language are found in family and place names, which are mostly still Cimbrian.

== See also ==
- Calà del Sasso
