= Rotzo =

- Comune
- Comune di Rotzo
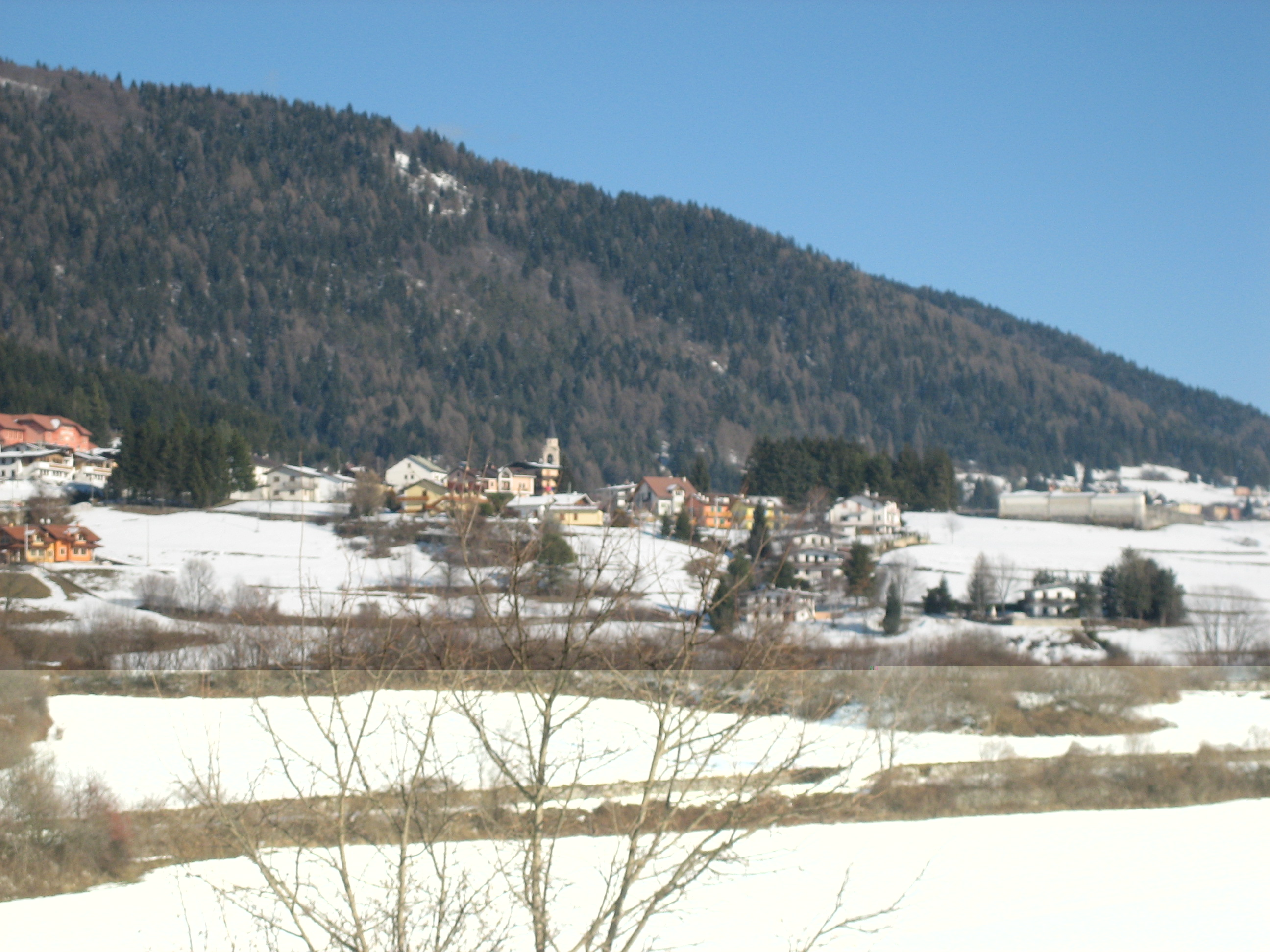
- View of Rotzo

- Location within Italy Location within Veneto
- Coordinates: 45°52′N 11°24′E
- Country: Italy
- Region: Veneto
- Province: Vicenza (VI)
- Frazioni: Albaredo, Castelletto

Government
  - Mayor: Lucio Spagnolo (local group "Insieme per Rotzo")

Area
  - Total: 28.25 km^{2} (10.91 sq mi)
- Elevation: 938 m (3,077 ft)

Population (31 December 2015)
  - Total: 666
  - Density: 23.6/km^{2} (61.1/sq mi)
- Demonym: Rotzesi
- Time zone: UTC+1 (CET)
  - Summer (DST): UTC+2 (CEST)
- Postal code: 36010
- Dialing code: 0424
- Patron saint: Saint Gertrude
- Website: Official website

Rotzo (Cimbrian: Rotz) is a town in the province of Vicenza, Veneto, northern-eastern Italy. It is east of SP350 road, and is part of the Sette Comuni plateau.
