= Foza =

- Comune
- Comune di Foza
- Coat of arms

- Location within Italy Location within Veneto
- Coordinates: 45°54′N 11°38′E
- Country: Italy
- Region: Veneto
- Province: Vicenza (VI)
- Frazioni: Valcapra, Valpiana, Lazzaretti, Tessar, Furlani, Gavelle, Guzzi, Catagni, Stainer, Trolli, Ribenach, Tottari, Ori-Chiomenti, Chigner, Carpanedi, Mengar, Badaile, Biasia, Stona di Sotto e Stona di Sopra, Piangrande

Government
  - Mayor: Mario Oro

Area
  - Total: 35.21 km^{2} (13.59 sq mi)
- Elevation: 1,083 m (3,553 ft)

Population (31 August 2017)
  - Total: 698
  - Density: 19.8/km^{2} (51.3/sq mi)
- Demonym: Fozati
- Time zone: UTC+1 (CET)
  - Summer (DST): UTC+2 (CEST)
- Postal code: 36010
- Dialing code: 0424
- Website: Official website

Foza (Cimbrian: Vüsche) is a town in the province of Vicenza, Veneto, north-eastern Italy. It is west of SS47 state road.

== Twin towns ==
- Neufahrn in Niederbayern, Germany
- Sinnai, Italy

== Sources ==
- (Google Maps)
