= Cimbrian language =

Endangered Germanic language of Italy

Cimbrian
- zimbar, tzimbar, tzimbris
- Native to: Italy
- Native speakers: 1,111 (2021)
- Language family: Indo-European: Germanic; West Germanic; Elbe Germanic; Upper German; Bavarian; Southern; Cimbrian

Official status
- Recognised minority language in: Italy: Trentino

Language codes
- ISO 639-3: cim
- Glottolog: cimb1238
- ELP: Cimbrian

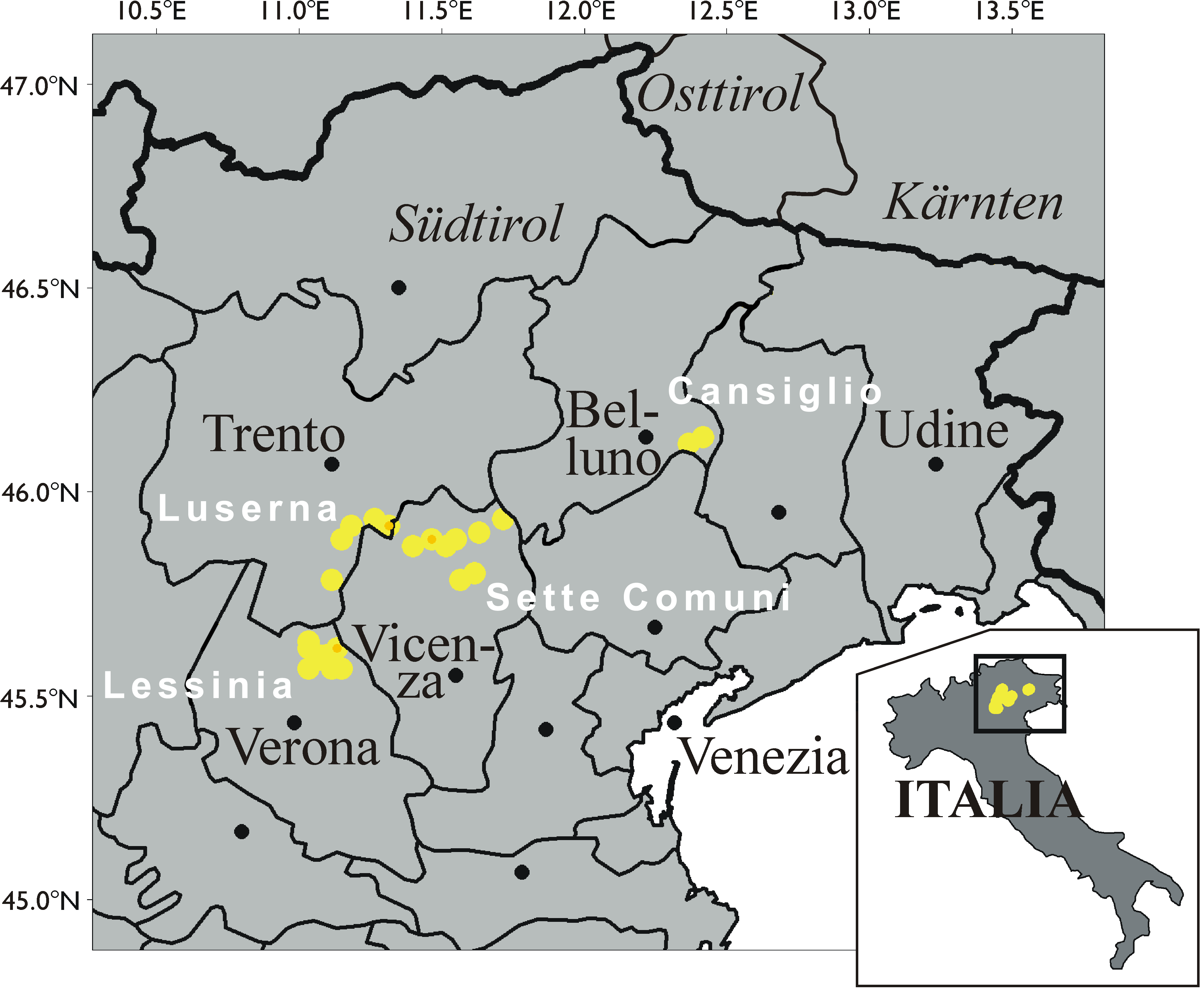
Historical (yellow) and current (orange) distribution of the Cimbrian dialects

Cimbrian (Cimbrian: zimbar, [ˈt͡simbɐr]; German: Zimbrisch; Italian: cimbro) is any of several local Upper German varieties spoken in parts of the Italian regions of Trentino and Veneto. The speakers of the language are known as Zimbern in German.

Cimbrian is a Germanic language related to Bavarian most probably deriving from a Southern Bavarian dialect. It is also related to the Mòcheno language. Its many essential differences in grammar, as well as in vocabulary and pronunciation, make it practically unintelligible for people speaking Standard German, being problematic even for many people speaking Bavarian. The use of Italian throughout the country and the influence of nearby Venetian have both had large effects on the number of speakers of Cimbrian throughout past centuries. This effect has been large enough to cause Cimbrian to be deemed an endangered language.

== History ==
The majority of the scientific community views the modern-day Cimbrians as directly descended from populations of southern Bavarian origin that migrated from the Ammersee and Lake Starnberg to a vast territory of the Eastern Italian Alps starting from 1053 AD (Bayerische Staatsbibliothek Cod. lat. 4547) to 1216 AD.

A theory of Lombardic origin of the Zimbern was proposed in 1948 by Bruno Schweizer and again in 1974 by Alfonso Bellotto. The debate was again revived in 2004 by Cimbrian linguist Ermenegildo Bidese. The majority of linguists remain committed to the hypothesis of medieval (11th to 12th century) immigration.

The presence of Germanic-speaking communities in Italy was discovered in the 14th century by the Italian humanists, who associated them with the Cimbri who arrived in the region in the 2nd century BC. This is the likely origin of the current endonym (Zimbar). In reality, although the ancient Cimbri are considered to have been a Germanic tribe, there is no reason to connect the speakers of Cimbrian specifically with them, linguistically or otherwise. In fact, a genetic study has shown significant differences between the Italian Cimbrians and the populations of the Danish region of Himmerland.

An alternative hypothesis derives the name from a term for 'carpenter', cognate with English timber (lit. 'timberer').

== Dialects and status ==
The three major dialects of Cimbrian are spoken in:

- The Seven Communities (Siben Komoin), currently only the village of Roana (Robàan)
- Luserna (Lusern), in Trentino
- The Thirteen Communities (Dreizehn Komoin), currently only the village of Giazza (Ljetzan)
- Some villages in the Carnic Alps such as Sappada, Sauris and Timau

Cimbrian is in danger of extinction both from standard Italian, which is often used in public, and the neighboring regional Venetian language. It is estimated that about 2,220 people speak Cimbrian.

In Trentino, according to the census of 2001, the first in which data on native languages were recorded, Cimbrian was spoken by a majority in the municipality of Lusérn (267 people, 89.9%). In other municipalities of Trentino 615 persons declared themselves members of the Cimbrian linguistic group, a total of 882 in Trentino. With this, it is seen that the most thriving variety of Cimbrian is that of Lusern with most of the community able to speak Cimbrian, whereas in Giazza and Roana only a few elderly speakers remain.

Cimbrian is officially recognised in Trentino by provincial and national law. Beginning in the 1990s, various laws and regulations have been passed by the Italian parliament and provincial assembly that put the Cimbrian language and culture under protection. School curricula were adapted in order to teach in Cimbrian, and bilingual street signs are being developed. A cultural institute (Istituto Cimbro/Kulturinstitut Lusérn) was founded by decree in 1987, whose purpose is to "...safeguard, promote and exploit the ethnographic and cultural heritage of the German speaking minority of the municipality of Luserna while paying special attention to historic and linguistic expressions, to the protection of the environment, and to the economic-cultural development of the Cimbrian community territory." The cultural institute hosts literature competitions for children as well as immersion summer camps.

== Phonology ==
Vowel inventory
	Front	Central	Back
	unrounded/rounded	unrounded/rounded	unrounded/rounded
Close	i / y	ɨ / ʉ	/ u
Close-mid	e / ø	ə / ɵ	/ o
Open-mid	ɛ / œ		/ ɔ
Near-open		ɐ /	
Open	a /		ɑ /

Consonant inventory
	Bilabial		Labio- dental		Dental/ Alveolar		Alveolo- palatal		Post- alveolar		Palatal		Velar		Uvular	Glottal
Nasal	m					n						ɲː*		ŋ		
Stop	p	b			t	d							k	ɡ		
Affricate			p͡f	b͡v	t͡s	d͡z			t͡ʃ	d͡ʒ	c͡ç		k͡x			
Fricative	β		f	v	s̪		s	z	ʃː				x		ʁ	h
Trill						r									ʀ	
Approximant												j		w		
Lateral						l						ʎː*				

* A star represents sounds that are used by those who speak the Lusern dialect outside of Lusern in strictly Italian areas.

== Grammar and orthography ==
The following description of Cimbrian grammar refers predominantly to the dialect of Lusern.

Notes on orthography:

- All dialects of Cimbrian use different orthographies though all are mainly based upon Italian and German orthographies with some additions from other languages and do not drastically differ.
- Diacritics and graphemes common in German and other languages are mostly utilized for sounds that do not exist in Italian.
- Diphthongs are written as in Italian whereby, for example, drai 'three' is written in contrast to the German Drei but is pronounced the same.
- [k] is rendered as in standard German as k while the grapheme ch is reserved for the sound [χ].
- [g] is rendered differently according to dialect:
  - In the Thirteen and Seven communities, [g] is rendered as in Italian - g (which is pronounced dʒ before ⟨e⟩ and ⟨i⟩). If [g] is to be kept before an (orthographic) front vowel, the writing must change to gh.
  - In Lusern, [g] is rendered mostly as g, perhaps due to more familiarity with German in Lusern. Though, seeing ghe and ghi is not uncommon.

Spelling		Major value (IPA)	Examples of major value	Minor values (IPA)	Examples of minor value	Exceptions
b	usually	/b/	bintar, bazzar, sbéstar, zbeen, plaabe, vèrban, gèban, halba, èrbot, bolaiban, brief, brìttala			
b	sometimes	/β/, /w/	bintar, bazzar, sbéstar, zbeen, plaabe, vèrban, gèban, halba, èrbot, bolaiban, brief, brìttala			
c						
ch	usually	/x/	ich, hòach, süuchan			
ch	after a short vowel	/xː/	machan, prichet			
d	elsewhere	/d/				
f		/f/	fanna, fèffar, fòat, slaafan, tief, huff, bolf, hoff, tropfa, schöpf			
ff		/fː/	fèffar, trèffan			
g	before e, i, y					
g	initially/medially elsewhere					
g	finally			/ɡ/		
gg	before e, i, y					
gg	elsewhere					
gn		/ɲ/				
h		Ø				
j				/dʒ/		
k		/k/				
kh		/kx/	khèmman, khes, khlea			
l, ll		/l/				
m, mm		/m/				
n, nn		/n/				
ng (in loanwords)		/ŋ/				
p, pp	elsewhere	/p/				
p, pp	finally	Ø		/p/		
ph		/f/				
q (see qu)		/k/				
r, rr		/ʁ/				
s	initially medially next to a consonant or after a nasal vowel	/s/		/z/		
s	elsewhere between two vowels	/z/		/s/		
s	finally			/s/		
sc	before e, i, y					
sc	elsewhere					
sch		/ʃ/		/sk/		
ss		/s/				
-st		/st/		Ø		
t, tt	elsewhere	/t/		/s/		
t, tt	finally			/t/		
tch		/t͡ʃ/				
v		/v/				
w		/w/		/v/		
x	initially next to a voiceless consonant phonologically finally	/ks/		/ɡz/		
x	medially elsewhere	/ɡz/		/s/ /z/ /ks/		
x	finally			/ks/		
z	elsewhere	/z/				
z	finally	Ø				

=== Morphology and syntax ===
Nouns in Cimbrian, as in German and other German dialects, have three genders - masculine, feminine and neuter. Cimbrian makes use of the nominative, dative, and accusative cases. The genitive case was formerly used but has now been replaced by the dative + vo ('of'), a similar case which can also be seen in modern German. Cimbrian nouns inflect for gender, case, and number, usually keeping the same patterns for even Italian loanwords ending in -a, - o, and -e. Nouns also have forms for diminutives. Cimbrian articles (both definite and indefinite) have long and short forms depending on stress. Examples of Cimbrian noun inflection (with long articles and German counterparts) can be seen below. The letter å denotes open back unrounded vowel.

Cimbrian and German noun inflection
		Gender and number					
		Masculine		Feminine		Neuter	
		Singular	Plural	Singular	Plural	Singular	Plural
Case	Nominative	dar månn (der Mann)	di månnen (die Männer)	di vedar (die Feder)	di vedarn (die Federn)	das khin (das Kind)	di khindar (die Kinder)
Case	Accusative	in månn (den Mann)	di månnen (die Männer)	di vedar (die Feder)	di vedarn (die Federn)	das khin (das Kind)	di khindar (die Kinder)
Case	Genitive	vo in månn (des Mannes)	vo in månnen (der Männer)	vo dar vedar der Feder	vo in vedarn der Federn	vo in khin (des Kinds)	vo in khindarn (der Kinder)
Case	Dative	in månn (dem Mann[e])	in månnen (den Männern)	dar vedar der Feder	in vedarn den Federn	in khin (dem Kind[e])	in khindarn (den Kindern)

Cimbrian verbs are inflected for person, number, tense (present, past, future), mood (indicative, subjunctive, conditional, imperative, infinitive, gerund, and participial), and voice (active, passive). In regards to conjugation, Cimbrian shares many aspects with many other upper-German dialects. As in these other dialects, the use of the preterite has been replaced by the perfect which is formed with the prefix ga- (vallen 'to fall'; gavallet 'fallen'). Infinitive verbs have two forms, a simple infinitive as well as a dependent infinitive which is formed with zo. An example of this can be seen with the verb 'to fall': vallen - zo valla. In the Cimbrian of Lusern's present indicative, first-person plural as well as third-person plural are both formed in the same manner as the simple infinitive, just as in standard German. Thus vallen acts as the infinitive, first-person plural, and third-person plural. The first- and third-person plural also match each other in other tenses and moods.

The syntax of Cimbrian shows measurable influence from Italian; however, it still shows German traits which would be completely foreign to Italian speakers. An example of Italian influence is seen in the fact that Cimbrian does not move its verb to the second position as in German:

- My friend* believes that he can win. (En)
- Moi txell gloabet ke dar mage vinzarn. (Cimbrian)
- Il mio amico crede che può vincere. (Italian)
- Mein Freund* glaubt, dass er gewinnen kann. (Mein Freund can also mean 'My boyfriend') (German)
- My brother went on vacation in order to relax. (English)
- Moi pruadar is gånt in vakånza zoa zo rasta. (Cimbrian)
- Mio fratello è andato in vacanza per rilassarsi. (Italian)
- Mein Bruder ist in Urlaub gefahren um sich zu erholen. (German)

Cimbrian, in most sentences, uses subject–verb–object (SVO) word ordering, similar to Romance languages; however, in some cases it adopts some German syntax.

== Vocabulary ==
The vocabulary of Cimbrian is closely related to that of Bavarian, containing words that set it apart from any other German varieties. Although today many Bavarian words in Bavarian communities are used less and less due to the influence of standard German, in Cimbrian many such words have remained. Besides its original Bavarian vocabulary, Cimbrian has been affected by Italian as well as neighboring languages.

English	German	Italian	Cimbrian
To win	Gewinnen/Siegen	Vincere	Vinzern
Bride	Braut	Sposa	Spusa
Correct/Right	Richtig	Giusto	Giust
Soldier	Soldat	Soldato	Soldado
Meanwhile	Mittlerweile	Intanto	Intanto

English	German	Swabian	Bavarian	Cimbrian
Shirt	Hemd	Hemb	Pfoat	Foat
Juniper	Wacholder	Wacholder	Kranewitt	Khranebitt
Vicar	Pfarrer (also Pfaffe though nowadays this is often derogatory)	Pfarr	Pfaff	Faff
Tuesday	Dienstag	Ziestig	Erta	Erta
Thursday	Donnerstag	Donarstig	Pfinzta	Finzta

== Examples ==
English	German	Cimbrian
Christ is risen from all tortures, therefore let us rejoice Christ shall be our solace	Christ ist erstanden von der Marter alle, des solln (also: soll'n) wir alle froh sein, Christ will unser Trost sein.	Christus ist au gestanden von der marter alle, daz sunna bier alle froalich sayn Christus bil unsare troast sayn.

The Fort of Lusern (English)	Die Festung von Lusern (German)	Dar forte vo Lusern (Cimbrian)
During the war, the fort of Lusern resisted superbly. In the first few days a Czech commander wanted to give up, hoisting the white flag and withdrawing the garrison. Only one drunken soldier remained in the fort. When the Italians came storming into the fort to occupy it, the drunken soldier awoke from his intoxication and began to let the machine gun rattle.	Während des Krieges wehrte sich die Festung von Lusern vortrefflich. Die ersten Tage wollte sie ein tschechischer Kommandant aufgeben, indem er die weiße Fahne hisste und mit der Besatzung abzog. Nur ein betrunkener Soldat blieb zurück in der Festung. Als die anstürmenden Italiener in die Festung eindringen wollten, um sie in Besitz zu nehmen, erwachte der betrunkene Soldat von seinem Rausch und fing an, das Maschinengewehr knattern zu lassen.	Pan khriage dar forte vo Lusern hat se gebeart gerecht. Di earstn tage von khriage, dar kommandant a Tschechoslowako hebat in forte gebelt augem un hat ausgezoget di bais bandiara un is vongant pin soldan. A trunkhantar soldado alua is no gestant sem in forte. Bia da soin zuakhent di Balischan zo giana drin in forte, is se darbkeht dar trunkhante soldado un hat agehevt z'schiasa.
